= Jules-Aristide Bourdes-Ogouliguende =

Gabonese politician

President of the National Assembly of Gabon
- In office November 1990 – April 1993
- Preceded by: Augustin Boumah
- Succeeded by: Marcel Éloi Rahandi Chambrier

Personal details
- Born: 28 February 1938
- Died: 26 March 2018 (aged 80)
- Party: Gabonese Democratic Party

Jules-Aristide Bourdes-Ogouliguende (28 February 1938 – 26 March 2018) was a Gabonese politician who was the President of the Congress for Democracy and Justice (CDJ), an opposition party. He served as a minister in the government of Gabon from 1976 to 1990 and was President of the National Assembly from 1990 to 1993; from 1993 until his death in 2018.

== Early life, education, and legal career ==
A member of the Myene ethnic group, Bourdes-Ogouliguende was born in Libreville on 28 February 1938. He attended primary and secondary school in Libreville and Port-Gentil and then continued his studies in France. While studying in France, he was a member of the Lille section of the Federation of Students of Black French Africa from 1961 to 1962, and he headed the Lille section of the Union of Catholic African Students from 1962 to 1964. Later, he was the President of the General Association of the Students of Gabon from November 1967 to June 1968.

Back in Gabon, Bourdes-Ogouliguende began a career in law in 1968. He was Legal Adviser to the Ministry of Justice from 5 June 1972 to 15 November 1972. Subsequently, he was Vice-President of the Judicial Chamber of the Supreme Court from 15 November 1972 to 25 June 1973 and President of the Judicial Chamber of the Supreme Court from 25 June 1973 to 15 March 1976. At the January 1973 extraordinary congress of the Gabonese Democratic Party (PDG), he became a member of the party's Central Committee.

== Political career ==
Bourdes-Ogouliguende was appointed to the government as Minister of the Civil Service on 15 March 1976, and his responsibilities were expanded when he was appointed as Minister of the Civil Service and Justice on 15 February 1978. He joined the PDG Political Bureau at the party's 1979 congress. In the government, he was promoted to the position of Minister of State for Labour and Employment on 22 August 1981, and he was moved to the position of Minister of State for Higher Education, Scientific Research, the Environment and the Protection of Nature on 15 March 1983. Subsequently, his portfolio was reduced and he served as Minister of State for Higher Education and Scientific Research from 27 March 1984 until January 1990, when he was replaced in the wake of student unrest at Omar Bongo University.

He then served briefly as Minister of Agriculture, Animal Husbandry, and the Rural Economy until April 1990. Following the March–April 1990 National Conference, he was Minister of Trade, Consumption, Industry, and Relations with Parliament from April 1990 to November 1990.

In the 1990 parliamentary election, Bourdes-Ogouliguende was elected to the National Assembly as a PDG candidate in Ogooué-Maritime Province; he was then elected as President of the National Assembly on 20 November 1990. He was also elected as President of the International Assembly of French Speaking Parliamentarians at a meeting in Ottawa in September 1991. As President of the National Assembly, he followed an independent course and sometimes sided with the opposition in parliamentary votes. He resigned from the PDG on 27 January 1993, and he resigned as President of the National Assembly on 23 April 1993.

Speaking at a conference in a Libreville hotel before an audience of several hundred, Bourdes-Ogouliguende announced on 10 May 1993 that he would stand as a candidate in the December 1993 presidential election. His candidacy was backed by the JABO group (based on the initials of Bourdes-Ogouliguende's name). At the time of the election, he was part of the Convention of Forces for Change, the main opposition coalition. Immediately following the election, he said that the main opposition candidate, Paul Mba Abessole, was leading in the vote count, and he warned that if President Omar Bongo (the PDG candidate) was nevertheless credited with a first-round victory, "we will destroy, we will seriously lay waste".

Despite this threat of violence, Bongo was credited with a narrow first-round majority of 51.07%, well ahead of Mba Abessole, who placed second. Bourdes-Ogouliguende himself placed fifth with 3.38% of the vote.

The JABO group merged with other parties to form the Congress for Democracy and Justice (CDJ), an opposition party, under Bourdes-Ogouliguende's leadership. Bourdes-Ogouliguende remained a Deputy in the National Assembly until 1996. He later became President of the National Council of Democracy (CND), an official body charged with mediating disputes between political parties, in May 1998, and he became Secretary-General of the CDJ in September 2000. Pierre-Claver Zeng Ebome succeeded him as President of the CND on 8 January 2003.

As a representative of the opposition, Bourdes-Ogouliguende was included on the joint majority–opposition commission on the reform of the electoral process, which began its work in May 2006 and included 12 representatives from the Presidential Majority as well as 12 from the opposition.

In the December 2006 parliamentary election, Bourdes-Ogouliguende was elected to the National Assembly from Port-Gentil. He was the only CDJ candidate to win a seat in the election.

As of December 2007, he was Chairman of the Board of the Gabonese Refining Company (Société Gabonaise de Raffinage, SOGARA).

Speaking in the National Assembly on 2 June 2009, Bourdes-Ogouliguende criticized the installation of surveillance cameras in the major cities as well as the introduction of biometric passports on the grounds that no laws had been passed providing for either. He described the government of Prime Minister Jean Eyéghé Ndong as "dangerous". Eyéghé Ndong argued that the cameras were necessary for public safety and that the biometric passports were needed to comply with international standards, although he acknowledged the need for new laws.

=== 2009 presidential election ===
Bourdes-Ogouliguende ran as the CDJ candidate in the 30 August 2009 presidential election, which was held as a result of the death of President Bongo in June 2009. He was officially presented as the CDJ candidate on 24 July 2009.

On 27 July 2009, he and seven other candidates—Pierre Mamboundou, Paul Mba Abessole, Luc Bengono Nsi, Jean Eyéghé Ndong, André Mba Obame, Casimir Oyé Mba, and Anna Claudine Ayo Assayi—jointly called for the resignation of the candidates Ali Bongo and Pierre-Claver Maganga Moussavou from the government. Bourdes-Ogouliguende, describing the situation as unacceptable, expressed particular concern about the power Bongo wielded as Minister of Defense, worrying that he could use that power to influence the outcome of the election.

After presidential candidates met with Interim President Rose Francine Rogombé in Libreville on 12 August to discuss issues related to the electoral process, Bourdes-Ogouliguende, acting as spokesman for a group of 11 candidates, announced that they wanted the election to be delayed and would take the matter to the courts; according to Bourdes-Ogouliguende, "in the current climate, the irregularities and disparities are too flagrant."

On 25 August 2009, Eyeghé Ndong called for the opposition candidates to join together in support of a single candidate to face Bongo. The opposition candidates gathered for negotiations at a meeting chaired by Eyeghé Ndong and held a secret ballot to choose a joint candidate. The vote concluded early on 28 August and André Mba Obame was declared the victor. A statement was then sent to the press announcing that 11 candidates were withdrawing from the election and rallying behind Mba Obame's candidacy. However, several of the candidates, including Bourdes-Ogouliguende, promptly denied that, saying that they were still running and did not support Mba Obame.

According to official results, Bourdes-Ogouliguende placed ninth in the election with 0.20% of the vote.

In the December 2011 parliamentary election, the ruling PDG won an overwhelming majority of seats amidst an opposition boycott. Acting as spokesman for an opposition coalition that boycotted the vote, Bourdes-Ogouliguende said that the coalition considered the election invalid because "the parliament it will bring into office represents less than 10 percent of the population". He died in Libreville on 26 March 2018 at the age of 80.
