= Paul Biyoghé Mba =

Gabonese politician

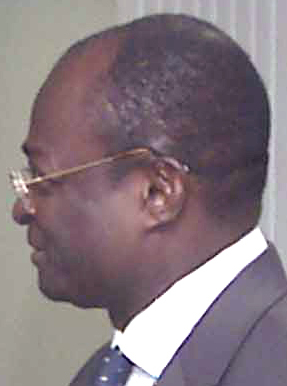
- Biyoghé Mba in 2006

7th Prime Minister of Gabon
- In office 17 July 2009 – 27 February 2012
- President: Rose Francine Rogombé (Acting); Ali Bongo Ondimba
- Preceded by: Jean Eyeghé Ndong
- Succeeded by: Raymond Ndong Sima

Personal details
- Born: 18 April 1953 (age 73) Donguila, French Equatorial Africa (now Gabon)
- Party: Gabonese Democratic Party
- Education: University of Rennes

Paul Biyoghé Mba (born 18 April 1953) is a Gabonese politician who was Prime Minister of Gabon from July 2009 to February 2012. A member of the Gabonese Democratic Party (PDG), he served for years as a minister in the government prior to his appointment as Prime Minister. From 2012 to 2015, he was President of the Economic and Social Council of Gabon, and he has again served in the government as First Deputy Prime Minister for Health since 2015.

== Background and political career ==
Biyoghé Mba was born in Donguila, located in the Komo-Mondah Department of Gabon. After studying business administration at the University of Rennes in France, he was Deputy Director of the Gabonese Development Bank, then Director of Credits at the Bank, from 1977 to 1980. Afterwards he was Adviser to the President of the Republic for Commercial, Industrial, and Investment Affairs from 1980 to 1983 and Political Adviser to the President from 1983 to 1984. He was subsequently appointed as Deputy Director of the Cabinet of the President for Economic, Financial, and Administrative Affairs in 1984. After President Omar Bongo visited the United States in August 1987 and met with representatives of various American companies, he selected Biyoghé Mba to head a program that would work with American companies to facilitate investment in Gabon. Biyoghé Mba continued to serve as Deputy Director of the Presidential Cabinet until he entered the government as Minister of Trade, Consumption, and the Transfer of Technology in 1989.

After winning a seat in the 1990 parliamentary election, Biyoghé Mba left the government and served as a Deputy in the National Assembly from 1990 to 1992. He was then appointed as Minister of State Control, Parastatal Reform and Privatization in 1992 and was treasurer of President Bongo's 1993 re-election campaign. He remained Minister of State Control, Parastatal Reform and Privatization until he resigned from the government on 27 February 1994, accusing the government of "authoritarian drift" in the wake of riots in Libreville and Port-Gentil. He also left the PDG, founding the Common Development Movement (MCD), and he returned to his seat in the National Assembly, serving there again from 1994 to 1996.

Speaking on Radio Soleil on 18 December 1996, Mba alleged that falsifications had occurred at polling stations for the second seat from Komo-Mondah Department in the December 1996 parliamentary election. In 1997 he was elected to the newly established Senate, and he was Quaestor of the Senate from 1997 to 1999. He returned to the government in January 1999, when he was appointed as Minister of Small and Medium-Sized Enterprises, Small and Medium-Sized Industries, and the Craft Industry. The MCD merged itself into the PDG in November 2002.

Mba was moved to the post of Minister of Trade, Industrial Development, and NEPAD in 2003. He remained in that position until 7 October 2008, when he was instead appointed as Minister of Agriculture, Animal Husbandry, and Rural Development.

=== Prime minister ===
Following the death of President Omar Bongo on 8 June 2009, the PDG leadership selected his son, Defense Minister Ali-Ben Bongo, as its candidate for early presidential election scheduled for 30 August 2009. Jean Eyeghe Ndong, who had unsuccessfully sought the nomination, then resigned as Prime Minister on 17 July 2009 and announced he would stand as an independent candidate. Later on the same day, interim president Rose Francine Rogombé appointed Biyoghé Mba to succeed Eyeghe Ndong as Prime Minister. He was expected to take "the necessary time to hold consultations before forming his government".

The composition of Biyoghé Mba's government was announced on the evening of 22 July. It was composed of 44 members, slightly smaller than the previous government under Eyeghe Ndong. Six ministers were dismissed, including two party leaders (Paul M'ba Abessole and Pierre-André Kombila) and three presidential candidates (M'ba Abessole, Casimir Oyé Mba, and André Mba Obame). Oyé Mba and Mba Obame were both PDG members who had chosen to run as independents after Ali-Ben Bongo was selected as the PDG candidate, while Kombila had chosen to support the opposition candidate Pierre Mamboundou.

Bongo won the election with a plurality of the vote according to official results, although the opposition alleged fraud; following a recount by the Constitutional Court, he was sworn in as President on 16 October 2009. Later in the day, he announced the reappointment of Biyoghé Mba as Prime Minister; he made the announcement personally "to underline the importance of this moment". According to Bongo, Biyoghé Mba had the necessary experience and managerial competence "to lead us through the next stage", and he said work would start "immediately". The composition of his new government was announced on 17 October; it was reduced to only 30 ministers, thereby fulfilling Bongo's campaign promise to reduce the size of the government and thereby reduce expenses. The government was also mostly composed of new faces, including many technocrats, although a few key ministers, such as Paul Toungui (Foreign Minister), Jean-François Ndongou (Interior Minister), and Laure Olga Gondjout (Communications Minister), retained their posts.

Following the December 2011 parliamentary election, Biyoghé Mba submitted his resignation in February 2012. President Bongo appointed Raymond Ndong Sima to succeed him on 27 February 2012. In late June 2012, Biyoghé Mba was appointed to a five-year term as President of the Economic and Social Council, a state institution tasked with providing advice on economic, social, and cultural matters. He was again appointed to the government as First Deputy Prime Minister for Health, Social Welfare and National Solidarity on 11 September 2015. His return to the government was viewed as a sign that Bongo wanted to appease senior figures in the PDG who were prominent under Bongo's father but had generally lost clout after Ali Bongo's succession, and it was suggested that Bongo hoped Biyoghé Mba's influence in Estuaire Province might be helpful in the 2016 presidential election.

Political offices
| Preceded by Jean Eyeghé Ndong | Prime Minister of Gabon; 2009–2012 | Succeeded by Raymond Ndong Sima |
