= Pierre-Claver Zeng Ebome =

Gabonese politician (1953–2010)

Pierre-Claver Zeng Ebome (8 September 1953 – 19 May 2010) was a Gabonese politician and musician. He held a succession of ministerial portfolios in the government of Gabon during the 1990s and subsequently served as a Deputy in the National Assembly of Gabon. Zeng Ebome was the President of the African Development Movement (MAD), a minor political party, until February 2010, when it merged itself into the National Union; afterward he was briefly a Vice-President of the National Union from February 2010 to May 2010.

== Biography ==
Zeng Ebome was born at Ekouasse in northern Gabon, and he received his primary and secondary education in Oyem. He then attended the Omar Bongo Technical School and Omar Bongo University, both located in Libreville. Later he studied in France at the National School of Treasury Services. He gained fame in Gabon as a singer beginning in the mid-1970s and was appointed as Central Inspector of the Treasury in 1985.

A member of the opposition Association for Socialism in Gabon (APSG), Zeng Ebome was appointed to the government of Gabon in 1990. In light of his musical career, he was nicknamed the "crooner politician" after he entered politics. He served for a time as Minister of the Civil Service and Administrative Reform and for a time as Minister of Youth, Sports, Culture, and the Arts.

Zeng Ebome was Minister of Social Affairs, National Solidarity and the Family as of January 1997. He was then appointed as Minister of Human Rights and Relations with the Constitutional Institutions on 25 January 1999. Speaking before the United Nations Commission on Human Rights on 24 March 1999, he stressed the importance and universality of human rights and said that "in Gabon, we believe that the full realization of human beings is in freedom". He also said that rich countries should work to readjust their economic relationships with poor countries, especially by cancelling debt owed by poor countries.

Following the December 2001 parliamentary election, the election for the second seat from Woleu Department was held over again on 26 May 2002, and Zeng Ebome was victorious, receiving 52.11% of the vote and defeating Fidele Bengone-Bayi of the ruling Gabonese Democratic Party (PDG). Zeng Ebome was the only MAD candidate to win a seat in the 2001–2002 election. During the parliamentary term that followed the election, Zeng Ebome was Vice-President of the Group of Republican Democrats (GDR), a parliamentary group composed of deputies from small parties allied with the PDG. On 8 January 2003, he was elected as President of the National Council for Democracy, an official body tasked with mediating disputes between political parties. The Council included present and former heads of government and both houses of Parliament, as well as political party leaders.

Zeng Ebome supported President Omar Bongo's candidacy in the November 2005 presidential election and worked for his re-election. As a representative of the Presidential Majority, Zeng Ebome was included on the joint majority–opposition commission on the reform of the electoral process, which began its work in May 2006 and included 12 representatives from the Presidential Majority as well as 12 from the opposition.

In the December 2006 parliamentary election, Zeng Ebome was re-elected to the National Assembly as a MAD candidate, again winning the second seat (Ellelem) in Woleu Department; he received 58.23% of the vote, while the PDG candidate, Jacqueline Atsame Allogo, received only 13.86%. As was the case in the previous election, Zeng Ebome was the only MAD candidate to win a seat in the National Assembly. During the parliamentary term that followed the 2006 election, he was an ordinary member of the GDR parliamentary group.

In September 2007, Zeng Ebome, acting as spokesman for leaders of the Presidential Majority, expressed firm support for President Bongo's project to exploit iron deposits in Bélinga in a statement on national television. He also criticized non-governmental organizations that opposed the project. When Bongo laid the foundation stone for the University of Oyem on 20 December 2007, Zeng Ebome spoke on the occasion and thanked Bongo.

MAD held its Fourth Congress on 10 February 2008, reaffirming its participation in the Presidential Majority and re-electing Zeng Ebome as its President. Following Bongo's death in June 2009, the party went into opposition, supporting the independent candidacy of Casimir Oyé-Mba in the August 2009 presidential election.

On 30 December 2009, various opposition leaders, including Zeng Ebome, announced plans for the creation of a new, united opposition party. Zeng Ebome then held a brief extraordinary congress of the MAD on 8 February 2010, at which he confirmed that his party would cease to exist. Although Zeng Ebome had been continuously re-elected to the National Assembly as a MAD candidate, his party remained very small, unable to muster support outside of his stronghold of Ellelem.

Zeng Ebome's announcement was followed by the launch of a unified opposition party, the National Union (UN), on 10 February 2010. The UN was created through the merger of the MAD with two other opposition parties, and it grouped an assortment of opposition leaders; Zeng Ebome was designated as one of the UN's five Vice-Presidents.

Zeng Ebome was hospitalized in Libreville in April 2010 and underwent surgery. He was then flown to Paris for further treatment on 2 May 2010. He died at the Saint-Louis hospital in Paris in the early hours of 19 May 2010. Confirming his death through a statement later in the day, UN President Zacharie Myboto described Zeng Ebome as an "illustrious patriot and fighter for democracy" and expressed condolences to Zeng Ebome's wife, Marie Constance, and his children.
