= Emmanuel Ondo Methogo =

Gabonese politician

Emmanuel Ondo Methogo (born 24 June 1946) is a Gabonese politician. A member of the ruling Gabonese Democratic Party (Parti démocratique gabonais, PDG), he was a minister in the government from 1991 to 2007. Subsequently he served as President of the National Council of Communication (CNC).

== Life and career ==
Ondo Methogo was born in Bitam. He was an adviser to President Omar Bongo, in charge of economic and financial questions and relations with international financial institutions, from 1987 to 1990. In the 1990 parliamentary election, he was elected to the National Assembly as an independent candidate in Woleu-Ntem Province. Subsequently he was appointed to the government in 1991 as Minister of Planning, the Economy, and Urban and Regional Planning (Aménagement du territoire). In 1994, he was moved to the post of Minister of Agriculture, Animal Husbandry, and Rural Development.

In the 1996 parliamentary election, Ondo Methogo was again elected to the National Assembly from Woleu-Ntem, this time as a PDG candidate. He remained in the government after the election and was promoted to the position of Minister of State in charge of Agriculture, Animal Husbandry, and Rural Development on 28 January 1997. After two years in that position, he was appointed as Deputy Prime Minister for Justice in January 1999 and then as Deputy Prime Minister for National Solidarity, Social Affairs and Welfare in December 1999. Following the December 2001 parliamentary election, in which Ondo Methogo was again elected to the National Assembly as a PDG candidate in Woleu-Ntem Province, he was moved to the position of Deputy Prime Minister for Urban and Regional Planning (Aménagement du territoire) on 27 January 2002. He held that post until being appointed as Deputy Prime Minister in charge of Relations with Parliament and the Coordination of Interministerial Commissions on 21 January 2006. In the December 2006 parliamentary election, he was elected to the National Assembly again; he was then named Deputy Prime Minister in charge of Relations with Parliament and the Constitutional Institutions on 25 January 2007. After a little less than a year, he was dismissed from the government on 28 December 2007; he then returned to the National Assembly as a deputy.

His appointment as President of the National Council of Communication (CNC) was announced on 22 January 2009; the CNC is a nine-member body tasked with regulating the national media. Opposition leader Zacharie Myboto argued that the manner in which Ondo Methogo became President of the CNC—succeeding François Engogah Owono, who was appointed to the government—was unconstitutional. In late May 2009, when Myboto raised the matter in the National Assembly, Prime Minister Jean Eyéghé Ndong suggested that he take his complaint to the Constitutional Court.

Later, Ondo Methogo served as Political Adviser to President Ali Bongo. He was dismissed from that post on 10 June 2014.

Following the December 2014 Senate election, Ondo Methogo was elected as Third Vice-President of the Senate on 27 February 2015.
