= Paul Mba Abessole =

Gabonese politician

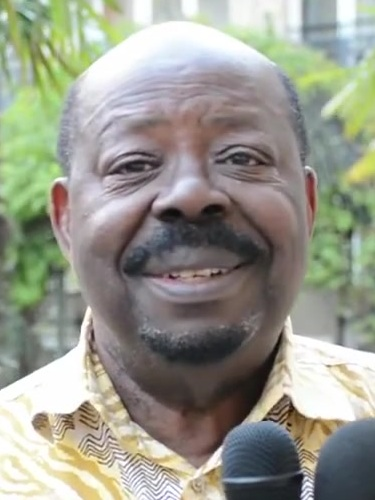
Paul Mba Abessole (2015)

Paul Mba Abessole (born October 9, 1939) is a Gabonese politician who heads the National Woodcutters' Rally – Rally for Gabon (Rassemblement national des Bûcherons - Rassemblement pour le Gabon, RNB-RPG) and was a leading opponent of President Omar Bongo during the 1990s. He stood as a presidential candidate twice during the 1990s and also served as Mayor of Libreville, the capital. From 2002 to 2009 he served in the government of Gabon, holding the rank of Deputy Prime Minister for most of that period.

== Career ==
Mba Abessole was born at Ngnung-Ako, located in northern Gabon, in 1939. He attended a French seminary and was ordained as a Catholic priest on 30 June 1968. He worked as a priest in Gabon until 1976, when he went to France, where he then lived in exile. As a critic of President Bongo and the single-party regime of the Gabonese Democratic Party (PDG), he sought to stand as a candidate against Bongo in the 1979 presidential election, but was unable to do so.

Mba Abessole was the exiled leader of MORENA during the 1980s and argued for peaceful political change in Gabon. President Bongo, hoping to indicate that he was open to reform, allowed Mba Abessole to visit Gabon for a week in May 1989. On that occasion he was "treated more as a visiting dignitary than the leader of a suppressed political party"; Bongo met with him and said that he would consider Mba Abessole's proposed reforms. This conciliatory attitude from Bongo annoyed some PDG hard-liners. Following M'ba Abessole's May 1989 visit, he returned to Gabon on a permanent basis in November 1989. Bongo offered to appoint Mba Abessole as Minister of Justice after the March–April 1990 National Conference, but Mba Abessole refused to participate in the government.

In the 1990 parliamentary election, Mba Abessole stood as a MORENA candidate in Libreville. In the first round, he received 49.44% of the vote in his constituency, slightly less than the majority required for a first round victory; suspecting fraud, he refused to participate in the second round and called for a boycott of the second round.

On October 5, 1993, Mba Abessole announced his candidacy for the December 1993 presidential election. He was the main opposition candidate in the election and placed second with 26.5%, according to official results, while Bongo was credited with a narrow first round majority. Denouncing the official results as fraudulent, Mba Abessole declared himself President and appointed RNB First Secretary Pierre-André Kombila as Prime Minister. His house in Libreville, along with the opposition radio station Radio Liberty, was destroyed by the Presidential Guard in February 1994, and he went to Paris. In March 1994, Prime Minister Casimir Oye Mba offered to include the RNB in the government, but Mba Abessole rejected the offer. He also refused to participate in the government of Prime Minister Paulin Obame-Nguema, which was formed after the signing of the Paris Accords between the government and the opposition in October 1994.

The RNB won the late 1996 municipal election in Libreville, and Mba Abessole was then elected as Mayor of Libreville by the city councillors on 19 January 1997; he received 68 out of 98 votes. Mba Abessole also stood in the December 1996 parliamentary election as a candidate in the fifth arrondissement of Libreville, but he was defeated by Jean-François Ntoutoume Emane.

Prior to the December 1998 presidential election, Kombila was expelled from the party in July 1998, leading Kombila's supporters to form their own faction and nominate Kombila as their presidential candidate later in the month. Mba Abessole, who continued to lead the other faction, accused Kombila of "treachery and indiscipline". Mba Abessole was officially designated as his faction's presidential candidate at an extraordinary congress in Libreville in early October 1998. He was considered the most best-known opposition leader in Gabon; however, his credibility as an opposition leader was thought to have suffered, and it was believed that the RNB split would have a negative impact on his candidacy. In the election, he took third place with 13.16% of the vote, according to official results; Bongo won an overwhelming majority, while Pierre Mamboundou, who was perceived as a more radical opposition leader than Mba Abessole, placed second.

Mba Abessole defeated Jean Eyeghe Ndong for a seat in the National Assembly in the December 2001 parliamentary election, and on January 27, 2002 he was appointed to the government as Minister of State for Human Rights. He was subsequently promoted to the position of Deputy Prime Minister for Agriculture, Animal Husbandry, and Rural Development, in charge of Human Rights, on January 21, 2003. Later, his portfolio was modified and he was named Deputy Prime Minister for Transport, Civil Aviation, and Human Rights.

On April 23, 2004, Mba Abessole joined the Presidential Majority, the alliance of parties supporting President Bongo. A youth movement, the Movement of the Children of Bongo Ondimba, then asked Mba Abessole to serve as Bongo's campaign manager for the 2005 presidential election; it also wanted him to become Prime Minister if Bongo won the election. Bongo accepted this as a possibility, and on June 26, 2004, Mba Abessole said that he was willing to take up the responsibility. However, others in the Presidential Majority resisted the idea of Mba Abessole becoming Bongo's campaign manager.

He and Eyeghe Ndong faced each other again in the December 2006 parliamentary election, this time with Eyeghe Ndong holding the position of Prime Minister, and Mba Abessole was defeated. President Bongo said that holding a ministerial position was not dependent on winning a parliamentary seat and that Mba Abessole could remain a member of the government. In the new government, announced on January 25, 2007, Mba Abessole was moved to the position of Deputy Prime Minister at the Presidency in charge of Recasting, Human Rights, the Coordination of Great Work and Revolving Festivals.

In a Senate by-election held on July 1, 2007, Mba Abessole was elected to the first seat from the second arrondissement of Libreville, which had been vacated by Eyeghe Ndong. Mba Abessole was the only candidate for the seat and received the votes of all of the 20 electors in this indirect election. In the government named on December 28, 2007, he was moved to the position of Deputy Prime Minister for Culture, Arts, Community Education, Refoundation and Human Rights.

Mba Abessole headed the RPG's list in the second arrondissement of Libreville during the April 2008 local elections. Subsequently he filed an unsuccessful challenge with the Constitutional Court related to the election.

Following Omar Bongo's death in June 2009, the RPG held its 11th Extraordinary Congress on 11 July 2009 and nominated Mba Abessole, its President, as the party's candidate for the 30 August 2009 presidential election. He was immediately backed by three other parties: the National Recovery Movement (MORENA) and the National Rally of Woodcutters (RNB), both part of the Presidential Majority, as well as the Party of Equal Opportunity (PEC), an opposition party. Mba Abessole was then excluded from the government appointed on 22 July 2009 under Prime Minister Paul Biyoghé Mba.

Together with several other candidates, Mba Abessole was present at a banned demonstration calling for the resignation of PDG presidential candidate Ali-Ben Bongo from the government on 7 August 2009. In mid-August he said in reference to the PDG's selection of Bongo (Omar Bongo's son) as its candidate that "we are faced with a monarchy that wants to impose itself in our country" and that "we have to fight until the monarchists are thrown out".

In late August, immediately prior to the election, Mba Abessole and four other candidates announced that they were withdrawing their candidacies in favor of André Mba Obame, a former PDG minister who was standing as an independent candidate. Mba Obame placed second in the election with 26% of the vote, behind Bongo. The election was followed by serious violence in Port-Gentil. A few days after the announcement of results, Mba Abessole tried to travel to Côte d'Ivoire but was barred from doing so by police, who said that they were under orders to not allow opposition leaders to leave the country. The Interior Ministry explained on 9 September 2009 that this was because of a government investigation into the Port-Gentil rioting.

In the December 2011 parliamentary election, Mba Abessole was elected to the National Assembly, winning the third seat for Komo-Kango Department. In an election that saw the ruling PDG win an overwhelming majority of seats amidst an opposition boycott, Mba Abessole was one of only a handful of non-PDG candidates to win parliamentary seats. When the National Assembly began meeting for its new parliamentary term, Mba Abessole chaired the initial proceedings due to his status as the oldest deputy at age 72. He was then elected as the Fifth Vice-President of the National Assembly on 27 February 2012.
