= Pierre-André Kombila =

Gabonese politician, academic and medical doctor (1941–2026)

Pierre-André Kombila Koumba (8 May 1941 – 15 October 2026) was a Gabonese politician, academic and medical doctor. He was the First Secretary of the National Rally of Woodcutters (RNB), Gabon's main opposition party, from 1990 to 1998; he then led a split from the RNB, establishing the more radical National Rally of Woodcutters - Democrats (RNB-D) in 1998. Kombila was nominated as the RNB-D's candidate for the 1998 presidential election, but received only a small share of the vote. Later, he abandoned his opposition to President Omar Bongo and joined the government, serving as Minister of Technical and Vocational Education from 2006 to 2009 and as Minister of Hydraulic Resources and New Energies in 2009. Following Bongo's death, he rejoined the opposition in mid-2009.

== Education and medical career ==
Kombila was born in Lac Anengué, near Port-Gentil on 8 May 1941. He studied medicine in France, becoming a cardiologist; he was also a member of the Federation of Black African Students in France. After graduating, Kombila declined job opportunities in Europe and chose to return home to Gabon in 1977; he was personally congratulated by President Omar Bongo on 6 September 1977. In 1978, he founded the cardiology department at the Central Hospital of Libreville.

An internationally respected cardiologist, he was a member of the Pan-African Cardiology Society, as well as an associate member and correspondent of the French Cardiology Society.

== Political career during the 1990s ==
As an opposition politician, Kombila became First Secretary of the National Rally of Woodcutters (RNB) in 1990 and was elected to the National Assembly as an RNB candidate in the Moabi constituency of Nyanga Province in the 1990 parliamentary election. He was designated as the Chairman of the Committee for Free and Democratic Elections, an opposition body, in June 1993.

Paul Mba Abessole, the President of the RNB, stood as the party's presidential candidate in the December 1993 presidential election. Official results showed President Bongo defeating Mba Abessole with a narrow first round majority of 51%; however, Mba Abessole said that he was the actual winner, declaring himself President and naming Kombila as his Prime Minister. Speaking to the Associated Press on this occasion, Kombila described the official results as "fraudulent" and said that he intended to form "a fighting government".

Kombila remained a Deputy in the National Assembly until 1996 and was the publisher of the opposition paper Le Bûcheron. He was convicted of libel against President Bongo in January 1998 after Le Bûcheron published claims that Bongo practiced witchcraft, and he received a fine and a four-month suspended prison sentence.

Prior to the December 1998 presidential election, Kombila was expelled from the RNB in July 1998, leading Kombila's supporters to form their own faction and nominate Kombila as their presidential candidate later in the month. Mba Abessole, who headed the other faction, accused Kombila of "treachery and indiscipline". As the candidate of the RNB-D, Kombila received 1.5% of the vote according to official results, well short of Mba Abessole's 13%. Omar Bongo won the election with over 66% of the vote; Kombila alleged widespread fraud.

== Political career from the late 1990s ==
Kombila was appointed Director-General of Health in the late 1990s; he was subsequently appointed Inspector-General of Health before being appointed Director-General of Health again. In January 2000, he expressed disappointment with the prevalence of disease in Africa, saying that "this is not the African renaissance we expected"; furthermore, he said that, although Africans did "not expect outside solutions ... people must understand that these are not just our problems anymore. With globalization, they are everybody's." He said in December 2003 that an insufficient and declining rate of child vaccination in Gabon was leading to worrying increases in the prevalence of measles, whooping cough, tuberculosis, and neo-natal tetanus. Speaking in early 2004, he criticized traditional healers for spreading harmful, unscientific ideas, such as the notion that AIDS could be cured by having sex with a virgin.

Prior to the November 2005 presidential election, Kombila was President of the Medical Commission for the presidential candidates; in that capacity, he was charged with evaluating the health of the candidates and determining whether they were in an appropriate physical condition to run for office. He reviewed Bongo's health on 10 October 2005. By the time of the 2005 election, Kombila had receded from prominence in Gabonese politics, but following Bongo's victory he was appointed to the government as Minister of State for Technical Education, Vocational Education, and the Professional Employment of Youth on 21 January 2006.

In the December 2006 parliamentary election, Kombila was again elected to the National Assembly, winning the first seat in Moabi constituency as an RNB-D candidate. He was retained in his ministerial portfolio after the election, although he was subsequently reduced to the rank of ordinary minister on 29 December 2007. At the RNB-D's Third Ordinary Congress on 25–26 January 2008, the RNB-D decided to formally join the Presidential Majority and Kombila was elected to the newly created position of RNB-D President.

=== 2009 events ===
Following President Bongo's death on 8 June 2009, Kombila was moved to the position of Minister of Hydraulic Resources and New Energies on 19 June 2009. Subsequently, he and the RNB-D chose to support opposition candidate Pierre Mamboundou in the 30 August 2009 presidential election, and when a new government under Paul Biyoghé Mba was appointed on 22 July 2009, Kombila was not included. Kombila said that Biyoghé Mba was in office merely "to organize the victory of a candidate" (referring to PDG candidate Ali-Ben Bongo) and that he should resign along with his government; he also said that Interim President Rose Francine Rogombé should meet with the political class to discuss setting up a different structure to organize the election.

PDG candidate Ali Bongo won the election according to official results. Opposition supporters in Port-Gentil began rioting following the announcement of results. As an opposition leader, Kombila was critical of the government's response to the rioting; on 9 September 2009 he said that 15 bodies were present in a local morgue and that scores of people might have been killed. He also suggested there might be credibility in a rumor that soldiers had been throwing dead bodies into the sea. Minister of Communications Laure Olga Gondjout said later on 9 September that only three people had been killed and that soldiers had not been involved in those deaths. She also criticized Kombila and other opposition leaders for their conduct in the wake of the election: "There are people who have used the media, used some journalists to appeal to hatred, to insurrection. Unfortunately, Gabonese youths are being brought before justice while the leaders are hiding in their homes."

== Death ==
Kombila died on 15 October 2026, at the age of 85.
