= André Mba Obame =

Gabonese politician

André Mba Obame (15 June 1957 – 12 April 2015) was a Gabonese politician. After serving as an adviser to President Omar Bongo in the 1980s, he was a minister in the government of Gabon from 1990 to 1991 and again from 1997 to 2009; during that time, he was identified with the reformist wing of the ruling Gabonese Democratic Party (PDG). He held the key post of Minister of the Interior from 2006 to 2009 and then briefly served as Minister of the Coordination and Follow-up of Government Action in mid-2009. He was an independent candidate in the 30 August 2009 presidential election and placed third with 25.33% of the vote, according to official results, but he claimed victory and alleged that the PDG candidate, Ali Bongo, won through fraud.

== Political career ==
Mba Obame was born in Medouneu, located in northern Gabon. He was President Omar Bongo's deputy adviser for African and international affairs from 1984 to 1986 and then adviser to the president for development and public and productive investments before being appointed to the government as Minister of Agriculture, Animal Husbandry, and the Rural Economy in April 1990. Subsequently he was moved to the post of Minister of Human Rights and Relations with the Assemblies in November 1990. Mba Obame was viewed as a PDG reformist in the early 1990s, along with Bongo's son Ali Bongo. A 1991 legal change sought by party leaders required that ministers be at least 35 years old, thus forcing his departure from the government, along with Ali-Ben Bongo. From 1991 to 1994, Mba Obame was Deputy Secretary-General of the Presidency of the Republic, and from 1994 to 1997 he was High Commissioner under the Minister of the Interior.

In the December 1996 parliamentary election, Mba Obame won a seat in the National Assembly as a PDG candidate in Woleu-Ntem Province; he then returned to the government as Minister of Relations with Parliament and the Assemblies, as well as Government Spokesman, on 28 January 1997. After Bongo won re-election according to the official results of the December 1998 presidential election (disputed by the opposition), Mba Obame said that "the campaign was of high quality and the Gabonese showed maturity and serenity which can only add credibility to the Gabonese political system".

Following Bongo's re-election, Mba Obame was moved to the post of Minister of National Education on 25 January 1999, while remaining Government Spokesman. In the December 2001 parliamentary election, he was re-elected to the National Assembly as a PDG candidate in Woleu-Ntem Province, and after that election he was moved from his position as Minister of National Education to that of Minister of National Solidarity, Social Affairs and Welfare on 27 January 2002. On 21 January 2006, he was promoted to the position of Minister of State for the Interior, Security and Immigration.

In the December 2006 parliamentary election, he was elected to the National Assembly as the PDG candidate in Medouneu Commune. His ministerial portfolio was modified on 28 December 2007, when he was appointed as Minister of the Interior, Local Collectivities, Decentralization, Security, and Immigration (without the rank of Minister of State).

As Interior Minister, Mba Obame encountered strong criticism in the press after he reportedly proposed selling Mbiané—a small, uninhabited island lying in potentially oil-rich waters—to neighboring Equatorial Guinea.

Following the death of President Bongo on 8 June 2009, Mba Obame asserted that the presidential succession was "strictly following the constitutional route, contrary to supposition and Machiavellian plans attributed to one person or another, particularly the defence minister", a reference to the widely held belief that Ali-Ben Bongo, the Minister of Defense, was a likely successor. In the government named on 19 June 2009, he was moved to the position of Minister of the Coordination and Follow-up of Government Action. Jean-François Ndongou succeeded him at the Interior Ministry in a ceremony held on 24 June.

=== 2009 presidential election ===
Shortly after the PDG leadership chose Ali-Ben Bongo as the party's presidential candidate, Mba Obame announced in Barcelona on 17 July 2009 that he would stand as a presidential candidate himself. According to Mba Obame, he was ready to be President "after twenty-five years of learning and working closely alongside the late President Omar Bongo". He was then excluded from the government on 22 July 2009.

Mba Obame spoke before the Confederation of Gabonese Employers on 12 August 2009, saying that if elected he would "bring order and discipline to the Gabonese administration" and that he would cooperate with Gabonese employers to "ensure that the State grants you certain facilities and protects you against unfair competition and red tape". He also addressed rumors that businessmen and foreigners were leaving the country in anticipation of post-election violence, "reassur[ing] everyone that the major concern of all 23 presidential candidates is the preservation and consolidation of peace and national unity that we inherited from the late President Omar Bongo Ondimba. There will be no trouble in Gabon."

In late August, a few days before the election, various opposition candidates gathered for negotiations and held a secret ballot to choose a joint candidate. The vote concluded early on 28 August and André Mba Obame was declared the victor. A statement was then sent to the press announcing that 11 candidates were withdrawing from the election and rallying behind Mba Obame's candidacy. However, several of the candidates—Casimir Oyé-Mba, Jules-Aristide Bourdes-Ogouliguende, Victoire Lasseni Duboze, and Bruno Ben Moubamba—promptly denied this, saying that they were still running and did not support Mba Obame. After a brief period of confusion, five candidates publicly rallied behind Mba Obame, withdrawing their own candidacies: Paul Mba Abessole, Jean Eyeghé Ndong, Mehdi Teale, Claudine Ayo Assayi, and Jean Ntoutoume Ngoua. Praising the withdrawing candidates, Mba Obame called them a "dream team" and declared that with their support he could not lose.

Despite this show of support, when the Constitutional Court announced the final, official election results on 13 October 2009, the top three candidates were Ali Bongo Ondimba with 41.79% of the vote, followed by Pierre Mamboundou (25.64%), and André Mba Obame (25.33%). In terms of raw vote totals, Ali Bongo Ondimba received 141,665 votes; Pierre Mamboundou received 86,875 votes; and André Mba Obame received 85,814 votes.

On 30 December 2009, the planned creation of a new, united opposition party was announced, and Mba Obame was among the various opposition leaders participating in it. Mba Obame joined the Gabonese Union for Democracy and Development (UGDD), a party led by Zacharie Myboto, on 6 February 2010, and the UGDD then merged with two other parties to create a unified opposition party, the National Union. At the party's launch on 10 February 2010, Mba Obame was designated as its Executive Secretary, while Myboto was designated as its President.

On 25 January 2011, Mba Obame declared himself president, citing the example of Côte d'Ivoire, where Alassane Ouattara was internationally recognised as the legitimate winner of the 2010 presidential election while incumbent Laurent Gbagbo refused to step down. Mba Obame took refuge in a United Nations office in Libreville and also appointed a government of 18 ministers; in response, Bongo declared Mba Obame's National Union dissolved and Mba Obame's parliamentary mandate void.

After several years of illness, Mba Obame died in Yaoundé, Cameroon, on 12 April 2015. The Gabonese government planned to fly his body from Libreville to Oyem in the north on 29 April 2015, but was unable to do so due to opposition supporters crowding at the airport.
