= Jean Eyeghé Ndong =

20th and 21st-century Prime Minister of Gabon

Jean Eyeghe Ndong
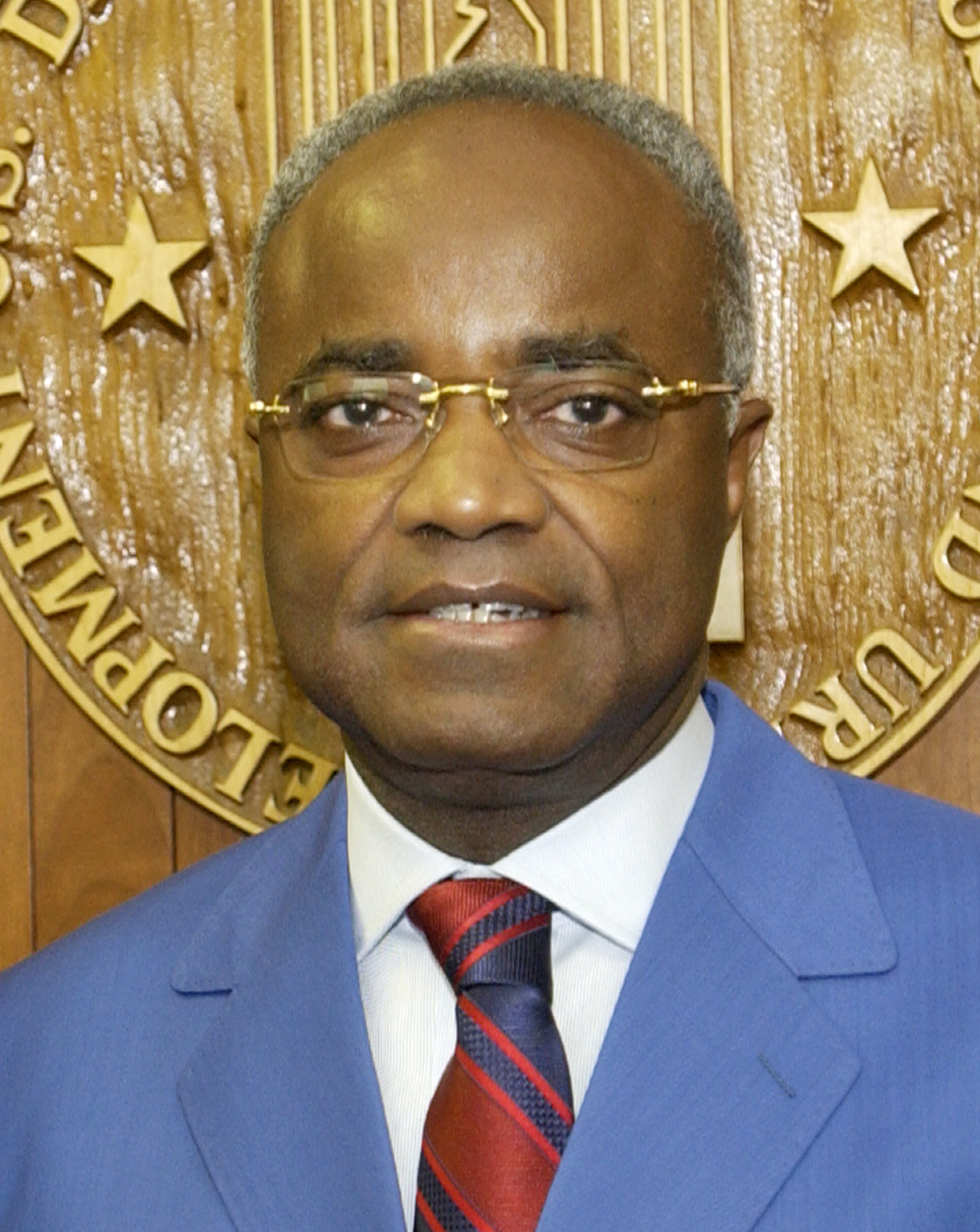
- Eyeghe Ndong in 2007

6th Prime Minister of Gabon
- In office 20 January 2006 – 17 July 2009
- President: Omar Bongo; Didjob Divungi Di Ndinge (Acting); Rose Francine Rogombé (Acting)
- Preceded by: Jean-François Ntoutoume Emane
- Succeeded by: Paul Biyoghé Mba

Personal details
- Born: 12 February 1946 (age 80) Libreville, French Equatorial Africa (present day Gabon)

Jean Eyeghé Ndong (born 12 February 1946) is a Gabonese politician. He was the Prime Minister of Gabon from January 20, 2006 to July 17, 2009. He was also the First Vice-president of the Gabonese Democratic Party (PDG) until 2009.

Eyeghé Ndong resigned as prime minister in July 2009 and announced his intention to stand as an independent candidate in the August 2009 presidential election. Subsequently, he withdrew his candidacy in favor of a joint opposition candidate, André Mba Obame, and acted as spokesman for the opposition. He has been vice-president of the National Union, a unified opposition party, since its creation in February 2010.

== Political career ==
Eyeghé Ndong, who was born in Libreville on 12 February 1946, is a nephew of Léon M'ba, who was President of Gabon from 1960 to 1967. He was administrative director of the National Social Security Fund (CNSS) from 1984 to 1990, then Deputy Director-General of the CNSS from 1990 to 1991 and Deputy Director-General of the National Social Guarantee Fund from 1991 to 1996.

In the December 1996 parliamentary election, Eyeghé Ndong won a seat in the National Assembly of Gabon as a PDG candidate in the second arrondissement of Libreville. He was then appointed to the government as Secretary of State under the Minister of Finance on 28 January 1997 and therefore did not sit in the National Assembly until 1999, when he was excluded from the first government of Prime Minister Jean-François Ntoutoume Emane.

Eyeghé Ndong again ran as the PDG candidate for the first seat from the second arrondissement of Libreville in the December 2001 parliamentary election, but on that occasion he was defeated by Paul Mba Abessole of the National Rally of Woodcutters - Rally for Gabon (RNB-RPG). In the first round he placed second with 32.54% of the vote, behind Mba Abessole's 38.52%. Despite his failure to win a seat, he was appointed to Ntoutoume Emane's government as Minister-Delegate under the Minister of State for the Economy, Finance, the Budget, and Privatization on January 27, 2002; he worked in that capacity alongside another minister-delegate, Senturel Ngoma Madoungou. In the December 29, 2002 local elections, he was elected as a municipal councillor in Libreville, and he was subsequently elected to the Senate.

Eyeghé Ndong remained in his position as minister-delegate at the Ministry of Finance for four years. He was then appointed to succeed Ntoutoume Emane as prime minister on January 20, 2006, one day after President Omar Bongo was sworn in for another term. He was also named vice-president of the PDG in October 2006.

Competing for the first seat in the 2nd and 6th Arrondissements of Libreville, Eyeghé Ndong and Mba Abessole faced each other again in the December 2006 parliamentary election. Thus Eyeghé Ndong, the prime minister, challenged Mba Abessole, who was deputy prime minister. Eyeghé Ndong was victorious, winning 66.52% of the vote. Eyeghé Ndong submitted the resignation of his government to Bongo on January 19, 2007, observing a constitutional requirement that the government resign after the results of a parliamentary election were announced by the Constitutional Court. On January 24, Bongo asked Eyeghé Ndong to form a new government, and Eyeghé Ndong accepted; the composition of the new government was announced on January 25, with few changes. A new government under Eyeghé Ndong was named on December 28, 2007, with its size reduced from 50 to 41 ministers.

In the April 2008 local elections, Eyeghé Ndong prevailed in the second arrondissement of Libreville, again defeating Mba Abessole. A new 44-member government headed by Eyeghé Ndong was appointed on October 7, 2008.

=== 2009 events ===
Following the death of President Bongo on June 8, 2009, Senate President Rose Francine Rogombé succeeded him on June 10 as interim President, in line with the constitution. Although the Constitutional Court ruled that the functions of Eyeghé Ndong's government ended upon Rogombé's swearing in, his government nevertheless remained in place for over a week during the period of Bongo's funeral and its preparations. After Bongo was buried on June 18, Eyeghé Ndong and his government resigned on June 19. Rogombé promptly reappointed Eyeghé Ndong at the head of a government virtually identical in composition to his previous government. It included 48 members; no members of the government were dismissed, although some ministers were moved to different portfolios.

Eyeghé Ndong sought the PDG nomination for the early presidential election, but the PDG leadership instead selected Defense Minister Ali-Ben Bongo (Omar Bongo's son) as the party's presidential candidate. He then resigned as prime minister on 17 July 2009 and announced he was running as an independent candidate; Rogombé appointed Paul Biyoghé Mba to succeed him on the same day. Eyeghe Ndong said that he made his decision because there had not truly been a consensus in favor of Bongo, and that therefore the proper internal party procedure was not respected. Following his resignation as Prime Minister and as First Vice-president of the PDG, he said on 21 July that he had difficulty carrying out his work as Prime Minister due to a lack of cohesion in the government and lack of support from some "very powerful" ministers. While complaining that the government accomplished little, he said that he did not give up and had "still tried to do something".

Whilst campaigning in August, Eyeghé Ndong stated that the people wanted "new governance", meaning an end to "the Bongo system" and the "embezzling of public funds and illicit enrichment".

In late August 2009, Eyeghé Ndong called for the opposition candidates to join in support of a single candidate to face Bongo. Various opposition candidates gathered for negotiations at a meeting chaired by Eyeghé Ndong and held a secret ballot to choose a joint candidate. The vote concluded early on 28 August and André Mba Obame—a former minister who was running as an independent—was declared the victor. Eyeghé Ndong and four other candidates then publicly rallied behind Mba Obame, withdrawing their own candidacies. A representative of Eyeghé Ndong said that the withdrawing candidates were putting the call of the people ahead of their own egos.

=== National Union ===
On 30 December 2009, the planned creation of a new, united opposition party was announced, and Eyeghé Ndong was among the various opposition leaders participating in it. He said on the occasion that, by uniting, they were expressing a "common will to build a better future". Eyeghé Ndong then joined the African Development Movement (MAD), a minor opposition party led by Pierre-Claver Zeng Ebome, and the MAD then merged with two other parties to create a new party, the National Union (Union nationale, UN), which was announced on 10 February 2010. The UN grouped an assortment of major opposition politicians; Zacharie Myboto became its president, while Eyeghé Ndong was designated as one of its five vice-presidents.

Eyeghé Ndong was elected to the Senate in December 2014. Along with fellow opposition leader Jean Ping, he participated in a protest against President Bongo on 20 December 2014, and he was affected by tear gas fired by police trying to break up the protest.

== Personal life ==
He has been married to Gisèle Eyeghé Ndong (née Biyoghé) since 1971 and has six children.
