= Union of the Gabonese People =

Political party in Gabon

Union of the Gabonese People Union du peuple gabonais
- Secretary-General: Fidèle Waura
- Founded: 14 July 1989
- Ideology: Social democracy
- Political position: Centre-left
- Senate: 1 / 100

Website
- http://upg-ga.com/

The Union of the Gabonese People (French: Union du peuple gabonais, UPG) is an opposition political party in Gabon. It was led by Pierre Mamboundou until his death in 2011.

== History ==
Mamboundou announced the UPG's establishment in Paris on 14 July 1989, during the single-party rule of the Gabonese Democratic Party (PDG). Three members were arrested in October 1989, accused of involvement in a planned coup. This resulted in Mamboundou being expelled from France. The party was officially registered in 1991, and Mamboundou was allowed to return to Gabon on 2 November 1993. However, his candidacy for the December 1993 presidential elections was rejected, resulting in party supporters rioting in Libreville.

The party was able to contest the 1996 parliamentary elections, winning a single seat in the National Assembly. Mamboundou was the UPG candidate in the 1998 presidential elections, finishing second behind incumbent Omar Bongo with 16.5% of the vote. However, the party failed to win a seat in the 2001 parliamentary elections.

Mamboundou was the UPG candidate for the 2005 presidential elections, again finishing second to Bongo, this time with 14% of the vote. The party won eight seats in the parliamentary elections the following year. The 2009 presidential elections saw Mamboundou run for a third time, finishing third in a field of eighteen candidates with 25% of the vote.

After Mamboundou's death in October 2011, the party suffered from factionalism. Although most opposition parties boycotted the December 2011 parliamentary elections, the UPG participated, losing all eight seats.

On 11 September 2015, President Ali Bongo Ondimba appointed Dieudonné Moukagni Iwangou, a hardline opposition leader and UPG faction leader, as Minister of State for Agriculture in an effort to incorporate the opposition into the government, but Iwangou refused to accept the position. Mathieu Mboumba Nziengui, another UPG faction leader, was instead appointed to the same post on 13 September. The party immediately dismissed Nziengui from his post as Executive Secretary.

== Notable people ==
- Jean-Félix Mouloungui
