= National Woodcutters' Rally – Democratic =

Political party in Gabon

The National Woodcutters Rally–Democratic (French: Rassemblement National des Bûcherons–Democratique, RNB-D), also known as National Woodcutters Rally–Kombila (RNB-Kombila) is a political party in Gabon.

== History ==
The RNB-D was formed in July 1998 by supporters of Pierre-André Kombila, who had been expelled from the National Woodcutters' Rally. Kombila ran in the December 1998 presidential elections, finishing fourth in a field of eight candidates with 1.5% of the vote. In the 2001 parliamentary elections the party won a single seat in the National Assembly.

In the parliamentary election held on 9 December 2001, the party won one out of 120 seats. In the 17 December/24 December 2006 parliamentary election, the party also won one out of 120 seats.

The party did not nominate a candidate for the 2005 presidential elections, but retained its seat in the National Assembly in the 2006 parliamentary elections.

At the RNB-D's Third Ordinary Congress on 25 and 26 January 2008, the party decided to formally join the Presidential Majority and Kombila was elected to the newly created position of RNB-D President. Alexis Mengue Méyé was elected as secretary-general.

The party lost its single seat in the 2011 parliamentary elections.
