= Zacharie Myboto =

Gabonese politician (born 1938)

Zacharie Myboto (born 1938) is a Gabonese politician and President of the National Union (UN), an opposition party. He was the Administrative Secretary of the Gabonese Democratic Party (PDG) from 1972 to 1990 and served in the government from 1978 to 2001. After resigning from the government, he became an opposition leader, founding the Gabonese Union for Democracy and Development (UGDD) in 2005 and placing third in the 2005 presidential election. He became President of the Group of the Forces of Change in the National Assembly in 2007.

In February 2010, the UGDD merged with two other opposition parties to create the National Union, and Myboto became its President.

In November 2021, Paulette Missambo, former Minister of National Education and Health under former President Omar Bongo Ondimba, was elected President of the National Union. the 654 delegates came from all over Gabon to choose Zacharie Myboto successor.

== Political career in the PDG ==
Myboto was born at Omoï, Moanda, located in southeastern Gabon, in 1938. He became a member of the PDG when it was founded in 1968, and he was Director of the Cabinet of the Minister of Water and Forests from September 1968 to May 1971. He joined the PDG Political Bureau at the party's Constitutive Congress in September 1970. After working as Secretary-General of the Gabonese Marble Company (Société Gabonaise de Marbrerie, SOGAMAR) from May 1971 to November 1972, he became the PDG's Administrative Secretary in November 1972.

Later, Myboto was Secretary of State at the Presidency in charge of Information from 4 February 1978 to 26 February 1980 and Minister Delegate at the Presidency in charge of Information, Posts and Telecommunications from February 1980 to 1981. He was then promoted to the position of Minister of Information, Posts and Telecommunications in 1981, and he held that post until February 1990, when he was instead appointed as Minister of Public Works, Equipment, Construction, and Urban and Regional Planning. After 17 years as the PDG's Administrative Secretary, he left that post in January 1990. In the September 1990 parliamentary election, he was elected to the National Assembly as a PDG candidate from the second seat of Lemboumbi-Leyou Department (Mounana), located in Haut Ogooué Province.

In June 1991, Myboto was moved to the position of Minister of Equipment and Construction; he was promoted to the rank of Minister of State for Equipment and Construction on 25 March 1994. In the December 1996 parliamentary election, he was elected to the National Assembly from the second seat of Lemboumbi-Leyou Department as a PDG candidate. He was then retained in the government as Minister of State for Equipment and Construction on 28 January 1997.

== In opposition ==
After 23 years in the government, Myboto—who was considered one of the leading figures in the PDG regime—resigned from the government on 11 January 2001. He then took up his seat in the National Assembly on 1 March 2001. In the December 2001 parliamentary election, he was re-elected to the National Assembly from Mounana.

After leaving the government, Myboto became a critic of the government. He owned L'Autre Journal, a newspaper that was published bimonthly and included articles criticizing the government, but it was suspended by the National Communications Council in December 2003 on the grounds that some of its content could "disturb public order". The offices of L'Autre Journal were searched by the police in March 2004.

Having departed the government four years earlier, Myboto resigned from the PDG on 30 April 2005 and created a new party, the UGDD; as a result, he also resigned from the National Assembly at the same time. Referring to his long history of participation in the PDG regime, he asked the people to forgive his past mistakes. Myboto and members of his family were reportedly subjected to harassment after he left the party, and some of his relatives reportedly lost their government jobs.

On 9 October 2005, Myboto officially announced his candidacy for the 27 November 2005 presidential election before a crowd of over 5,000 supporters. Fiercely critical of Bongo and the government, Myboto alleged that Bongo had won the December 1998 presidential election through fraud. Running as an independent candidate (because the UGDD was not legalized prior to the election), he placed third out of five candidates, winning 6.58% of the vote. Following Bongo's victory, Myboto and second place candidate Pierre Mamboundou called for a general strike in early December, alleging fraud. Later in the month, they legally appealed against the results, asking that they be cancelled due to fraud. The Constitutional Court rejected the appeals on 5 January 2006, confirming Bongo's victory.

As a representative of the opposition, Myboto was included on the joint majority–opposition commission on the reform of the electoral process, which began its work in May 2006 and included 12 representatives from the Presidential Majority and 12 from the opposition. In the December 2006 parliamentary election, he was elected to the National Assembly as the UGDD candidate in Mounana Commune. Following the election, he became the President of the Group of the Forces of Change (GFC), a parliamentary group composed of deputies from various opposition parties, in March 2007.

=== 2009 events ===
President Bongo died on 8 June 2009. Myboto expressed condolences to his family and spoke respectfully of Bongo, referring to his work ensuring "stability and social peace" in Gabon. Regarding the organization of a new presidential election, Myboto met with Interim President Rose Francine Rogombé, together with other opposition leaders, on 24 June 2009. He said that he thought it was "physically impossible" to hold the election within the constitutional 45-day timeframe and spoke of instead holding an election in five to six months. Myboto announced on 20 July that he would stand as a candidate "for a transition" in the election, which was scheduled for 30 August 2009, and that he intended to serve only one term if elected.

In an interview with Radio France Internationale on 24 August 2009, Myboto reiterated his "solemn commitment" to serving only one term of seven years if he won the election; he said that he would use that time to "put Gabon on track" and then "pass the baton" to a "properly elected and credible" successor. Pointing to his resignation from the government in 2001 (which he said was "not easy" to do), he stressed that in order to discourage the tendency of politicians to try to remain in office "forever", it was necessary to lead by example. Myboto also said that he would reform the constitution to restore the presidential two-term limit and "end the life presidency in Gabon". In the same interview, Myboto expressed grave doubts about the fairness of the election, saying that the electoral list was seriously inflated and fraudulent; nevertheless, he said it was still worthwhile to participate in the election so as to do "everything possible" to prevent "monarchy" (in reference to the PDG's nomination of Bongo's son Ali-Ben Bongo as its candidate). When asked what distinguished him from other opposition candidates, Myboto said that, by resigning from the government in 2001, he demonstrated that he "had the courage to say no to the late President Bongo"; he also stressed that he had acquired "long experience in people management and the management of public affairs" through his work as a minister in the government.

According to official results, Myboto placed fourth in the 2009 election with 3.94% of the vote, far behind the top three candidates; Ali Bongo won the election with 42% of the vote. Along with every other candidate (except Bongo), he signed a joint statement denouncing the results as fraudulent. Like the second and third place candidates, André Mba Obame and Mamboundou, he initially went into hiding amidst the violence that followed the announcement of results, although he soon emerged to attend an opposition meeting.

=== National Union ===
On 30 December 2009, the planned creation of a new, united opposition party was announced, and Myboto was among the various opposition leaders participating in it. Myboto then announced the creation of the new party, known as the National Union (Union nationale, UN), on 10 February 2010; the UN was created through the merger of the UGDD with two smaller parties, the African Development Movement (MAD) and the National Republican Rally (RNR). Also included in the new party were three major politicians who ran as independent candidates in the 2009 presidential election: Mba Obame, Casimir Oyé-Mba, and Jean Eyeghé Ndong. When announcing the UN's creation, Myboto described it as "a historic moment", saying that "for the first time in our country, opposition parties have decided to come together for political change".

In the midst of the violence that followed the announcement of Ali Bongo's re-election in August 2016, Myboto was one of the opposition leaders briefly detained at the campaign headquarters of opposition candidate Jean Ping.
