= National Union (Gabon) =

Political party in Gabon

The National Union (French: Union Nationale, UN) is a political party in Gabon.

== History ==
The UN was established in February 2010 by a merger of the African Development Movement (MAD), the Gabonese Union for Democracy and Development (UGDD) and the National Republican Rally (RNR). In the 2006 parliamentary elections the UGDD had won four seats and the MAD one. The new party gained support from several prominent former members of the ruling Gabonese Democratic Party, including former Prime Ministers Casimir Oye Mba and Jean Eyeghe Ndong. Later in February its leader André Mba Obame was elected to the National Assembly in a by-election.

In 2011 the party was banned after Obame declared himself president after refusing to recognise the results of the 2009 presidential elections. As a result, it was prevented from competing in the 2011 parliamentary elections. In February 2015 the ban on the party was lifted.

In November 2021 Paulette Missambo, a former Minister of National Education and Health under former President Omar Bongo Ondimba, was elected party president at a meeting of 654 party delegates, succeeding Zacharie Myboto.
