= Movement for National Rectification–Unionist =

Political party in Gabon

The Movement for National Rectification–Unionist (French: Mouvement de Redressement National–Unioniste, MORENA–Unionist) is a political party in Gabon.

== History ==
The party was established in 1992 by the MP Adrien Nguemah Ondo as a breakaway from the Movement for National Rectification. Nguemah Ondo ran in the 1993 presidential elections, receiving just 0.4% of the vote. It lost its seat in the 1996 parliamentary elections.

The party did not nominate a presidential candidate again until the 2009 elections, in which Bienvenu Mauro Nguema ran on the MORENA–Unionist ticket. He received only 293 votes (0.09%).
