= Vincent Essone Mengue =

Gabonese politician

Vincent Essone Mengue (born 4 January 1946) is a Gabonese politician. He served in the government of Gabon as Minister of Small and Medium Sized Enterprises, the Social Economy, and the Fight Against Poverty from 2007 to 2009.

Born in Oyem, Essone Mengue was in charge of studies at the Commissariat of Planning and Development from 1978 to 1980. Subsequently, he was Adviser to the Minister of Agriculture, Water, and Forests from 1980 to 1983, Director-General of the Ministry of Small and Medium-Sized Enterprises from 1983 to 1990, and Director-General of the National Agency for the Promotion of Small and Medium-Sized Enterprise from 1990 to 1991. He became Administrator of the People's Bank in 1993.

As a member of the National Rally of Woodcutters - Rally for Gabon (RNB-RPG), Essone Mengue became Mayor of Oyem in 1996. After 11 years in that position, he was appointed to the government as Minister of Small and Medium-Sized Enterprises, the Social Economy, and the Fight Against Poverty on 28 December 2007.

Following the death of President Omar Bongo on 8 June 2009, Essone Mengue was dismissed from the government on 22 July 2009; this was thought to be related to his apparent support for Casimir Oyé Mba's independent candidacy in the 30 August 2009 presidential election. He was no longer a member of the RPG by that point.
