= Pierre Mamboundou =

Gabonese politician (1946–2011)

Pierre Mamboundou (6 November 1946 – 15 October 2011) was a Gabonese politician. He was President of the Union of the Gabonese People (UPG), an opposition party in Gabon, from 1989 to 2011.

== ACCT career and 1989 events ==
Mamboundou was born in Mouila. He headed the commercial agency of the Office of Posts and Telecommunications from 1978 to 1979, and he worked at the Agency of Cultural and Technical Cooperation (ACCT) from 1979 to 1989; he was the ACCT's Director of External Relations from 1985 to 1989 and was based in Paris. In Paris on 14 July 1989, he announced the foundation of the UPG, an opposition party. After being accused of organizing an October 1989 coup plot, he was convicted in absentia and sentenced to ten years in prison. He denied the accusation and said that the plot was an invention of the government. Mamboundou was also dismissed from his post at the ACCT in 1989.

== Exile and 1993 return to Gabon ==
President Omar Bongo said in January 1990 that Mamboundou was sending political leaflets opposing his government into Gabon. In France, where Mamboundou was living, Mamboundou's lawyer requested that he be designated as a political refugee by the French Office for the Protection of Refugees and Stateless Persons on 23 February 1990. He was nevertheless arrested at his home in Chelles, Seine-et-Marne on 28 February 1990 on the grounds that he was a threat to public order due to his activities, and he was flown to Senegal on the same day. On 18 October 1993, he announced his plans to return to Gabon within two days in order to stand as a candidate in the December 1993 presidential election. He subsequently returned to Gabon from Dakar on 31 October 1993, but he was unable to return before the end of the period for the submission of candidacies and therefore could not run in the presidential election. Despite his earlier in absentia conviction, which had not been lifted, he was not arrested upon his return.

== As an opposition leader in Gabon ==
Mamboundou was elected as Mayor of Ndendé in 1996, and he was also elected to the National Assembly in the December 1996 parliamentary election as a UPG candidate in Ngounié Province. During the parliamentary term that followed, he was President of the United Democratic Forces Parliamentary Group.

In the 6 December 1998 presidential election, Mamboundou ran as the candidate of the High Council of the Resistance (HCR), a coalition of opposition parties. However, shortly before the election, HCR representative Aloise Obame accused Mamboundou of ordering the purchase of guns in Congo-Brazzaville with the purpose of using them to destabilizing Gabon. Mamboundou denounced the claim as a "pack of lies" and described himself as Bongo's only credible opponent. In the election, he officially placed second behind Bongo, receiving 16.54% of the vote. He denounced the official results as an "electoral coup d'etat" and called on the people to begin a "graduated response" by engaging in a stay at home ("ghost city") protest. Following the election, he alleged that commandos sent by the government tried to kill him on 12 December 1998. While Mamboundou's call for people to stay at home was mostly ignored in Libreville, Port-Gentil was reportedly "paralysed".

The UPG chose to boycott the December 2001 parliamentary election, and consequently Mamboundou lost his seat in the National Assembly. He refused to participate in the government that was formed on 27 January 2002, in which two other opposition leaders—Paul M'ba Abessole and Pierre-Claver Maganga Moussavou—were included. Prior to the 29 December 2002 local elections, he denounced Bongo, the government, and the ruling Gabonese Democratic Party (PDG) as "a trio for the destruction of Gabon".

He ran again in the 27 November 2005 presidential election and finished second to Bongo, winning 13.6% of the vote. Unlike many other opposition leaders, Mamboundou had consistently refused to compromise with Bongo and the PDG, increasing his credibility among many Gabonese. Prior to the 2005 election, UPG Secretary-General Richard Moulomba claimed that Mamboundou was robbed of victory in 1998 and vowed that it would not happen again. The UPG said that opinion polls showed Mamboundou to be the most popular candidate, with Bongo trailing in third place. After official results were released showing Bongo with an overwhelming majority of the vote, Mamboundou and third place candidate Zacharie Myboto immediately denounced the results as fraudulent. He and Myboto both appealed the results to the Constitutional Court; in his appeal, Mamboundou argued that the composition of the Constitutional Court was unconstitutional and that the appeal should be judged only once that body had been "renewed". When the Court considered the appeals in early January 2006, its Commissioner for Law recommended the dismissal of Mamboundou's complaint; Mamboundou angrily declared that to be "shameful for the Republic" and walked out. Marie-Madeleine Mborantsuo, the President of the Constitutional Court, then accused Mamboundou of "public insults against judges" and "clear threats". Mamboundou's appeal was rejected by the Court, along with Myboto's.

=== 2006–2011 events ===
Searching for arms, security forces entered the UPG headquarters in Awendjé on 31 March 2006 and arrested 15 members of the party. (They were later released without charge.) Mamboundou then fled to the South African Embassy in Libreville. After leaving the embassy, he met with President Bongo on 19 April 2006; he described the meeting as historic and said that Bongo was open to dialogue. Although still an opposition leader, he subsequently faced criticism for his rapprochement with Bongo and the PDG regime; some argued that he had softened his opposition. By June 2007, he had met with Bongo five times. Bongo agreed to give him 11 billion CFA francs for the development of Ndendé.

As a representative of the opposition, Mamboundou was included on the joint majority–opposition commission on the reform of the electoral process, which began its work in May 2006 and included 12 representatives from the Presidential Majority and 12 from the opposition. In the December 2006 parliamentary election, Mamboundou was elected to the National Assembly as the UPG candidate in Ndendé constituency, located in the Dola Department of Ngounié Province. In the National Assembly, he became President of the UPG Parliamentary Group after the election. Under the Constitution he could not hold more than one elective office and therefore had to step down as Mayor of Ndendé in order to retain his seat in the National Assembly. Fidèle Mouloungui Moussavou, also from the UPG, was elected to succeed him as Mayor on 21 May 2007.

On 19 July 2009, following President Bongo's death on 8 June, Mamboundou was designated as the candidate of the Alliance for Change and Restoration opposition coalition for the 30 August 2009 presidential election. Aside from the UPG, this coalition included the National Alliance of Builders (ANB), the Union for the New Republic (UPRN), the National Rally of Woodcutters (RNB), and the Gabonese Socialist Party (PSG). Mamboundou declared that "Gabon needs another new way to govern".

During the electoral campaign, Mamboundou said on 20 August 2009 that Gabon did not need a Senate and that he would seek the abolition of the Senate through referendum if he were elected.

Still leading the UPG, Mamboundou died suddenly on 15 October 2011.
