= Jean-Félix Mouloungui =

Gabonese politician

Jean-Félix Mouloungui is a Gabonese politician who was appointed to the government of Gabon as Minister of Small and Medium-Sized Enterprises in October 2009.

== Life and career ==
Mouloungui, who was active as a businessman in France, was a member of the Union of the Gabonese People (UPG), a radical opposition party, and was the party's spokesman in Europe and the United States until October 2009. Following the August 2009 presidential election, UPG President Pierre Mamboundou, who claimed victory in the election, held a protest at the Electoral Commission building on 3 September 2009, and the police reacted with force; Mamboundou was reportedly injured. Mouloungui then claimed that the police actions "signified the beginning of civil war in Gabon". He also said that Mamboundou was in a "safe place", which he did not identify.

Although the UPG alleged that Ali Bongo Ondimba won the presidential election through fraud and refused to participate in any government under Bongo, Mouloungui was appointed to the government as Minister of Small and Medium-Sized Enterprises and the Craft Industry by President Bongo on 17 October 2009. By accepting the post, Mouloungui violated party discipline and was promptly expelled from the UPG on 19 October. Mouloungui, who returned to Gabon from Paris to take up his post, said that he "joined the government as a businessman and not as a member of a political party" and continued to express respect for Mamboundou.

Mouloungui announced on 8 March 2010 that he had joined Bongo's party, the Gabonese Democratic Party (PDG).
