= Rally of Republican Democrats =

Political party in Gabon

The Rally of Republican Democrats (French: Rassemblement des Démocrates Républicains, RDR) is a political party in Gabon headed by Léontine Mebale.

== History ==
The party won a single seat in National Assembly in the 2006 parliamentary elections, in which it was part of the bloc headed by the ruling Gabonese Democratic Party. The party lost its seat in the 2011 elections.
