= Mengue =

Mengue is a surname. Notable people with the surname include:

- Albert Mengue (born 1999), Cameroonian boxer
- Bruno Ondo Mengue (born 1992), Spanish-born Equatoguinean basketball player
- Ntyam Mengue (born 1954), Cameroonian jurist
- Vincent Essone Mengue (born 1946), Gabonese politician
