= Jean-Félix =

Jean-Félix is a given name of French origin. Notable people with the name include:

- Jean-Félix Acquaviva (born 1973), French politician
- Joseph-Jean-Felix Aubert (1849–1924), French painter
- Jean-Félix Dorothée (born 1981), French footballer
- Jean-Félix Adolphe Gambart (1800–1836), French astronomer
- Jean Félix Marie Guillaume of Luxembourg (born 1957), known as Prince Jean of Luxembourg
- Jean-Félix Krautheimer (1908–1943), French colonial administrator
- Jean-Félix Mamalepot (1940–2012), Gabonese banker
- Jean-Félix Mouloungui, Gabonese politician
- Jean-Félix Nourrisson (1825–1899), French philosopher
- Jean-Felix Picard or Jean Picard (1620–1682), French astronomer, priest and pioneer
- Jean Felix Piccard (1884–1963), Swiss-American chemist, engineer, professor, high-altitude balloonist
- Jean Félix-Tchicaya (1901–1963), Congolese politician in the French colony of Middle Congo
- Jean Félix Demba Telo, Congolese politician and presidential candidate
- Jean-Félix-Albert-Marie Vilnet (1922–2013), French prelate of the Roman Catholic Church
