= Congress for Democracy and Justice =

Political party in Gabon

The Congress for Democracy and Justice (French: Congrès pour la démocratie et la justice, CDJ) is a political party in Gabon, led by Jules-Aristide Bourdes-Ogouliguende.

== History ==
The party won a single seat in the 1996 parliamentary elections. It retained its seat in the elections in 2001 and 2006.

Bourdes-Ogouliguende ran for the presidency in the 2009 elections, finishing sixth out of eighteen candidates with 0.2% of the vote. In the 2011 parliamentary elections the party lost its one seat.
