= National Woodcutters' Rally – Rally for Gabon =

Political party in Gabon

The National Woodcutters Rally–Rally for Gabon (French: Rassemblement national des bûcherons–Rassemblement pour le Gabon, RNB–RPG) is a political party in Gabon.

== History ==
The party was established in 1990 as Movement for National Rectification–Woodcutters (Mouvement de redressement national–Bûcherons, MORENA–Bûcherons), a breakaway from the Movement for National Rectification. In the 1990 parliamentary elections it won 20 of the 120 seats in the National Assembly, becoming the largest opposition party. In February 1991 it was renamed "National Woodcutters Rally" (RNB).

The RNB nominated Paul Mba Abessole as its candidate for the 1993 presidential elections; he finished second with 26.5% of the vote. Although it won a majority of the contested seats in the 1996 local elections, the party was reduced to seven seats in the 1996 parliamentary elections. However, the following year Mba Abessole was elected mayor of Libreville, where the RNB had a majority on the municipal council.

In 1998 the party split, with a faction led by Pierre-André Kombila leaving to form the National Woodcutters' Rally – Democratic. In the presidential elections later in the year, Mba Abessole finished third with 13% of the vote and Kombila fourth with 1.5%.

In 2000 the party adopted the name "Rally for Gabon", but was referred to as National Woodcutters Rally–Rally for Gabon. In the 2001 parliamentary elections the party gained a seat, giving it a total of eight.

The RNB–RPG did not nominate a candidate for the 2005 presidential elections, and contested the 2006 parliamentary elections as part of the pro-PDG bloc, retaining its eight seats. Although Mba Abessole was selected as the party's candidate for the 2009 presidential elections, he later withdrew in favour of independent candidate André Mba Obame. The party was reduced to three seats in the 2011 parliamentary elections.

== Electoral history ==
=== Presidential elections ===
Election	Party candidate	Votes	%	Result
1993	Paul Mba Abessole	110,747	26.51%	Lost ✗
1998	Paul Mba Abessole	41,701	13.16%	Lost ✗
2005	Did not Participate			
2009	Supported André Mba Obame (Ind)	88,026	25.88%	Lost ✗
2016	Paul Mba Abessole	761	0.21%	Lost ✗

=== National Assembly elections ===
Election	Seats	+/–	Position	Result
1990	20 / 120	▲20	▲2nd	Opposition
1996	7 / 120	▼13	▼3rd	Opposition
2001	8 / 120	▲1	▲2nd	Opposition
2006	8 / 120	Steady	2nd	Opposition
2011	3 / 120	▼5	2nd	Opposition
2018	0 / 143	▼3	▼14th	Extra-parliamentary

=== Senate elections ===
Election	Seats	+/–	Position	Result
1997	19 / 92	▲19	▲2nd	Opposition
2003	8 / 92	▼11	2nd	Opposition
2009	6 / 102	▼2	2nd	Opposition
2014	0 / 100	▼2		Extra-parliamentary

== See also ==
- Vincent Essone Mengue
