= People's Unity Party (Gabon) =

Defunct political party in Gabon

The People's Unity Party (French: Parti de l'Unité du Peuple, PUP) was a political party in Gabon.

== History ==
The party was established by Louis-Gaston Mayila in 1991, and supported President Omar Bongo of the Gabonese Democratic Party in the 1993 presidential elections. It won one seat in the 2001 parliamentary elections.
