= Common Movement for Development =

Political party in Gabon

The Common Movement for Development (French: Mouvement Commun de Développement, MCD) was a political party in Gabon, led by Paul Biyoghé Mba.

== History ==
The party was established by Biyoghé Mba in 1994 after he left the ruling Gabonese Democratic Party (PDG).

In 1997 the party won a seat in the Senate, taken by Biyoghé Mba; and in 1999 he was appointed to the cabinet. In November 2002 the party merged into the PDG.
