= Independent Centre Party of Gabon =

Political party in Gabon

The Independent Centre Party of Gabon (French: Parti gabonais du centre indépendant, PGCI) is a political party in Gabon.

== History ==
Established in 1990, the party nominated Jean-Pierre Lemboumba-Lepandou as its candidate for the 1993 presidential elections. He finished ninth in a field of thirteen candidates with 1.4% of the vote. In the 1997 local elections the PGCI won 14 seats. In 2002 it joined the Presidential Majority, supporting the Gabonese Democratic Party. It won one seat in the Senate in the 2003 elections, and went on to win two seats in the 2009 elections.

The party nominated five candidates for the 2011 National Assembly elections, winning one seat. It was reduced to a single seat in the Senate in 2014 elections.
