= Rally for Democracy and Progress (Gabon) =

Political party in Gabon

The Rally for Democracy and Progress (French: Rassemblement pour la Démocratie et le Progrès, CRP) is a political party in Gabon.

== History ==
The party won one seat in the National Assembly in the 1996 parliamentary elections. The following year it won a seat in the Senate.

The party nominated six candidates for the 2011 National Assembly elections, but failed to win a seat.
