= Association for Socialism in Gabon =

Defunct political party in Gabon

The Association for Socialism in Gabon (French: Association pour le socialisme au Gabon, APSG) was a political party in Gabon.

== History ==
After the restoration of multi-party democracy, the party won six seats in the 1990 parliamentary elections. It supported President Omar Bongo of the Gabonese Democratic Party in the 1993 presidential elections.
