= African Development Movement =

Political party in Gabon

The African Development Movement (French: Mouvement Africain de Développement, MAD) was a political party in Gabon led by Pierre Claver Zeng Ebome.

MAD contested the 2001 parliamentary elections to win Zeng Ebome a seat in the National Assembly. He retained it in the 2006 elections, wherein MAD was part of a bloc supporting the ruling Gabonese Democratic Party. He lost it in the 2011 elections.

MAD held its Fourth Congress on 10 February 2008, reaffirming its participation in the Presidential Majority and reelecting Zeng Ebome as its president. In 2010, it was one of several parties that had merged into the National Union.
