= 2009 Gabonese presidential election =

- 30 August 2009
- Registered: 807,402
- Turnout: 44.29%
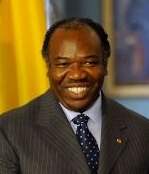
Nominee	Ali Bongo	André Mba Obame	Pierre Mamboundou
Party	PDG	Independent	UPG
Popular vote	141,952	88,026	85,597
Percentage	41.73%	25.88%	25.22%
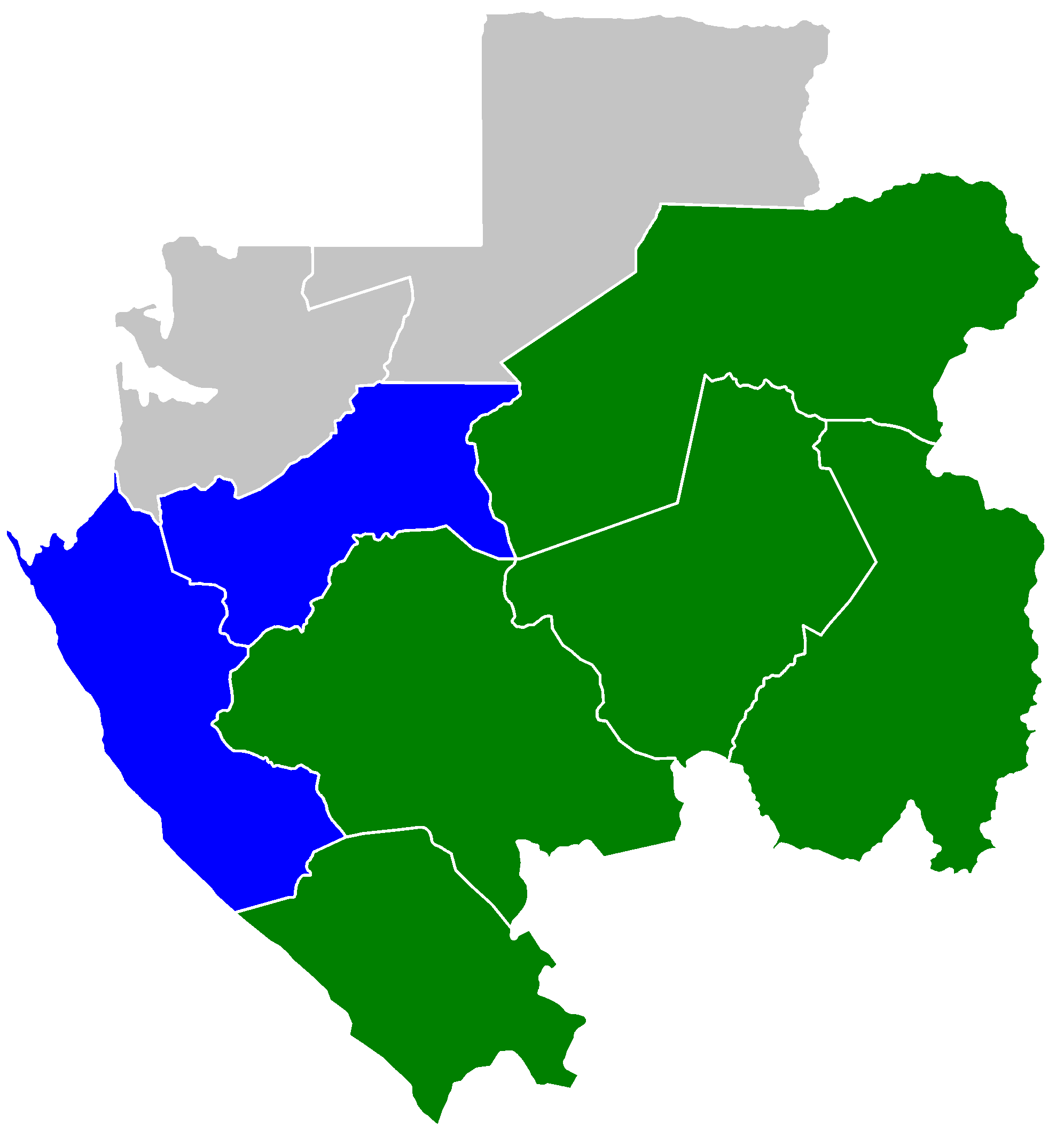
President before election
Rose Francine Rogombé (Acting)
PDG
Elected President
Ali Bongo Ondimba
PDG

Early presidential elections were held in Gabon on 30 August 2009. They took place due to the death of incumbent President Omar Bongo on 8 June, after more than 41 years as the sole president of Gabon. While the constitution stated that interim President Rose Francine Rogombé should organise elections within 30 to 45 days, the Constitutional Court accepted the government's request for a delay due to the circumstances.

A total of 23 candidates were approved to contest the elections, although six of them withdrew immediately before election day, reducing the field to 17 candidates. Despite the large number of candidates, three of them were considered the key contenders for the Presidency; Ali Bongo Ondimba, the son of Omar Bongo, who was the candidate of the long-ruling Gabonese Democratic Party (PDG); Pierre Mamboundou, a radical opposition leader who was backed by a coalition of parties; and André Mba Obame, a former PDG member who ran as an independent and won the backing of several other candidates.

According to official results announced on 3 September 2009, Bongo won the elections with a plurality of 41.7% of the vote, while Mba Obame and Mamboundou both trailed with about 25% each. Opposition supporters reacted violently to the results.

== Background ==
In the aftermath of Omar Bongo's death, reports suggested that, due to the need to update the voters' roll, the elections might not be held within the 45-day period. Rogombé said on 20 June that preparations for the elections would involve a "broad consultation with the active forces of the nation" and that her decisions would be made "under the triple seal of the constitution, consultations and consensus". In an interview on 22 June, Prime Minister Jean Eyeghé Ndong appeared to confirm this speculation, saying that "it seems certain that it will take us more than 45 days". Under the constitution, a delay beyond 45 days is legally permissible in a case of force majeure. Eyeghé Ndong also said in the same interview that he would consider standing as a presidential candidate if he felt he had the necessary support. The news agency Agence France-Presse reported that sources variously expected that elections could be held in September 2009, in the last quarter of 2009, or as late as 2010.

Rogombé held talks regarding the organization of the elections with leaders of the Presidential Majority coalition on 23 June, and then with opposition party leaders on 24 June. One of the key opposition leaders, Zacharie Myboto of the Gabonese Union for Democracy and Development (UGDD), said that he thought it was "physically impossible" to hold the elections within the constitutional 45-day timeframe and spoke of instead holding elections in five to six months. Also on 23 June, opposition leader Pierre Mamboundou alleged that a coup was being prepared and denounced it. The Defense Ministry denied the existence of coup plot, and some suspected Mamboundou made the allegation in hopes of encouraging a delay in the elections.

On 6 July, the government requested that the Constitutional Court delay the elections beyond the 45-day deadline, although it did not specify how long of a delay it wanted. The Court, observing that time had been needed to organize Bongo's funeral in June, ruled on 8 July that a delay was acceptable due to force majeure, but it said that the elections should still be held no later than 6 September.

UGDD President Myboto said in mid-July that he felt that the Constitutional Court's decision to allow a 45-day extension still did not allow enough time, but he also called for UGDD militants to register to vote.

It was reported on 15 July that the Autonomous and Permanent National Electoral Commission (CENAP) had proposed to the government that the elections be held on 30 August; candidates would submit their nominations from 17 July to 22 July, and campaigning would begin on 15 August. The government officially adopted those dates on 16 July.

After Eyeghé Ndong's resignation on 17 July, Rogombé promptly appointed Paul Biyoghé Mba, a PDG member who had been the Minister of Agriculture, as Prime Minister later on the same day.

The composition of Biyoghé Mba's government was announced on the evening of 22 July. It was composed of 44 members, slightly smaller than the previous government under Eyeghé Ndong. Six ministers were dismissed, including two party leaders (Mba Abessole and Pierre-André Kombila) and three presidential candidates (Mba Abessole, Oyé Mba, and Mba Obame). Kombila had chosen to support Mamboundou's candidacy. Two presidential candidates, Ali-Ben Bongo and Pierre-Claver Maganga Moussavou, were retained in their posts.

Laure Olga Gondjout, the Minister of Communication, defended the inclusion of two presidential candidates in the government, saying that there was no law against it. She said that Maganga Moussavou had been retained in the government as Minister of Technical Education because it was important for him to continue his work in the education sector while student exams took place. Mba Abessole criticized the two candidates' inclusion and called for them to leave the government. The UGDD expressed a similar sentiment, stating on 24 July that the inclusion of Bongo and Maganga Moussavou "calls into question the equal treatment of candidates and impartiality expected of the State during the election campaign". RNB President Kombila said that Biyoghé Mba was in office merely "to organize the victory of a candidate" and that he should resign along with his government; he also said that Rogombé should meet with the political class to discuss setting up a different structure to organize the elections.

On 27 July, eight candidates—Jules-Aristide Bourdes-Ogouliguende (the Congress for Democracy and Justice candidate), Mamboundou, Mba Abessole, Luc Bengono Nsi (the Movement for National Rectification candidate), Eyeghé Ndong, Mba Obame, Oyé Mba, and Anna Claudine Ayo Assayi—jointly called for the resignation of Bongo and Maganga Moussavou from the government. Bourdes-Ogouliguende, describing the situation as unacceptable, expressed particular concern about the power Bongo wielded as Minister of Defense, worrying that he could use that power to influence the outcome of the elections. PDG Secretary-General Boukoubi, echoing Gondjout's earlier statement, said on 29 July that the demands for the resignation of the two ministers were not based on any "legal premise".

Following the criticism, Maganga Moussavou said that he would resign from the government on 14 August, one day before the beginning of campaigning; he asked Bongo to do the same, concerned that Bongo's failure to do so could make opposition claims that he intended to use his post to give himself an advantage appear more credible. The Patriotic United Forces (FPU), an opposition group, announced on 29 July 2009 that it was supporting Oyé-Mba's candidacy. It described him as a "man of integrity, peace, and experience" and "the true candidate of consensus".

At its Fourth Extraordinary Congress, ADERE declined to endorse any candidate, with ADERE President Divungi Di Ndinge calling on party activists to vote according to their conscience at the conclusion of the congress on 2 August 2009. Also on 2 August, Eyeghé Ndong denied claims that he resigned to stand as an independent candidate because he was a "sore loser"; he said that in fact he did so "because it was time that I listened to my conscience".

Maganga Moussavou announced his resignation from the government on 6 August 2009.

On 7 August, violent demonstrations shook Libreville as protesters demanded that Bongo resign from the government; Gabonese authorities had previously banned the march, in which about 10,000 protesters reportedly participated. Protesters threw stones at police and police used tear gas against the protesters. Many presidential candidates were reportedly present at the march: Mamboundou, Mba Abessole, Myboto, Bourdes-Ogouliguende, Oyé Mba, Bengono Asi, Ayo Assayi, and Bruno Ben Moubamba.

Various candidates met with Interim President Rogombé in Libreville on 12 August to discuss issues related to the electoral process; Prime Minister Biyoghé Mba was also present at the meeting. At the meeting, candidates complained about problems in the electoral process, including the possibility that the electoral lists were unreliable. 11 candidates announced after the meeting that they wanted the elections to be delayed and would take the matter to the courts; according to one of the candidates, Bourdes-Ogouliguende, "in the current climate, the irregularities and disparities are too flagrant." Biyoghé Mba said that a delay was not necessary and that the electoral lists were being properly scrutinized; according to Biyoghé Mba, 120,000 duplicate names had been detected on the electoral lists by that point. Also on 12 August, Biyoghé Mba reiterated that no law required Bongo to resign from the government and that if Bongo decided his ministerial position was incompatible with his candidacy, then he would have to make an individual decision to resign.

On 14 August 2009, the former minister Jean Rémy Pendy Bouyiki, who was a member of the PDG Political Bureau, announced that he was leaving the PDG and creating a new party, the Democratic Party for Action and Freedom. The new party was part of the Presidential Majority, and Pendy Bouyiki planned for it to work to defend Ali-Ben Bongo and the PDG against the "very offensive" opposition.

== Candidates ==
The period for the submission of candidate applications ended on the evening of 22 July. By that time CENAP had reportedly received about 30 applications; this was higher than the number of people who had publicly announced intentions to run. The period for voter enrollment was also intended to conclude at the same time; it had been extended by 24 hours, but the UPG and the PSG opposition parties sought a further one-week extension to facilitate full enrollment of everyone who wanted to vote. On 23 July CENAP released the list of the 18 candidates allowed to run for president. Ayo Assayi, Eyeghé Ndong, Duboze Lasseni, Mba Abessole, and Mehdi Teale all withdrew in favor of André Mba Obame on 28 August, two days before the elections. Casimir Oyé-Mba withdrew on 30 August, the day of the elections, thereby reducing the list to 17 candidates.

=== PDG ===
Daniel Ona Ondo, the First Vice-President of the National Assembly, said on Radio France International on 25 June that he intended to seek the PDG's nomination as its presidential candidate. He was the first person to confirm that he intended to seek the ruling party's nomination, although Eyeghé Ndong and long-time minister Casimir Oyé-Mba had previously signalled that they might do so. Although Ona Ondo said that he intended to only run if he won the PDG nomination, it was noted that he made the announcement publicly without adhering to party guidelines intended to ensure unity and discipline. Eyeghé Ndong had already expressed concerns that Bongo's death could lead to a dangerous weakening of party unity if PDG members announced their candidacies without internal party consultations. The Regional Director of Health in the north, Sany Megwazeb, also stated early on that he would seek the PDG nomination.

The deadline for applications for the PDG's nomination was midnight on 4 July. The PDG subsequently announced that ten individuals had applied for the party's presidential nomination. The four key contenders for the nomination were Bongo's son, Ali-Ben Bongo, who was Minister of Defense and a Vice-President of the PDG, Prime Minister Eyeghé Ndong, who was also a Vice-President of the PDG, Casimir Oyé-Mba, who was Minister of State for Mines and Oil and a member of the PDG Political Bureau, and Daniel Ona Ondo, who was First Vice-President of the National Assembly. The other candidates for the nomination were former minister Christiane Bitougah, gynecologist Stéphane Iloko Boussiégui, journalist Thiery Kombila d'Argendieu, National Assembly Deputy Santurel Mandoungou, banker Christian Raphael Gondjout, and Regional Director of Health Sany Megwazeb.

Nine of the ten contenders for the PDG nomination were present for hearings before the Standing Committee of the PDG Political Bureau on 6 July; Christian Raphael Gondjout was absent. PDG Secretary-General Faustin Boukoubi announced on 7 July that the party's chosen candidate would not be made known on 8 July as previously planned; this was due to Gondjout's absence and the fact that the 30-day mourning period for Bongo ended on that date.

Bongo was officially designated as the PDG candidate at an extraordinary party congress on 19 July. Stressing the importance of national unity, he vowed to battle corruption and "redistribute the proceeds of economic growth". PDG Secretary-General Boukoubi described Bongo as the "most dynamic candidate, one who is the most likely to make the necessary changes."

PDG Deputy Secretary-General Angel Ondo announced on 16 July that the party leadership had chosen Ali-Ben Bongo by consensus as the PDG candidate, although this decision still needed to be formally confirmed at a party congress.

=== Other parties ===
The Rally for Gabon (RPG), which was part of the Presidential Majority coalition (and formerly an opposition party), held its 11th Extraordinary Congress in Libreville on 12 July 2009 and unanimously chose its President, Deputy Prime Minister Paul Mba Abessole, as its candidate. He was immediately backed by three other parties: the Movement for National Rectification (MORENA) and the National Rally of Woodcutters (RNB), both part of the Presidential Majority, and the Party of Equal Opportunity (PEC), an opposition party. The RPG stressed that it had no intentions of leaving the Presidential Majority, but also that Mba Abessole would not withdraw in favor of the PDG candidate prior to the elections. On 12 July, another Presidential Majority party, the Social Democratic Party (PSD), nominated its leader, the government minister Pierre-Claver Maganga Moussavou, as its candidate for the election.

On 19 July, opposition leader Pierre Mamboundou—who placed second in the 1998 presidential elections and the 2005 presidential elections—was designated as the candidate of the Alliance for Change and Restoration coalition. Aside from Mamboundou's own party, the Union of the Gabonese People (UPG), this coalition included the National Alliance of Builders (ANB), the Union for the New Republic (UPRN), the National Rally of Woodcutters (RNB), and the Gabonese Socialist Party (PSG).

UGDD President Myboto announced on 20 July that he would stand as a candidate "for a transition" and that he intended to serve only one term if elected. Didjob Divungi Di Ndinge, the Vice-President of Gabon and the President of the Democratic and Republican Alliance (ADERE), said on 21 July that he would not be a candidate.

=== Independents ===
Former PDG Senator Victoire Lasseni Duboze announced on 7 July that she would stand as an independent candidate.

Having failed to win the PDG nomination, Eyeghé Ndong announced on 17 July that he was resigning as Prime Minister and would stand as an independent candidate. Eyeghé Ndong said that he made his decision because there had not truly been a consensus in favor of Bongo, and that therefore the proper procedure was not respected.

On 17 July, Andre Mba Obame, the Minister of Government Coordination, announced in Barcelona that he would stand as a presidential candidate. According to Mba Obame, he was ready to be President "after twenty-five years of learning and working closely alongside the late President Omar Bongo".

Casimir Oyé-Mba—who had failed in his bid to win the PDG nomination—announced on 21 July that he would stand as an independent candidate; he questioned the circumstances of Bongo's selection and said that he wanted to be "the true candidate of consensus".

=== Rejected candidates ===
CENAP received 28 applications in total, but it rejected five of them (all independent candidates: Ela Martin Edzodzomo, Daniel Mengara, Ignace Totapen Myogo, Arlette Ngombomoye, and Joseph Nkorouna) upon examination on 23 July; all of the rejections were either partially or wholly related to non-payment of the bond necessary to stand in the elections.

== Campaign ==
In a message to the nation on 14 August, immediately prior to the beginning of the campaign period, Rogombé urged calm and called for the candidates to be "worthy" of the votes they would receive. She also said that the two candidates still serving in the government would be replaced so that all candidates would be on an equal footing for the elections, thereby fulfilling a key opposition demand. In a minor reshuffle of the government on 15 August, Biyoghé Mba announced that Interior Minister Jean-François Ndongou was taking over from Bongo as Minister of Defense in an interim capacity, while the Minister of Urban and Regional Planning and the Craft Industry, Norbert Diramba, was taking over from Maganga Moussavou as Minister of Technical Education in an interim capacity.

The Alliance for Change and Restoration opposition coalition, which had nominated Mamboundou as its candidate, declared at the beginning of its campaign that other candidates were welcome to join the coalition and that it was not too late. On 15 August, four minor candidates—Mauro Nguema, Jean Ntoutoume Ngoua, Claudine Ayo Assayi, and Marcel Ntchoreret—announced that they would be willing to withdraw in favor of a single opposition candidate. Meanwhile, the independent candidate Bruno Ben Moubamba started a hunger strike to demand that the elections be postponed.

Mamboundou said on 20 August that Gabon did not need a Senate and that he would seek the abolition of the Senate through referendum if he were elected. Speaking in Port-Gentil on 21 August, Bongo condemned criticism of his father's presidency, saying that the critics had lived well for years under his father, but after his death they claimed "with Bongo I had nothing, I didn't eat, there was nothing..." He thus alleged that the critics were "ungrateful ... traitors" who were "telling lots of lies".

Continuing in his hunger strike in front of the National Assembly to press his demands for the resignation of the government and a delay in the elections, Moubamba's condition had sufficiently deteriorated by 22 August that he fainted and was involuntarily hospitalized by his campaign workers.

In an interview with Radio France Internationale on 24 August 2009, Myboto reiterated his "solemn commitment" to serving only one term of seven years if he won the elections; he said that he would use that time to "put Gabon on track" and then "pass the baton" to a "properly elected and credible" successor. Pointing to his resignation from the government in 2001, he stressed that in order to discourage the tendency of politicians to try to remain in office "forever", it was necessary to lead by example. Myboto also said that he would reform the constitution to restore the presidential two-term limit and "end the life presidency in Gabon". In the same interview, Myboto expressed grave doubts about the fairness of the elections, saying that the electoral list was seriously inflated and fraudulent; nevertheless, he said it was still worthwhile to participate in the elections so as to do "everything possible" to prevent "monarchy".

During campaigning, the major candidates, including Bongo and the key opposition candidates, tended to stress the importance of better management of the country's wealth, including wealth redistribution. Oyé-Mba criticized the uneven distribution of wealth in Gabon: "60 percent of Gabonese live below the vital minimum income threshold ... and only two percent of the population really benefits from the wealth of our country". Eyeghé Ndong sharply criticized "the Bongo system", declaring that the people wanted "new governance" and an end to the "embezzling of public funds and illicit enrichment". Nevertheless, despite widespread criticism of the way Omar Bongo had maintained support through handouts of money, it was observed that this practice was deeply ingrained in Gabonese society, and some believed it would be a difficult habit to break.

Agence France-Presse described Bongo as "the overwhelming favorite" because he was the candidate of the most powerful and established political party in Gabon and because he had massive campaign resources at his disposal. During the campaign, his image was described as ubiquitous in Libreville. The opposition adopted the slogan "anyone but Ali". On 25 August 2009, Eyeghé Ndong called for the opposition candidates to join together in support of a single candidate to face Bongo. The opposition candidates gathered for negotiations at a meeting chaired by Eyeghé Ndong and held a secret ballot to choose a joint candidate. The vote concluded early on 28 August and André Mba Obame was declared the victor. A statement was then sent to the press announcing that 11 candidates were withdrawing from the elections and rallying behind Mba Obame's candidacy. However, several of the candidates—Oyé-Mba, Bourdes-Ogouliguende, Victoire Lasseni Duboze, and Ben Moubamba—promptly denied this, saying that they were still running and did not support Mba Obame.

After a brief period of confusion, five candidates publicly rallied behind Mba Obame, withdrawing their own candidacies: Mba Abessole, Eyeghé Ndong, Mehdi Teale, Claudine Ayo Assayi, and Jean Ntoutoume Ngoua. Praising the withdrawing candidates, Mba Obame called them a "dream team" and declared that with their support he could not lose. A representative of Eyeghé Ndong said that the withdrawing candidates were putting the call of the people ahead of their own egos. Gondjout, the Minister of Communication, initially said that the withdrawing candidates would have to remain on the ballot, but CENAP subsequently said that their names would be removed. Meanwhile, speaking to the press at his last campaign rally, Bongo expressed confidence and satisfaction.

== Conduct ==
Voting on 30 August proceeded in a generally peaceful atmosphere with high voter turnout. Some isolated violence was reported. Oyé-Mba withdrew his candidacy on election day, citing his concerns about the possibility of violence.

== Results ==
Following the vote on 30 August, Mamboundou's campaign promptly declared that he was "ahead by a long way", holding the lead in eight of Gabon's nine provinces; Mamboundou discussed his economic plans as if victory were a foregone conclusion. Mba Obame was also quick to predict his own victory, saying that "it will take a miracle to stop us"; he claimed to have the lead in four provinces, while saying that Mamboundou was ahead in three provinces and Bongo was ahead in two. Mba Obame's television channel, TV+, was prevented from broadcasting; the opposition alleged that this was done for political reasons. Mamboundou claimed to have won the elections with 39.13% of the vote (as the elections were to be decided on a first past the post basis, a plurality was sufficient for victory), while Mba Obame claimed to have won a simple majority, 50.1%.

Bongo, speaking on 31 August, then announced that "information received from various constituencies across Gabon and abroad make me easily the winner"; he dismissed the other candidates' claims, saying that it was predictable that they would claim victory. He also said that he hoped to meet his target of obtaining 50% of the votes, while PDG Secretary-General Boukoubi predicted "a victory, a big victory". Also on 31 August, Myboto claimed that in 75% of the country the people had "voted overwhelmingly for change", and he called on state institutions, including CENAP and the Constitutional Court, to "respect the Constitution and the will of the people".

Réné Aboghé Ella, the President of CENAP, said on 31 August that official results might not be announced until 2 September. He also criticized the candidates for prematurely declaring victory. Both Mamboundou and Mba Obame expressed concern that CENAP and the Interior Ministry could produce fraudulent results in Bongo's favor. Mamboundou supporters gathered at the UPG headquarters in Awendje, Libreville, determined to protect the party's polling station reports, while Mba Obame supporters similarly gathered around his home. Late on 2 September, Mamboundou denounced the conduct of the elections; "It's not just a possibility of fraud. It's fraud pure and simple. The Gabonese people do not want a dynasty. Forty-two years of President Bongo is enough."

Official results announced by Interior Minister Ndongou on 3 September 2009 gave Bongo 41.7%, Mba Obame 25.8% and Mamboundou 25.2%. This announcement sparked immediate unrest; the French consulate in Port-Gentil was burned, and offices belonging to the French oil industry companies Total and Schlumberger were also attacked by angry protesters, as was a prison. Much of the protesters' anger was directed at France due to that country's historically warm relationship with the Bongo regime and a belief that it had assisted in rigging the elections; chants of "death to the whites" were reported, and the French government said that French citizens living in Gabon should stay indoors. The results announced by Ndongou were promptly confirmed by the Constitutional Court on 4 September and Bongo was designated as President-elect with 41.73% of the vote. Turnout was officially placed at 44.24%. Only Bongo, Mba Obame, and Mamboundou won significant shares of the vote; with the exception of Zacharie Myboto, who placed fourth with 3.94%, all of the other candidates received less than 1% each. On 4 September, 17 candidates—every candidate except Ali Bongo—presented a united front by issuing a joint statement denouncing the election results.

The Constitutional Court announced the results of the recount on 12 October 2009. It again declared Ali Bongo the winner, although the percentages of votes changed slightly as a result of the recount: Bongo was credited with 41.79% of the vote, a slight increase, while Mamboundou moved up to second place with 25.64% and Mba Obame fell to third place with 25.33%. Boukoubi expressed "full satisfaction", saying that "right and the law have prevailed" and that Bongo would "get down to all the problems of the Gabonese people and make Gabon into an emerging country". Yvette Rekangalt, a minor opposition candidate, dismissed the ruling, saying that the Constitutional Court was "like the Leaning Tower of Pisa—always tilted in one direction." Eyeghé Ndong, speaking on behalf of an opposition coalition that included four of the candidates, denounced the recount results and declared that no one would believe that the Court made its decision in good faith. He urged "the Gabonese people to fight injustice and other moves aimed at muzzling democracy and undermining its sovereignty", although he did not specify what form that resistance should take. Furthermore, he requested the assistance of "the African Union and other international institutions to revive a terminally ailing Gabon".

Candidate	Party	Votes	%
Ali Bongo Ondimba	Gabonese Democratic Party	141,952	41.73
André Mba Obame	Independent	88,026	25.88
Pierre Mamboundou	Union of the Gabonese People	85,797	25.22
Zacharie Myboto	Gabonese Union for Democracy and Development	13,418	3.94
Casimir Oyé-Mba (Note: Withdrew on election day.)	Independent	3,118	0.92
Pierre Claver Maganga Moussavou	Social Democratic Party	2,576	0.76
Bruno Ben Moubamba	Independent	963	0.28
Bruno Ngoussi Georges	Independent	915	0.27
Jules-Aristide Bourdes-Ogouliguende	Congress for Democracy and Justice	695	0.20
Albert Ondo Ossa	Independent	674	0.20
Yvette Ngwevilo Rekangalt	Independent	367	0.11
Ernest Tomo	Independent	308	0.09
Victoire Lasseni Duboze	Independent	304	0.09
Bienvenu Mauro Nguema	MORENA–Unionist	293	0.09
Luc Bengono Nsi	Movement for National Rectification	250	0.07
Marcel Robert Tchoreret	Omega Circle	248	0.07
Jean-Guy Kombeny	Independent	152	0.04
Bernard Oyama	Independent	106	0.03
Total		340,162	100.00
Valid votes		340,162	95.12
Invalid/blank votes		17,443	4.88
Total votes		357,605	100.00
Registered voters/turnout		807,402	44.29
Source: African Elections Database

== Aftermath ==
Despite a curfew imposed by the government, violence and looting continued in Port-Gentil in the days after the announcement of results. By 5 September, two people were reported killed there and Total evacuated most of its foreign employees to Libreville. Also on 5 September, Bongo attended a Cameroon–Gabon football match at the Omar Bongo Stadium in Libreville and then spoke to Radio France Internationale, stressing the importance of calm and saying that his opponents should pursue legal avenues if they had complaints. Meanwhile, Mba Obame and Myboto emerged from hiding to attend an opposition meeting, although Mamboundou did not. According to Mamboundou ally Louis-Gaston Mayila, Mamboundou suffered an arm injury at a demonstration in Libreville, during which the police fired tear gas, and then went into hiding. Communications Minister Gondjout said that Mamboundou was unharmed, however. Although protesters burned cars and set up barricades in Libreville, security forces were in clear control of the streets by the end of the day. Additional violence was reported in Nkembo, located east of Libreville. Meanwhile, Gabonese students in Dakar set fire to Gabon's embassy in Senegal.

In mid-September, opposition leaders called for the people to stay home and observe a three-day general strike, while Interim President Rogombé urged the people to ignore the opposition leaders and continue with their lives as normal. The strike was largely ignored and business proceeded as usual in Libreville and Port-Gentil. The French news agency AFP reported that people—even those who were supportive of the opposition—appeared unwilling to participate in the strike due to personal economic concerns.

11 requests for the results to be annulled were received by the Constitutional Court, and on 26 September 2009 it was announced that the Constitutional Court would conduct a recount beginning on 29 September by reviewing each polling station's official report. According to Constitutional Court President Marie-Madeleine Mborantsuo, it would do so "in the presence of bailiffs appointed by the plaintiffs". Boukoubi, the PDG Secretary-General, maintained that "the election took place openly" and that "whether you recount once or 100 times, it doesn't change the results". Mborantsuo said that each party would have one representative who would act as both its envoy and its bailiff, but the opposition parties objected, saying that they wanted two representatives each, and boycotted the recount as a result. Since opposition representatives would not be present, the PDG was also barred by the Constitutional Court from having a representative, and the recount began on 30 September. It was announced on 3 October that there would be no preliminary results from the recount and that the outcome would therefore not be publicized until final results were released, which was expected to occur in mid-October.

Bongo said that he was and would "always be the president of all the people of Gabon... I am and I will always be at the service of all, without exclusion". Mba Obame continued to claim victory and denounced the results as "an electoral coup d'état". He was sworn in as President at a ceremony on 16 October; various African presidents were present for the occasion. Bongo expressed a commitment to justice and the fight against corruption at the ceremony and said that fast action was needed to "give back confidence and promote the emergence of new hope". He also alluded to his father's governing philosophy of preserving stability through regional, tribal, and political balance in the allocation of power, while also stressing that "excellence, competence and work" were even more important than "geographical and political considerations". Later in the day, he announced the reappointment of Biyoghé Mba as Prime Minister; he made the announcement personally "to underline the importance of this moment". According to Bongo, Biyoghé Mba had the necessary experience and managerial competence "to lead us through the next stage", and he said work would start "immediately".

The composition of Biyoghé Mba's new government was announced on 17 October; it was reduced to only 30 ministers, thus fulfilling Bongo's campaign promise to reduce the size of the government and thereby reduce expenses. The government was also mostly composed of new faces, including many technocrats, although a few key ministers, such as Paul Toungui (Foreign Minister), Jean-François Ndongou (Interior Minister), and Laure Olga Gondjout (Communications Minister), retained their posts.
