= Casimir Oyé-Mba =

Gabonese politician (1942–2021)

3rd Prime Minister of Gabon
- In office 3 May 1990 – 2 November 1994
- President: Omar Bongo
- Preceded by: Léon Mébiame
- Succeeded by: Paulin Obame-Nguema

Personal details
- Born: Casimir Marie Ange Oyé-Mba; 20 April 1942 Nzamaligué, French Equatorial Africa (present day Gabon)
- Died: 16 September 2021 (aged 79) Paris, France
- Party: National Union (since 10 February 2010)
- Other political affiliations: Gabonese Democratic Party (1973–2009); Gabonese Union for Democracy and Development (8–10 February 2010)

Casimir Marie Ange Oyé-Mba (20 April 1942 – 16 September 2021) was a Gabonese politician. After serving as Governor of the Bank of Central African States (BEAC) from 1978 to 1990, Oyé-Mba was Prime Minister of Gabon from 3 May 1990 to 2 November 1994. Subsequently, he remained in the government as Minister of State for Foreign Affairs from 1994 to 1999, Minister of State for Planning from 1999 to 2007, and Minister of State for Mines and Oil from 2007 to 2009.

== Early life and financial career ==
A member of the Fang ethnic group, Casimir Oyé-Mba was born in Nzamaligué, located in the Komo-Mondah Department of Estuaire Province.

After completing his secondary education (baccalauréat) in Gabon, Oyé-Mba went to France for higher education. He first completed a bachelor's degree (licence) in Law and Political Science at the University of Rennes. Next, he obtained a Diploma of Specialized Studies (DESS) at the Faculty of Law of Paris, and defended his doctorate thesis at the same institution in 1969. His thesis topic was the legal problems posed by the exploitation of subsoil in Gabon. He finished his studies by taking a degree in finance at the Center for Economic and Banking Studies (CEFEB), the school of the French Development Agency.

Oyé-Mba joined the Central Bank of the States of Equatorial Africa and Cameroon (BCEAEC) in January 1968; in January 1970, he became deputy director of its agency in Libreville, Gabon, and in April 1970 he became director of the Libreville agency. In 1973, when the BCEAEC became the Bank of Central African States (BEAC), Oyé-Mba became its National Director for Gabon, and in January 1977 he became Assistant Director-General of BEAC at its headquarters in Yaoundé, Cameroon. In April 1978, he became Governor of BEAC, remaining in this post until 1990.

== Political career ==
Following the 1990 National Conference in Gabon, Oyé-Mba was appointed Prime Minister of Gabon on 27 April 1990. In the parliamentary election held later in 1990, he won a seat in the National Assembly from Komo-Mondah Department in Estuaire Province, and following the election he was retained as prime minister in November 1990. In the December 1993 presidential election, which was won by incumbent President Omar Bongo, Oyé-Mba was Bongo's campaign manager; after the election, he resigned on 11 March 1994, but Bongo reappointed him on 13 March, and a new government headed by Oyé-Mba was named on 25 March. Following the signing of an agreement with the opposition later that year, Oyé-Mba and his government resigned on 11 October 1994 and were replaced by a new coalition government headed by Paulin Obame-Nguema on 2 November. Oyé-Mba was included in Obame-Nguema's government as Minister of State for Foreign Affairs and Cooperation, and he served in that position until he was moved to the post of Minister of State for Planning, Development Programming and Regional Planning in the government of Prime Minister Jean-François Ntoutoume Emane on 25 January 1999.

He was re-elected to the National Assembly in the December 1996 parliamentary election and in the December 2001 parliamentary election. In the December 2002 municipal elections, he was elected as a member of the city council in Ntoum.

Oyé-Mba was an unsuccessful candidate for the position of President of the African Development Bank in 2005; he reached the fourth round of voting on the first day of the election, 18 May 2005.

In the December 2006 parliamentary election, Oyé-Mba again won a seat in the National Assembly as the PDG candidate in Ntoum constituency; he retained his position in the government after that election. Later, after nearly nine years as Minister of State for Planning, Oyé-Mba was moved to the position of Minister of State for Mines, Petroleum, Oil, Energy, Water Resources and the Promotion of New Energies in the government that was named on 28 December 2007.

=== 2009 presidential candidacy ===
Following the death of President Bongo on 8 June 2009, Oyé-Mba—a member of the PDG Political Bureau—was one of ten PDG members who submitted applications to stand as the party's candidate in the early presidential election scheduled for 30 August 2009. Although he was considered one of the leading contenders, in mid-July 2009 Bongo's son Ali Bongo Ondimba was chosen as the PDG candidate instead. Having failed to obtain the nomination, Oyé-Mba announced that he would instead run as an independent presidential candidate on 21 July; he questioned the circumstances of Bongo's selection and said that he wanted to be "the true candidate of consensus". He was then excluded from the government that was appointed on 22 July 2009, after 19 years of continuous service.

The Patriotic United Forces (FPU), an opposition group, announced on 29 July 2009 that it was supporting Oyé-Mba's candidacy. It described him as a "man of integrity, peace, and experience" and "the true candidate of consensus". Speaking in Libreville on 9 August, Oyé-Mba said that he would focus on fighting youth unemployment if he was elected and he said that "if young people no longer trust politicians, it is because of a sense that they have often been betrayed".

During campaigning for the election, Oyé-Mba criticized the uneven distribution of wealth in Gabon: "60 percent of Gabonese live below the vital minimum income threshold ... and only two percent of the population really benefits from the wealth of our country". He stressed the importance of improving governance. During his campaign, which stressed his long experience, Oyé-Mba also called for more road construction (100 kilometers per year), saving money by reducing the number of ministers in the government, and reinstating the two-term limit on the Presidency.

Oyé-Mba withdrew his candidacy on election day, citing his concerns about the possibility of violence. Despite his withdrawal, he placed fifth, with 0.92% of the vote, according to results released by the Constitutional Court on 4 September 2009.

=== Opposition politics ===
On 30 December 2009, the planned creation of a new, united opposition party was announced, and Oyé-Mba was among the various opposition leaders participating in it. Oyé-Mba then joined the Gabonese Union for Democracy and Development (UGDD), an opposition party led by Zacharie Myboto, and the UGDD merged with two other parties to create a unified opposition party, the National Union. At the party's launch on 10 February 2010, Oyé-Mba was designated as one of its five vice-presidents. For the next presidential elections in 2016, Oyé-Mba declared his candidacy on the National Union ticket. He finally withdrew a fortnight before the election and endorsed Jean Ping. Oyé-Mba and other opposition leaders were banned from foreign travel during the post-election upheaval.

Oyé-Mba publicly cautioned against hastily dismantling the CFA franc, arguing that the currency union had helped its member countries control inflation.

== Illness and death ==
Oyé-Mba contracted COVID-19 in September 2021, and was hospitalized for one week in Libreville; he was airlifted to Paris on 11 September for further treatment. He died on 16 September at the Saint Joseph Hospital. Ali Bongo Ondimba and Jean Ping posted tributes to Oyé-Mba on their Facebook pages.

Preceded by Jean Ping	Foreign Minister of Gabon; 1994–1999	Succeeded by Jean Ping
