= Democratic and Republican Alliance =

Political party in Gabon

The Democratic and Republican Alliance (French: Alliance démocratique et républicaine, ADERE) is a political party in Gabon.

== History ==
The party won a single seat in the 1996 parliamentary elections. It gained two more seats in the 2001 elections and retained all three seats in the 2006 elections, in which it was part of the bloc led by the ruling Gabonese Democratic Party.

At a plenary session on 15 January 2010, ADERE decided to rejoin the Presidential Majority, which it had left in mid-2009, while expressing support for the reforms instituted by President Ali Bongo since taking office. The party lost all three seats in the 2011 elections.

ADERE President Dieudonné Pambou died on 24 January 2014.
