= 2006 Gabonese parliamentary election =

- 17 December 2006
- All 120 seats in the National Assembly; 61 seats needed for a majority
Party	Leader	Seats	+/–
PDG	Omar Bongo	82	−4
RNB–RPG	Paul Mba Abessole	8	0
UPG	Pierre Mamboundou	8	+8
UGDD	Zacharie Myboto	4	New
ADERE		3	0
CLR	Jean-Boniface Assélé	2	0
PGP		2	−1
PSD	Pierre Claver Maganga Moussavou	2	+1
MAD	Pierre-Claver Zeng Ebome	1	0
FAR	Léon Mbou Yembi	1	+1
CDJ	Jules-Aristide Bourdes-Ogouliguende	1	0
RNB–D	Pierre-André Kombila	1	0
RDR		1	New
Independents	–	4	−8
This lists parties that won seats. See the complete results below.

Parliamentary elections were held in Gabon on 17 December 2006, although voting in seven seats took places on 24 December 2006 due to logistical problems. The ruling Gabonese Democratic Party (PDG) won 82 seats, with other parties that supported President Omar Bongo winning another seventeen seats, among them the National Woodcutters' Rally of Paul M'ba Abessole with seven seats (M'ba Abessole himself lost his seat, being defeated by the prime minister, Jean Eyeghe Ndong), the Democratic and Republican Alliance with three seats, the Circle of Reformist Liberals with two seats and the Social Democratic Party with one seat.

Opposition parties won seventeen seats; the Union of the Gabonese People won eight seats, the Gabonese Union for Democracy and Development four, the Gabonese Progress Party two seats, the Congress for Democracy and Justice one seat, the African Forum for Reconstruction one seat and the National Woodcutters Rally-Kombila one seat.

Independents won four seats.

== Results ==
The National Woodcutters' Rally – Rally for Gabon, Democratic and Republican Alliance, Circle of Liberal Reformers, Social Democratic Party, African Development Movement and Rally of Republican Democrats were all supportive of the PDG.

Party	Seats	+/–
Gabonese Democratic Party	82	–4
National Woodcutters' Rally – Rally for Gabon	8	0
Union of the Gabonese People	8	+8
Gabonese Union for Democracy and Development	4	New
Democratic and Republican Alliance	3	0
Circle of Liberal Reformers	2	0
Gabonese Progress Party	2	–1
Social Democratic Party	2	+1
African Development Movement	1	0
African Forum for Reconstruction	1	+1
Congress for Democracy and Justice	1	0
National Woodcutters' Rally – Democratic	1	0
Rally of Republican Democrats	1	New
Independents	4	–8
Total	120	0
Source: African Elections Database

== Aftermath ==
In 20 constituencies, the results were annulled by the Constitutional Court because of problems with fraud and logistics, and the election was held again in these constituencies on 10 June 2007. Turnout was reported to be low. The PDG won in 11 of these constituencies, with its allies winning a further six, the opposition winning two and an independent winning one.
