= 1993 Gabonese presidential election =

- 5 December 1993
- Turnout: 88.08%
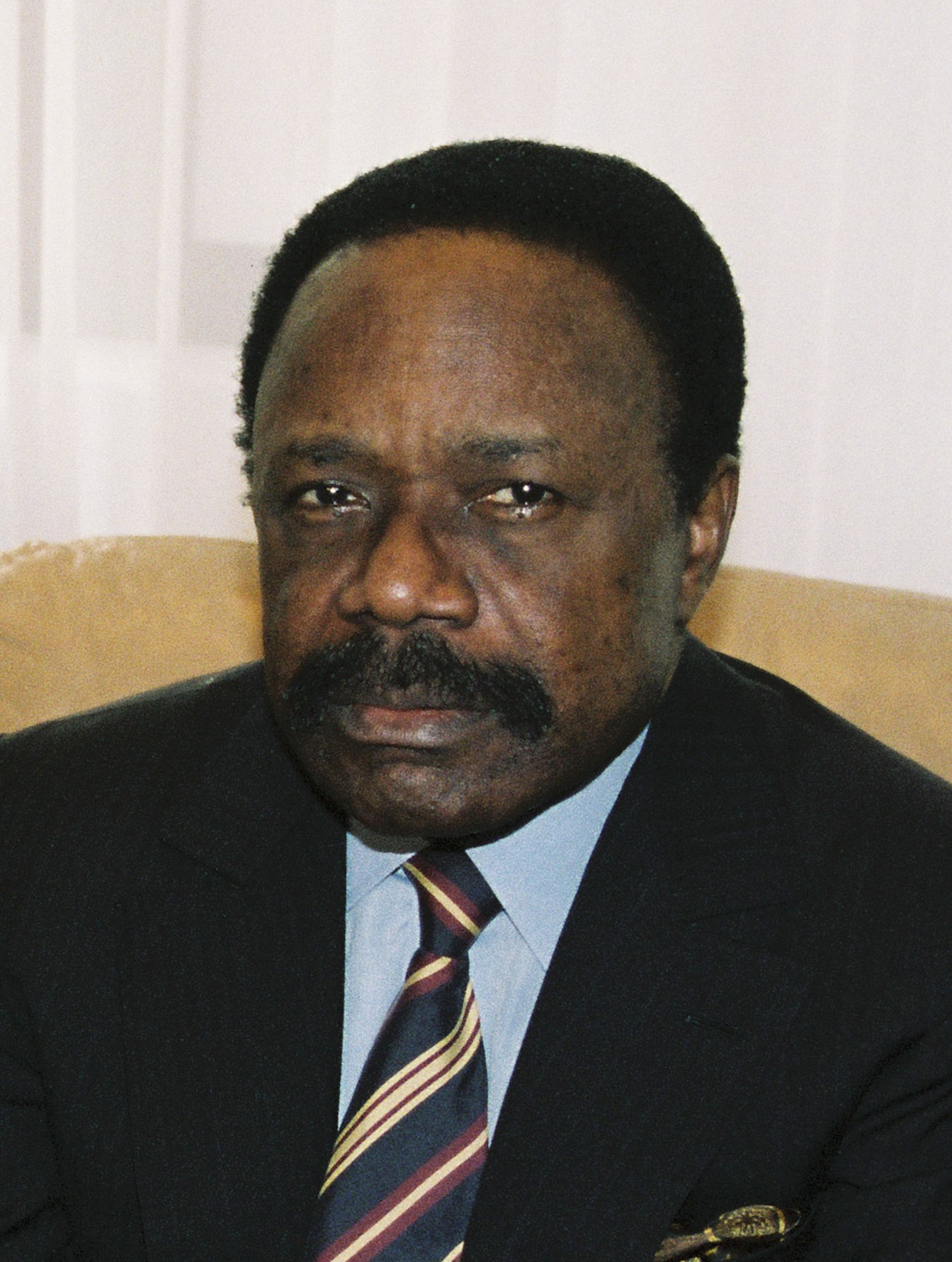

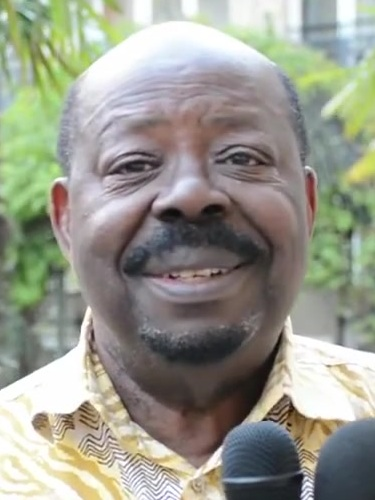
Candidate	Omar Bongo	Paul Mba Abessole
Party	PDG	RNB
Popular vote	213,793	110,747
Percentage	51.18%	26.51%
President before election
Omar Bongo
PDG
Elected President
Omar Bongo
PDG

Presidential elections were held in Gabon on 5 December 1993, the first time more than one candidate had contested a presidential election in the country. Incumbent President Omar Bongo, in power since 1967, sought a five-year term against twelve other candidates. According to official results Bongo won in the first round with 51.2% of the vote. However, the main opposition leader, Paul Mba Abessole, alleged fraud, claimed victory, and threatened to form a rival government. Riots in 1994 practically brought the country to a standstill until Bongo agreed to attend a peace conference with opposition groups in September 1994, in which a coalition government was formed until the 1996 parliamentary election, which Bongo's Gabonese Democratic Party won by a landslide.

== Campaign ==
Bongo was supported by the "New Alliance", a coalition that included the Association for Socialism in Gabon, the Circle of Liberal Reformers, the Gabonese Socialist Union and the People's Unity Party.

== Results ==
Based on exit polling at the time of the election, the news organization Reuters placed Bongo's share of the vote at about 37%. Voter turnout was 88.1%.

Candidate	Party	Votes	%
Omar Bongo	Gabonese Democratic Party	213,793	51.18
Paul Mba Abessole	National Woodcutters Rally	110,747	26.51
Pierre Louis Agondjo Okawe	Gabonese Progress Party	19,961	4.78
Pierre Claver Maganga Moussavou	Social Democratic Party	15,220	3.64
Jules-Aristide Bourdes-Ogouliguende	Independent	14,113	3.38
Alexandre Sambat	Independent	10,819	2.59
Didjob Divungi Di Ndinge	Democratic and Republican Alliance	9,203	2.20
Léon Mbou Yembi	African Forum for Reconstruction	7,625	1.83
Jean-Pierre Lemboumba-Lepandou	Independent Centre Party	5,768	1.38
Marc Saturnin Nan Nguéma	Independent	3,579	0.86
Simon Oyono Aba	MORENA–Original	3,466	0.83
Adrien Nguemah-Ondo	MORENA–Unionist	1,842	0.44
Léon Mébiame		1,583	0.38
Total		417,719	100.00
Valid votes		417,719	97.92
Invalid/blank votes		8,875	2.08
Total votes		426,594	100.00
Registered voters/turnout		484,319	88.08
Source: African Elections Database
