= Pierre Claver Maganga Moussavou =

Vice President of Gabon from 2017 to 2019

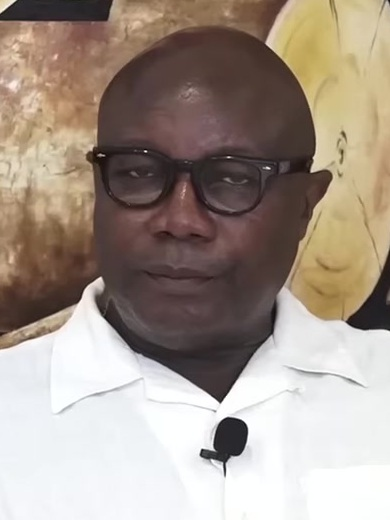
- Maganga Moussavou in 2023

5th Vice President of Gabon
- In office 21 August 2017 – 21 May 2019
- President: Ali Bongo Ondimba
- Preceded by: Didjob Divungi Di Ndinge (2009)
- Succeeded by: Rose Christiane Raponda (2023)

Personal details
- Born: 8 April 1952 (age 74) Mouila, French Equatorial Africa (present day Gabon)
- Party: Social Democratic Party
- Education: National University of Gabon; University of Rennes; University of Paris

Pierre Claver Maganga Moussavou (born 8 April 1952) is a Gabonese politician who served as Vice President of Gabon from 2017 to 2019. He is the President of the Social Democratic Party.

== Life and career ==
Born to a Punu family in Mouila, Maganga Moussavou studied economic history at the National University of Gabon, then at the University of Rennes. He completed a doctorate at the Sorbonne in just two years, his thesis entitled "L'aide publique de la France au développement du Gabon" being published in both French and English in the early 1980s. Returning to Gabon in 1978, he worked as Inspector General of Finance, an economic and financial adviser to the government, and then administrator of funds to the International Monetary Fund.

In 1990, Maganga Moussavou founded the Social Democratic Party. He stood for the party in the 1993 and 1998 presidential elections, never managing 1% of the vote. Despite this, President Omar Bongo appointed him to head a succession of ministries from the mid-1990s: Planning, Agriculture, Transport, Civil Aviation and Tourism.

Maganga Moussavou was elected as Mayor of the Second Arrondissement of Mouila in 2006, but was removed the following year, as Gabonese law prohibited serving parliamentarians from acting as local political representatives. In the election to replace him, he initially put up several proxy candidates, but subsequently withdrew them all and announced that his party was boycotting the vote. He also disrupted the counting of the vote by taking a ballot box to his house for several hours.

After Bongo's death, Maganga Moussavou announced his intention to stand in the 2009 presidential election. He initially remained Minister of Technical Education in Paul Biyoghe Mba's interim government, but following criticism from other opposition parties, he resigned his post three weeks before the election. His main policies were to promote population growth to a target of 5,000,000, to devolve more power to the regions, to double the minimum wage and to increase financial transparency. He received 0.76% of the votes cast.

Following his departure from the government in August 2009, Maganga Moussavou returned to his seat in the National Assembly. On 6 February 2010, while discussing his parliamentary work with health personnel in Mouila, Maganga Moussavou said that the PSD remained part of the Presidential Majority supporting President Ali Bongo. He also spoke positively of the budget for the 2010 fiscal year, noting the amount of money allocated for investment, although he also criticized the failure to assign money to various projects that were initiated during Omar Bongo's presidency.

Maganga Moussavou participated in the 2017 national political dialogue as a representative of the opposition; he was one of the few opposition leaders to participate in the dialogue, which was boycotted by Jean Ping and his allies. At the dialogue, Maganga Moussavou acted as one of the opposition's two co-presidents, along with René Ndemezo'o Obiang. Maganga Moussavou argued for the elimination of the ban on holding mayoral office while serving in Parliament. After the dialogue, he was appointed as Vice-President of Gabon on 21 August 2017. On 21 May 2019 he lost his position because of having been involved in illegal timber trading with a Chinese firm.
