= 1998 Gabonese presidential election =

- 6 December 1998
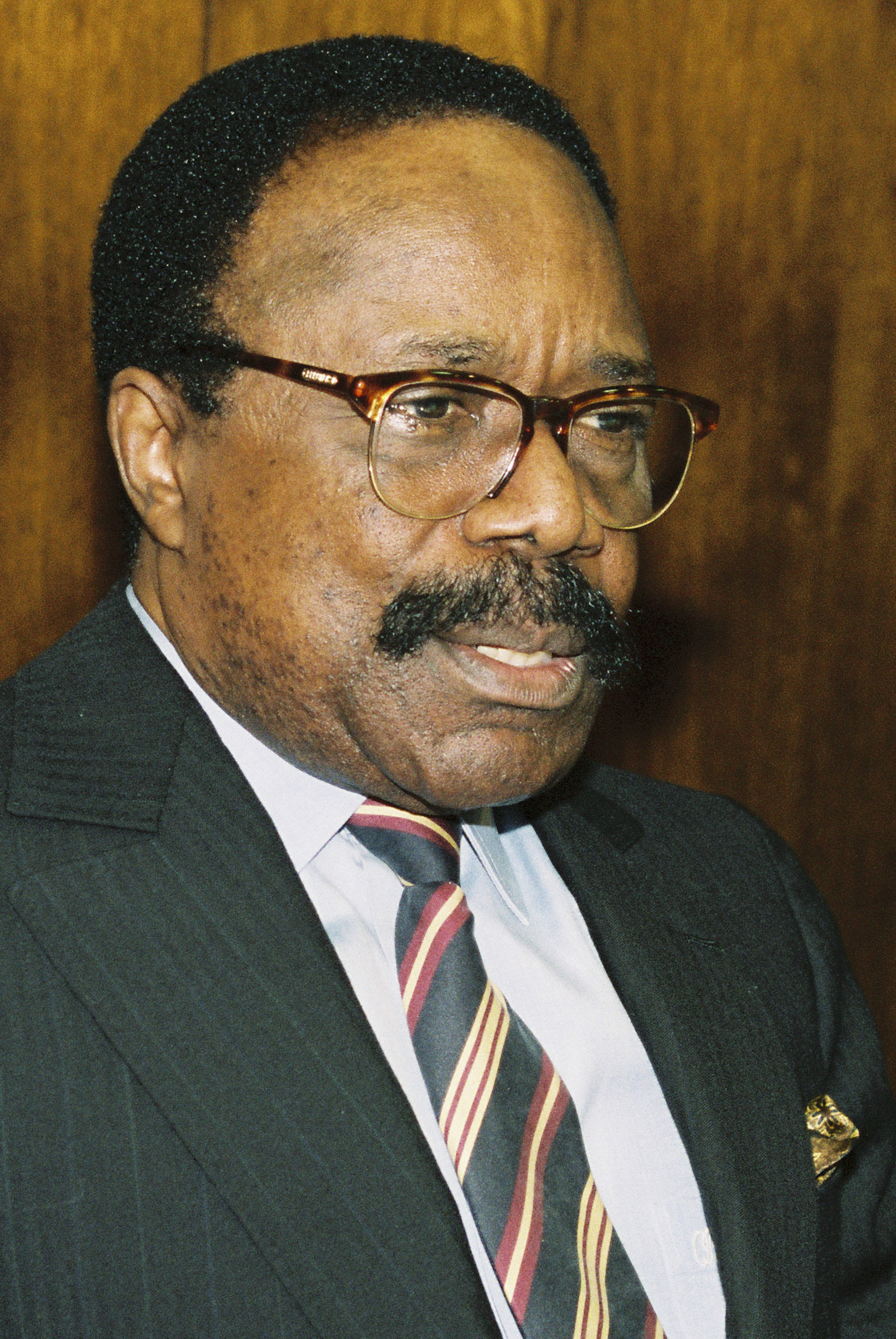

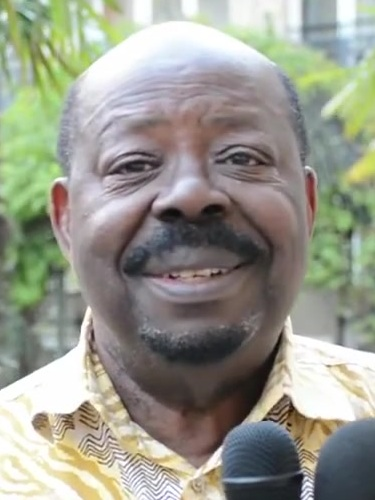
| Candidate | Omar Bongo | Pierre Mamboundou | Paul Mba Abessole |
| Party | PDG | UPG | RNB |
| Popular vote | 211,955 | 52,278 | 41,701 |
| Percentage | 66.88% | 16.50% | 13.16% |
President before election
Omar Bongo
PDG
Elected President
Omar Bongo
PDG

Presidential elections were held in Gabon on 6 December 1998. Incumbent President Omar Bongo, in power since 1967, sought a seven-year term against five other candidates. It was Gabon's second multi-party presidential election and, despite low turnout and polling problems, Bongo won the election with 66.88% of the vote.

== Campaign ==
In late July 1998, the ruling Gabonese Democratic Party (PDG) called for Bongo to run for re-election, praising him as a "trump card for the third millennium". Also in July, the opposition National Woodcutters' Rally (RNB) split into two factions, one headed by Paul Mba Abessole and one headed by Pierre-Andre Kombila, after Kombila was expelled from the party.

Pierre Mamboundou of the Union of the Gabonese People (UPG) ran as the candidate of the High Council of the Resistance, a coalition of opposition parties that included the UPG, the African Forum for Reconstruction, the Mebiame Group, MORENA–Original and the Socialist Emancipation Movement of the People. The Gabonese Progress Party (PGP) of Pierre-Louis Agondjo Okawé supported Mamboundou.

== Opinion polls ==
The publication of opinion polls was prohibited by the National Communication Council during the week immediately preceding the election.

== Results ==
According to final results from the Constitutional Court, Bongo won the election with 66.88% of the vote. Mamboundou officially placed second with 16.54% of the vote. Mamboundou denounced the official results as an "electoral coup d'etat" and called on the people to begin a "graduated response" by engaging in a stay at home ("ghost city") protest. Following the election, he alleged that commandos sent by the government tried to kill him on 12 December 1998. While Mamboundou's call for people to stay at home was mostly ignored in Libreville, Port-Gentil was reportedly "paralysed".

| Candidate | Party | Votes | % |
|---|---|---|---|
| Omar Bongo | Gabonese Democratic Party | 211,955 | 66.88 |
| Pierre Mamboundou | Union of the Gabonese People | 52,278 | 16.50 |
| Paul Mba Abessole | National Woodcutters' Rally | 41,701 | 13.16 |
| Pierre-André Kombila | National Woodcutters' Rally – Democratic | 4,847 | 1.53 |
| Pierre Claver Maganga Moussavou | Social Democratic Party | 3,152 | 0.99 |
| Martin Edzodzomo-Ela | Independent | 1,548 | 0.49 |
| Alain Engouang Nze | National Confederation of Woodcutters Associations | 892 | 0.28 |
| Joseph Adrien Mabicka Maguena | Independent | 527 | 0.17 |
| Total | | 316,900 | 100.00 |
Source: African Elections Database

== Aftermath ==
Jean-François Ntoutoume Emane was Bongo's campaign manager during the election, and he was subsequently appointed as Prime Minister in January 1999.
