= 2005 Gabonese presidential election =

- 27 November 2005
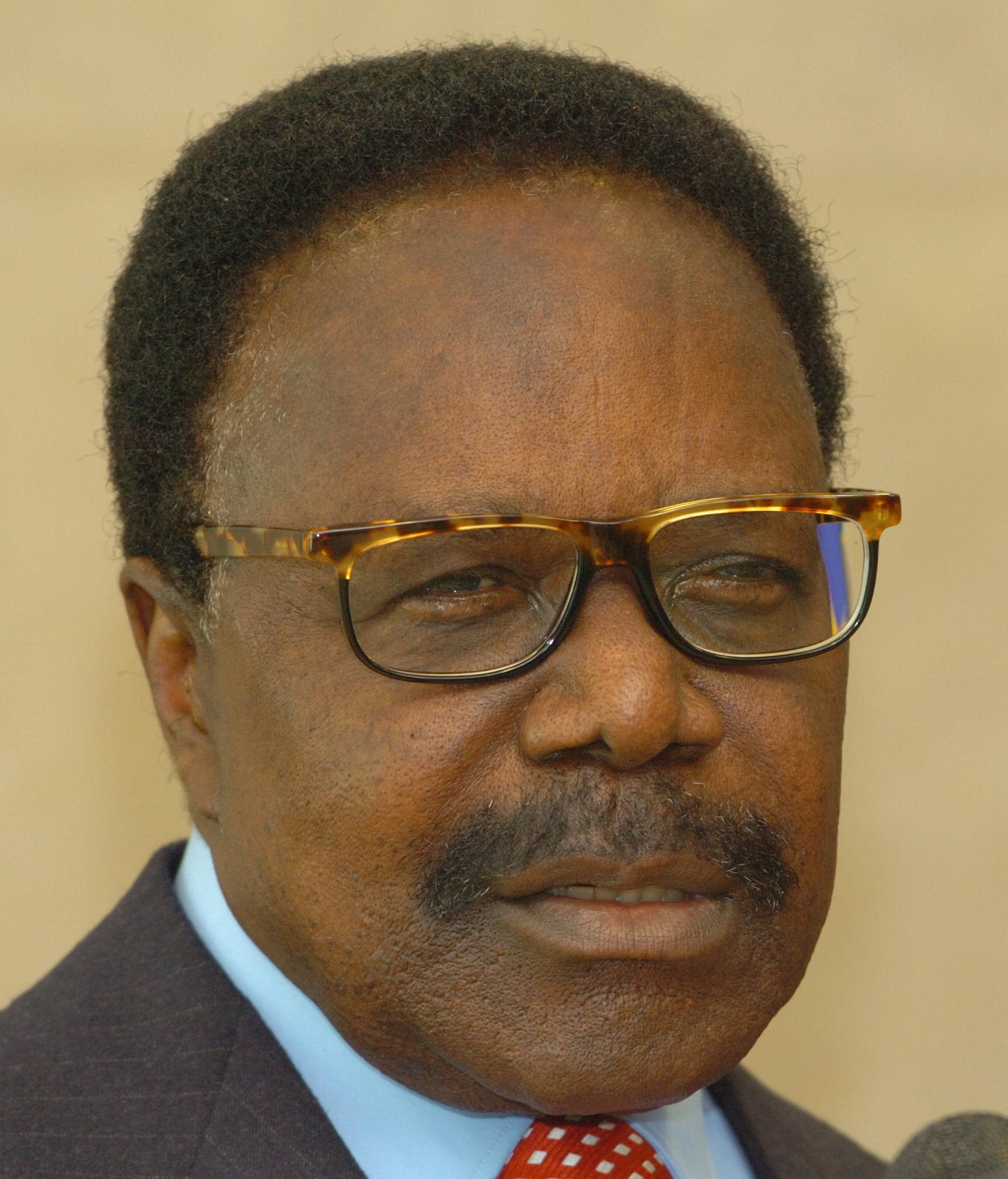

Candidate	Omar Bongo	Pierre Mamboundou	Zacharie Myboto
Party	PDG	UPG	Independent
Popular vote	275,819	47,410	22,921
Percentage	79.18%	13.61%	6.58%
President before election
Omar Bongo
PDG
Elected President
Omar Bongo
PDG

Presidential elections were held in Gabon on 27 November 2005. Incumbent President Omar Bongo, in power since 1967 (making him Africa's longest-serving ruler), sought another seven-year term against four other candidates. According to an announcement of results by the country's interior minister, the result was a victory for Bongo, who received 79.2% of the vote. Bongo was sworn in for another seven-year term on 19 January 2006.

== Background ==
On 6 October 2005, Gilbert Ngoulakia, the President of the National Electoral Commission, announced that the elections would be held on 27 November, with security forces voting two days earlier on 25 November. Opposition leader Zacharie Myboto denounced this as "additional proof of laws being fiddled to keep the ruling regime in power", arguing that having the soldiers vote on a different day would facilitate vote rigging and that it might be possible for them to vote a second time on 27 November. The decision to have soldiers vote on a different day was officially attributed to the need to have them available to keep the peace when the general population voted.

== Electoral system ==
Well in advance of the elections, Parliament voted to remove term limits on the Presidency, which would have prohibited Bongo from running again; it also voted to hold presidential elections on a first-past-the-post basis, with no second round in the event that the leading candidate fell short of a majority. The electoral code was changed by Parliament in late June 2005.

== Campaign ==
On 6 October, Ngoulakia said that campaigning would begin at midnight on 13 October, 30 hours after the deadline for candidacies. The campaigning period was to end on 26 November.

Protesting the composition of the 120-member National Electoral Commission, the opposition initially refused to participate in it, but following negotiations the opposition was granted 40 seats on the Commission on 7 October and ended its boycott. Five candidates registered to contest the elections.

Bongo announced his candidacy before a crowd of thousands in Libreville on 1 October 2005. He made a series of gestures to alleviate poverty, such as saying that 100,000 households would be provided free water and electricity for one month, and money was frequently distributed at his campaign rallies. Critics argued that Bongo was simply buying votes.

Gabonese Progress Party (PGP) leader Pierre-Louis Agondjo Okawé announced on 4 March 2005 that he would not be a candidate. This decision was attributed to old age and declining health. Agondjo Okawé died in August 2005, and the PGP experienced internal disagreement regarding its choice of a presidential candidate.

Pierre Mamboundou, who officially placed second in the December 1998 presidential elections, ran again as the candidate of the opposition Union of the Gabonese People (UPG). UPG Secretary-General Richard Moulomba claimed that Mamboundou was robbed of victory in 1998 and vowed that it would not happen again, warning that "if Omar Bongo and his cronies actually try to pull off the fraud they're preparing, what will happen, will happen." The UPG said that opinion polls showed Mamboundou to be the most popular candidate, with Bongo trailing in third place.

Myboto, who was for years a leading figure in the PDG regime, resigned from the party in April 2005. On 9 October 2005, he officially announced his candidacy before a crowd of over 5,000 supporters. Although he had founded the Gabonese Union for Democracy and Development earlier in the year, it had not been recognised by the authorities, resulting in him running as an independent. Fiercely critical of Bongo and the government, Myboto alleged that Bongo had won the 1998 elections through fraud. He said that the government was seeking to depict the opposition as "irresponsible", but that in fact "they are the ones who want to set this country ablaze and they want us to be held responsible for what they are preparing." A Libreville rally in support of Myboto in early November was prevented by soldiers.

== Results ==
Interior Minister Clotaire-Christian Ivala announced results on television on the evening of 29 November. According to these results, Bongo was overwhelmingly re-elected with over 79% of the vote, while Mamboundou and Myboto trailed distantly in second and third place respectively. Mamboundou and Myboto immediately denounced the results as fraudulent. International observers generally endorsed the elections as acceptable.

The National Electoral Commission placed turnout at 63.29%, although a western diplomat in Gabon said that it was probably about 30–35%. Low turnout had been widely anticipated by observers due to the popular feeling that Bongo would inevitably win the elections.

Candidate	Party	Votes	%
Omar Bongo	Gabonese Democratic Party	275,819	79.18
Pierre Mamboundou	Union of the Gabonese People	47,410	13.61
Zacharie Myboto	Independent	22,921	6.58
Augustin Moussavou King	Gabonese Socialist Party	1,149	0.33
Christian Maronga	Rally of Democrats	1,045	0.30
Total		348,344	100.00
Valid votes		348,344	98.65
Invalid/blank votes		4,782	1.35
Total votes		353,126	100.00
Registered voters/turnout		554,967	63.63
Source: African Elections Database

== Aftermath ==
Mamboundou and Myboto held a press conference on 1 December and said that the elections were marred by a variety of irregularities: "Ballot-stuffing, multiple votes including in the name of deceased people, influence peddling, vote buying, and outsiders posing as Gabonese to cast a ballot." They urged "the Gabonese people to rise up and march peacefully ... not to take to the streets immediately but rather to take concrete and responsible action." Hundreds of opposition supporters then began to march through the streets of Libreville; the police used batons against the demonstrators and arrested 23 of them. On 2 December, the government urged the opposition to accept the results, "renounce anything that might upset public order and instead turn their eyes to future."

Mamboundou and Myboto called for a general strike in early December, alleging fraud. Later in the month, they legally appealed against the results. The Constitutional Court rejected the appeals on 5 January 2006, although it did annul the results from a single polling station in Koulamoutou due to a "serious incident"; at that polling station, results showed Bongo receiving 150 votes, Myboto receiving 100 votes, and none of the other candidates receiving any votes. The elimination of that polling station's votes was insufficient to affect the outcome, and Bongo's victory was confirmed with an official score of 79.18%.
