= 2011 Gabonese parliamentary election =

- 27 December 2011
- All 120 seats in the National Assembly; 61 seats needed for a majority
| Party | Leader | Seats | +/– |
|---|---|---|---|
| PDG | Ali Bongo Ondimba | 113 | +31 |
| RNB-RPG | Paul Mba Abessole | 3 | −5 |
| CLR | | 1 | −1 |
| PGCI | | 1 | +1 |
| PSD | Pierre Claver Maganga Moussavou | 1 | −1 |
| UPNR | Louis-Gaston Mayila | 1 | New |
This lists parties that won seats. See the complete results below.

Parliamentary elections were held in Gabon on 17 December 2011. Amidst an opposition boycott, the ruling Gabonese Democratic Party (PDG) won a landslide victory; official results were announced on 21 December 2011, showing that the PDG won 113 out of 120 seats, the most it had won since the beginning of multiparty politics in the early 1990s. A few other parties won the handful of seats remaining: the Rally for Gabon (RPG) won three seats, while the Circle of Liberal Reformers (CLR), the Independent Centre Party (PGCI), Social Democratic Party (PSD), and the Union for the New Republic (UPRN) won a single seat each.

Turnout was 34%, with many opposition supporters choosing to boycott.

== Results ==
Alongside the PDG, the Rally for Gabon, Circle of Liberal Reformers, Independent Centre Party, Democratic and Republican Alliance, Morena–Original, Rally for Democracy and Progress were all part of the Republican Majority for Emergence coalition.

| Party | Seats | +/– |
|---|---|---|
| Gabonese Democratic Party | 113 | +31 |
| Rally for Gabon | 3 | –5 |
| Circle of Liberal Reformers | 1 | –1 |
| Independent Centre Party | 1 | +1 |
| Social Democratic Party | 1 | –1 |
| Union for the New Republic | 1 | New |
| 7MP | 0 | – |
| African Forum for Reconstruction | 0 | –1 |
| Alliance for New Gabon | 0 | – |
| Christian Democratic Bloc | 0 | – |
| Democratic and Republican Alliance | 0 | –3 |
| Energy of Independent People | 0 | – |
| Gabonese National Party | 0 | – |
| Gabonese Progress Party | 0 | –2 |
| Gabonese Socialist Union | 0 | – |
| MORENA–Boutamba | 0 | – |
| MORENA–Mendou | 0 | – |
| MORENA–Original | 0 | – |
| National Ecological Party | 0 | – |
| National Union of Blacksmiths | 0 | – |
| Party for Development and Solidarity | 0 | – |
| Rally for Democracy and Progress | 0 | – |
| Union of the Gabonese People | 0 | –8 |
| United Socialist Party | 0 | – |
| Total | 120 | 0 |
Source: Elections Gabon (parties) IPU (seats)
