= 2001 Gabonese parliamentary election =

Parliamentary elections were held in Gabon on 9 and 23 December 2001. The result was a victory for the ruling Gabonese Democratic Party, which won 86 of the 120 seats in the National Assembly.

Some opposition parties boycotted the elections.

== Results ==
Party	Seats	+/–
Gabonese Democratic Party	86	+1
National Woodcutters' Rally – Rally for Gabon	8	+1
Democratic and Republican Alliance	3	+2
Gabonese Progress Party	3	–7
Circle of Liberal Reformers	2	0
African Development Movement	1	New
Congress for Democracy and Justice	1	0
National Woodcutters' Rally – Democratic	1	New
People's Unity Party	1	New
Social Democratic Party	1	New
Independents	12	+5
Vacant	1	–
Total	120	0
Source: African Elections Database
