= 1996 Gabonese parliamentary election =

Parliamentary elections were held in Gabon on 15 and 29 December 1996. The result was a victory for the ruling Gabonese Democratic Party, which won 85 of the 120 seats in the National Assembly.

== Results ==
Party	Seats	+/–
Gabonese Democratic Party	85	+22
Gabonese Progress Party	10	–8
National Woodcutters' Rally	7	–13
Circle of Liberal Reformers	2	New
Gabonese Socialist Union	2	–2
African Forum for Reconstruction	1	New
Circle for Renewal and Progress	1	0
Congress for Democracy and Justice	1	New
Democratic and Republican Alliance	1	New
MORENA–Original	1	–6
Rally for Democracy and Progress	1	New
Union of the Gabonese People	1	New
Independents	7	+7
Total	120	0
Source: African Elections Database
