= List of rivers of Gabon =

This is a list of rivers in Gabon. This list is arranged by drainage basin, with respective tributaries indented under each larger stream's name.

== Atlantic Ocean ==
The Ogooué drainage basin

- Campo River (Ntem River)
  - Kyé River
  - Nyé River
- Benito River (Mbini River) (Woleu River)
- Utamboni River
- Noya River
- Komo River
  - Mbeya River
- Ogooué River
  - Ngounie River
    - Ikoy River
      - Ikobe River
      - Oumba River
    - Ovigui River
    - Dollé River
    - Ogoulou River
    - Louetsié River
    - Ngongo River
  - Mbine River
  - Abanga River
    - Nkan River
  - Okano River
    - Lara River
  - Ngolo River
  - Offoue River
  - Nke River
  - Ivindo River
    - Mvung River
      - Kuye River
    - Mounianghi River
    - Libumba River
      - Lodié River
    - Oua River
    - Djadie River
    - Djoua River
    - Aïna River
  - Dilo River
  - Lolo River
    - Wagny River
    - Lebiyou River
    - Bouenguidi River
  - Lassio River
  - Sebe River
    - Loula River
    - Lebiri River
  - Leyou River
  - Lekoni River
    - Lekey River
  - Lekabi River
  - Lekedi River
  - Lebombi River
  - Mpassa River
  - Baniaka River
  - Letili River
- Nkomi River
- Nyanga River
  - Moukalaba River
    - Ganzi River
  - Douli River
- Douigni River
