= Chaillu Massif =

Mountain range in Gabon

Coordinates: 2°32′0″S 11°10′0″E

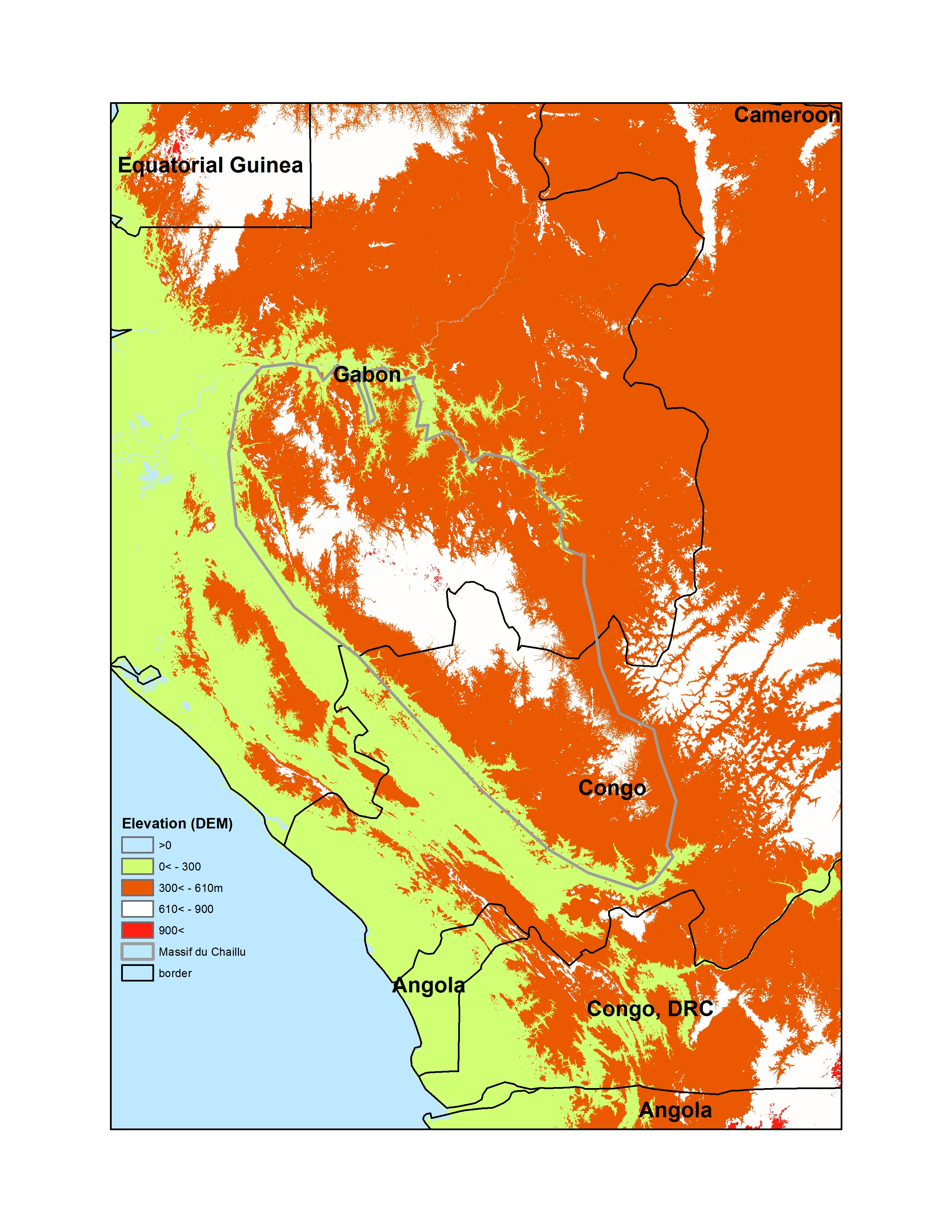
The Chaillu Mountains

The Chaillu Mountains are a mountain range straddling southern Gabon and the Republic of Congo which is named after the French explorer Paul Du Chaillu, who explored and documented this region in the 19th century.

The highest peaks are Mont Iboundji (980m), and Mt Mimongo (1020 m). The rocks of the range are sedimentary in origin.

The range is home to the rises of several rivers including the Louesse, Ogoulou, Ikoy, Lolo, Lekoko, Lebombi, and Offoue.
