= Synodontis albolineatus =

Conservation status
- Least Concern (IUCN 3.1)

Scientific classification
- Domain: Eukaryota
- Kingdom: Animalia
- Phylum: Chordata
- Class: Actinopterygii
- Order: Siluriformes
- Family: Mochokidae
- Genus: Synodontis
- Species: S. albolineatus

Binomial name
- Synodontis albolineatus Pellegrin, 1924

Synonyms
- Synodontis albolineata Pellegrin 1924

Species of fish

Synodontis albolineatus, known as the mustard catfish, or the mustard squeaker, is a species of upside-down catfish native to Gabon and Cameroon, where it occurs in the Ntem and Ivindo rivers. It was first described by French zoologist Jacques Pellegrin in 1924, based upon a holotype discovered in the Djoua River at Madjingo, Gabon. The holotype specimen resides in the Musee National d' Histoire Naturelle de Paris. The specific name "albolineatus" is a composite from the Latin word albus for "white" and the Latin word linea for "line", which refers to the white midlateral stripe of the species.

== Description ==
The body of the fish is a dark brown to black with turquoise-brown marbled or spotted markings; spots are smaller on the head. A thick, white lateral line appears in adults that horizontally along the length of the fish. The fins are clear with brown spots. The dorsal fin is composed of one prominent hard spine and seven soft rays.

Like other members of the genus, this fish has a humeral process, which is a bony spike that is attached to a hardened head cap on the fish and can be seen extending beyond the gill opening. The first ray of the dorsal fin and the pectoral fins have a hardened first ray which is serrated. The caudal fin is forked with two equal lobes. It has short, cone-shaped teeth in the upper jaw. In the lower jaw, the teeth are s-shaped and movable. The fish has one pair of maxillary barbels, and two pairs of mandibular barbels that are often branched.

This species grows to a length of 10 centimetres (3.9 in) SL although specimens up to 17.2 centimetres (6.8 in) TL have been recorded in the wild.

== Habitat ==
In the wild, the species has been found in only four locations on the Ntem and Ivindo rivers.
