= Mitsogo people =

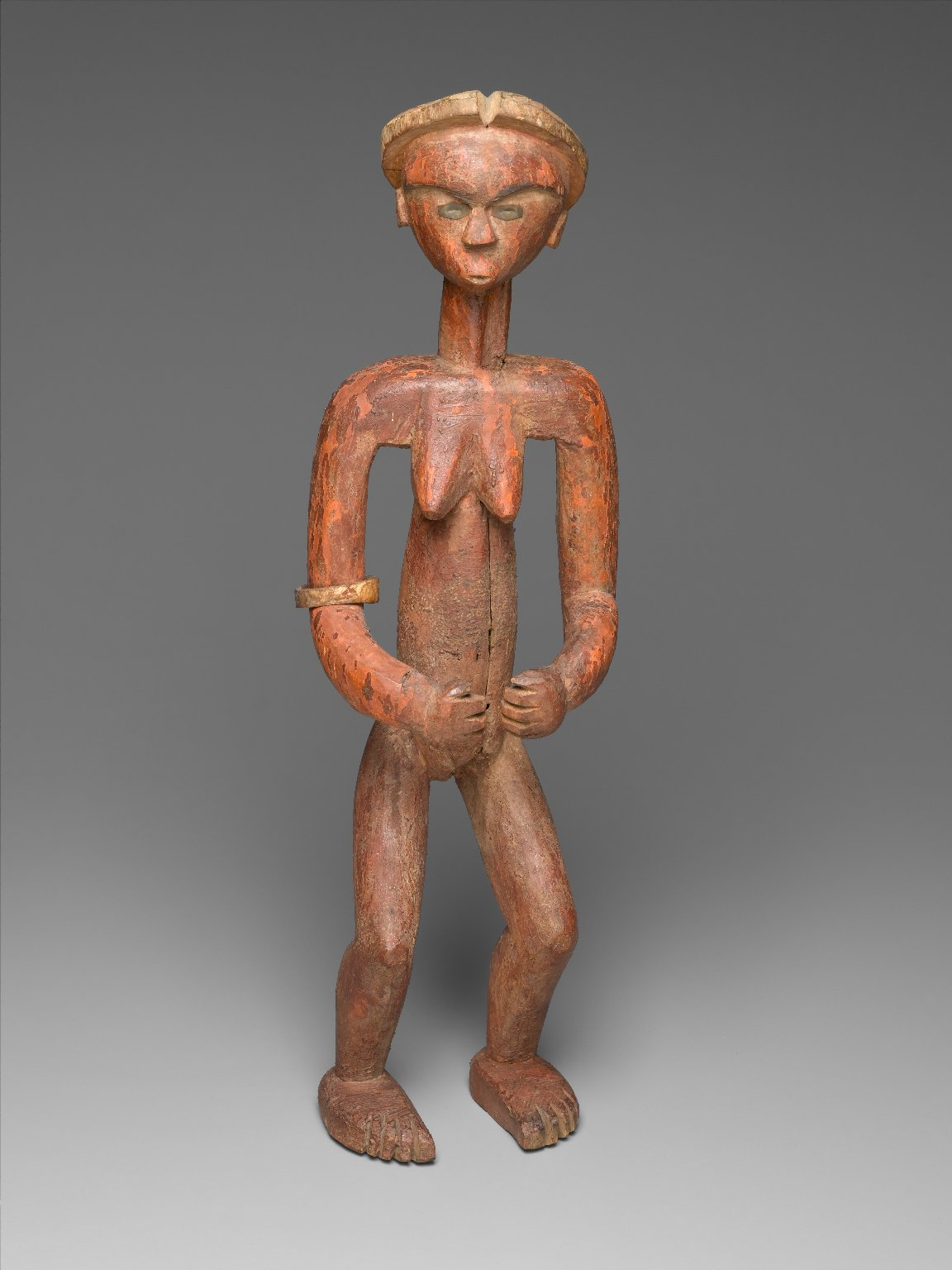
- A Tsogo female figurine

Total population
- 19,000

Languages
- Tsogo

Religion
- NA

The Mitsogho, Mitsogho, or Tsogo are an ethno-cultural group from the highlands of Gabon. They reside mainly in Ngounié Province to the north and east of Mouila. Numbering around 13,000 to 15,000, they speak the Tsogo language.

== Description ==
There are about 13,000 to 15,000 Mitsogho people who speak the Tsogo language. They reside mainly in Ngounié Province in southern-central Gabon, to the north and east of Mouila.The region is named after the major river, Ngounié River, a tributary of the Ogooué River, and is so associated with the Mitsogho that it is often referred to as "Mitsogho country". It is sometimes also known as Mitsogho. The area is also known for its humid and mountainous climate which help prevent access and contribute to the lack of information on the tribe. The tribe is broken up into smaller mobile communities where they practice slash and burn agriculture as well as hunting and fishing.

== History ==
=== Early history ===
Mitsogho history has been passed down orally for centuries creating clear connections with surrounding communities as well as historians. The Mitsogho people are rumored to have migrated from the eastern side of the Congo to the valleys that connect to the Ogowe river during the Stone Age. language based information helps fortify this claim as. It shows a connection to dialects spoken by the Myene people which helps fortify the belief that the Mitsogho people split off from a main group of society and started creating a standard cultural way of life in around 4000, BP to 3200 BP. Presently, both different ethnic groups can trace their heritage to the iron and Neolithic ages which still continues to enforce their customs through throughout Mitsogho society.

=== Initiation society history ===
Taking inspiration from ancient initiation practices, the Mitsogho people organize into six distinct matrilineal organizations that assist with the initiation of new members into society. Like many other initiation societies, men and women are separated, and both undertake various separate forms of training or rituals that prepare young adults for every day life and the overall induction into society. Each of the separate societies are dedicated to different levels of knowledge and control different aspects of how it is shared and distributed through the initiates the most widely -known and revered one being Bwiti.

=== Mitsogho’s history with the French ===
The French encountered the Mitsogho people in 1857, when they totalled approximately 5000 people. They become known for their skills in iron and cloth manufacturing. In the 1890s the Tsogo-speaking clans of the Matèndè, Dibuwa, and Waka districts along the Ikoy River clashed with Kele invaders. The Kele took their women and children to increase their own numbers and fertility. As a result, Mitsogo clans settled in districts inhabited by Punu and Apindji speaking clans.

In 1899, the French established a military outpost and Roman Catholic mission in the region and the Mitsogo people came fully under their control. In the early 20th century the Mitsogo the conflicted with the Bakele people. They put up a strong resistance in 1907, with the Mitsogo-Kamba clan fighting a fierce battle with the Bakele near Mount Motende. The conflict solidified Tsogo identity. The Mitsogo chief Mbombe was particularly known for his freedom fighting against the French. One major uprising broke out in 1904. He was eventually captured in 1913 and executed at the prison in Mouila.

== Bwiti practice ==
To prepare for a Bwiti ritual, tribe members called movenga decorate the ebanza (ritual hut) with carven objects that represent the ancestral father (Nzambe-Kana) and mother (Disumba), as well as different parts of the human body. Within the ebanza are musical instruments, furnishings, and implements for the ritual. Among the instruments played during the ceremony are gongs and harps with human head embellishments; the harps represent Disumba.

=== Iboga use ===
In Bwiti practice, initiates may consume a sizeable dose of a powder mad by grinding the root bark of the iboga tree. The powder evokes visions that are thought to bridge the physical world and the spiritual realm from which the iboga tree originated. In Mitsogho culture, it is said that the iboga tree created itself, and that it is the food of the gods; by partaking in it, one becomes spiritually closer with one's ancestral spirits.

== See also ==
- Beti-Pahuin peoples
