= Ogooué-Leketi National Park =

National park in the Republic of the Congo

Coordinates: 2°S 13.6167°E

- IUCN category II (national park)
- Location within Republic of the Congo
- Location: Lekoumou, Plateaux, Republic of the Congo
- Area: 3,500 km^{2} (1,400 sq mi)
- Established: November 9, 2018
- Governing body: Ministry for National Forestry Commission

The Ogooué-Leketi National Park is a national park in the Republic of the Congo, established on 9 November 2018. This site has an area of 3,500 km^{2} on the border with Gabon's Batéké Plateau National Park.

== History ==
Since 2004, the Wildlife Conservation Society (WCS) and the Ministry of Forestry Economy have carried out detailed biological and socio-economic surveys in and around the proposed Ogooué-Leketi National Park (OLNP), to evaluate the conservation potential of this area, and to define the appropriate boundaries and benefits of the new protected area. Following the closure of the three logging concessions that overlapped the proposed protected area, Ogooué-Leketi has officially been declared Congo's fifth National Park.

== Geography and flora ==
The OLNP lies in a unique landscape, dominated by vast rolling savannahs in the east, with green ribbons of gallery forest linking up to a larger rainforest block to the north and west. Within this forest is a constellation of swampy, mineral-rich forest clearings that offer unique opportunities to view forest wildlife. It contains the headwaters of both the Ogooué River, the main river of Gabon and the Leketi River, which feeds the Alima and eventually the Congo River.

== Fauna ==
The park is home to forest gorillas, chimpanzees, forest elephants, forest buffalo, red river hog, several species of monkey including the mandrill, and other threatened species such as common duiker, side-striped jackal, three species of bustard, Congo moor chat (Traquet-fourmilier du Congo), Brazza's martin (Hirondelle de Brazza), and a probable new species of cisticola. The park has been designated an Important Bird Area (IBA) by BirdLife International because it supports significant populations of many bird species.
