= Lekoni =

Lekoni may refer to:

- Lékoni, Gabon, a town in Haut-Ogooué Province
- Lekoni River
- Lékoni Airport (List of airports by IATA code: L)
