= Synodontis punu =

Scientific classification
- Kingdom: Animalia
- Phylum: Chordata
- Class: Actinopterygii
- Order: Siluriformes
- Family: Mochokidae
- Genus: Synodontis
- Species: S. punu

Binomial name
- Synodontis punu Vreven & Milondo, 2009, 2009

Species of fish

Synodontis punu is a species of upside-down catfish native to the Republic of the Congo and Gabon, where it is known from the Nyanga, Kouilou-Niari and Ngounié river basins. This species grows to a length of 5.5 centimetres (2.2 in) SL.
