= Tsogo =

Tsogo may be:

- The Tsogo people of Gabon (Mitsogo)
- The Tsogo language (Getsogo)
