= Bongolo =

Bongolo may refer to:

== Gabon ==
- Bongolo, Gabon
- Bongolo Hospital
- Bongolo Caves

== Republic of Congo ==
- Bongolo, Republic of Congo

== Other ==
- Bongolo (film)

== See also ==
- Bongolo Dam (disambiguation)
