= Sebe (disambiguation) =

Sebe is a formal capital of German Togoland.

Sebe may also refer to:

- SEbE, or Southeast by east, a compass point
- Sebe, a variety of the Bine language of Papua New Guinea
- Sebe River in Gabon
- Sebe (surname)

== See also ==
- Sebe-Brikolo Department, a department in eastern Gabon
- Sebbe, a 2010 Swedish film
- Sebeh, a ritual performed on the Korean New Year
- Seebe, Alberta, a former hamlet in Canada
