= Akiéni =

- Town
- Coat of arms

- Location in Gabon
- Coordinates: 1°11′S 13°53′E
- Country: Gabon
- Province: Haut-Ogooué
- Department: Lekoni-Lekori

Population (2013)
  - Total: 6,857
- Time zone: UTC+1 (WAT)

Akiéni is a small town in Lekoni-Lekori Department in Haut-Ogooue in north-eastern Gabon. It lies along the road to Leconi and is set in a valley on the northern side of the Baniaka River. It is served by Akieni Airport. As of 2013, the town has a population of 6.857, of which 3.084 are female and 3.773 are male.

== Notable people ==
- Jean-Boniface Assélé
- Jean-Marie Adzé
- Luc Marat Abila
- Ndouna Dépénaud
