= Adane =

Adane is a given name or surname.

Notable people with the given name include:

- Adane Girma (born 1985), Ethiopian footballer

Notable people with the surname include:

- Mentesenot Adane (born 1993), Ethiopian footballer

== See also ==
- Adané
