= Ngounié =

Ngounié may mean:

- Ngounié Province, Gabon
- Ngounié River, Gabon
