= Crystal Mountain =

Crystal Mountain or Crystal Mountains may refer to:

== Mountains ==
- Crystal Mountain (Alaska)
- Monte Cristallo, Italy
- Crystal Mountain (Egypt), between Bahariya Oasis and Farafra Oasis, Egypt

== Mountain ranges ==
- Crystal Range, a small group of mountains in California
- Crystal Mountains (Brazil), a mountain range located in Brazil
- Crystal Mountains (Africa), a mountain range located on the west coast of central Africa

== Populated place ==
- Crystal Mountain, Michigan, United States, a census-designated place

== Ski areas ==
- Crystal Mountain (Washington), a ski resort in Washington, United States
- Crystal Mountain (British Columbia), a day-use ski area near West Kelowna, British Columbia in Canada
- Crystal Mountain (Michigan), a four-star ski resort located near Thompsonville, in Benzie County, Michigan

== Music ==
- "Crystal Mountain", a 1995 song by Death from their album Symbolic
- "Crystal Mountain", a 1982 song by Kenny G from his eponymous debut album Kenny G

== Other ==
- Crystal Mountains National Park, national park in northwestern Gabon
- Sierra Cristal National Park, a park in Cuba
