= Nzorbang =

Nzorbang Nzoghbang (Fang language)
- Location in Gabon
- Coordinates: 0°39′6.2″S 10°13′46.4″E
- Country: Gabon
- Province: Moyen-Ogooué Province

Nzorbang is a small town in Moyen-Ogooué Province, in northwestern Gabon. It lies across the Ogooue River about 8 kilometres north of Lambaréné, just south of Adané.

The N1 road runs in the area. Nzorbang is biologically rich lying on the river and has been subject to several biological studies. In 1906 a study revealed Chromidotillapia in the area. Teleostei and Microsynodontis have also been observed in the river.
