= Badondo =

Mont Badondo
- Location within Republic of the Congo

Highest point
- Peak: Mont Badondo
- Elevation: 934 m (3,064 ft)
- Coordinates: 1°32′41″N 13°14′7″E

Geography
- Location: Republic of the Congo
- Department: Sangha

The Badondo Mountains (French: Monts Badondo) are a mountain range in northwestern Congo-Brazzaville. Mont Badondo is the highest peak in the range, at about 900m above sea level.

The mountain range is located between the Ivindo River and the Karagoua River. They lie close to the border with Gabon and are also not far from the border with Cameroon.

== Mining ==
The Badondo Mountains are the site of iron ore deposits.
