= Mboungou-Mbadouma =

Town in Gabon

- Location in Gabon
- Coordinates: 2°7′0″S 11°11′0″E
- Country: Gabon
- Province: Ngounié Province

Mboungou Mbadouma is a town in Gabon. It is located near the confluence between the Ogooue and the Leconi Rivers.

== Transport ==
It lies near the Trans-Gabon Railway.
