= Abanga River =

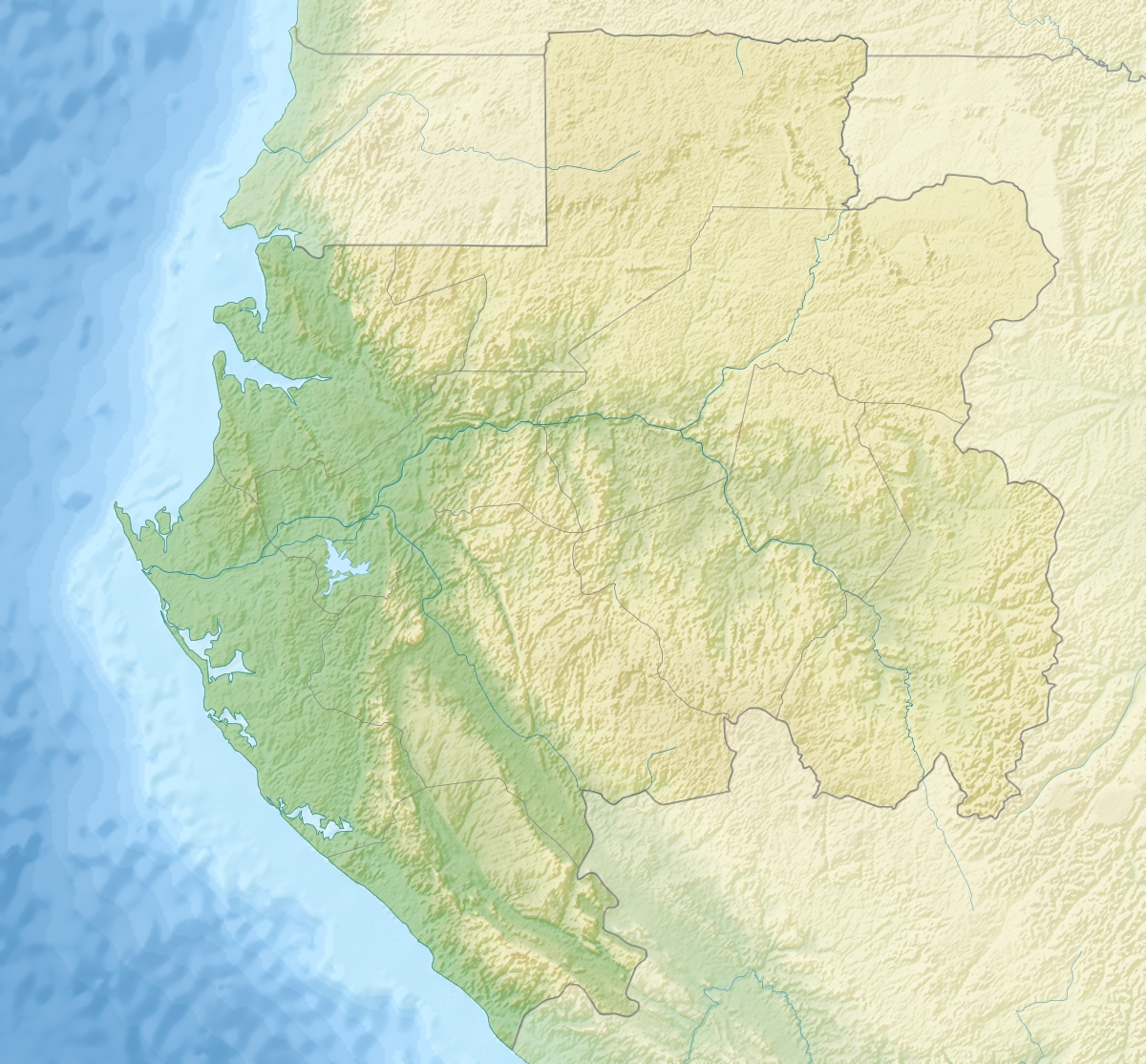
- Location of mouth in Gabon

Location
- Country: Gabon

Physical characteristics
- Mouth
  - coordinates: 0°18′32″S 10°28′45″E

The Abanga River is a river of Gabon. It is one of the right tributaries of the Ogooué. It rises in the Cristal Mountains, near Medouneu. It is about 160 km long. It joins the Ogooué River near the town of Bifoun.

== Overview ==
The Abanga River is a river in central Gabon and one of the principal right-bank tributaries of the Ogooué River, the country's largest river system. It rises in the Cristal Mountains near Medouneu in Woleu-Ntem Province and flows generally south-eastward for approximately 160 km (99 mi) before joining the Ogooué River near the town of Bifoun. The river forms part of the extensive Ogooué drainage basin, one of the largest and most important hydrographic systems in Central Africa.

== Geography ==
The Abanga River is a right-bank tributary of the Ogooué River in central Gabon. It rises in the Cristal Mountains near Medouneu and flows generally south-eastward for approximately 160 km before joining the Ogooué River near the town of Bifoun.

The river drains part of the humid equatorial rainforest of north-central Gabon. Its basin receives abundant annual rainfall, contributing to relatively stable streamflow throughout much of the year compared with rivers in more seasonal tropical climates.

The Abanga contributes freshwater, sediments and organic matter to the Ogooué River system, supporting aquatic habitats characteristic of the Congo–Guinean rainforest region.. The Abanga is listed among the major right-bank tributaries of the Ogooué together with the Ivindo, Okano and Nké rivers.

== Hydrology ==
Because the Abanga lies within the equatorial climatic zone of Gabon, its discharge is strongly influenced by abundant rainfall distributed over two wet seasons each year. Although no long-term hydrometric station is known to operate on the river itself, hydrological studies of the Ogooué Basin indicate that tributaries draining the Cristal Mountains contribute substantially to the basin's perennial flow and seasonal discharge variability.

Recent hydrological modelling has shown that streamflow across the Ogooué Basin is closely linked to rainfall variability and large-scale climate oscillations, including the El Niño–Southern Oscillation, suggesting that tributaries such as the Abanga respond to broader regional hydro-climatic patterns.

== Environment ==
The Abanga River flows almost entirely through the humid tropical forests of Gabon, one of the least disturbed rainforest regions in Africa. Its catchment forms part of the Congo–Guinean forest landscape, where rivers provide habitat for diverse freshwater fish, amphibians, reptiles and aquatic invertebrates while also transporting sediments and organic matter to the Ogooué River.

== Human use ==
Communities living along the Abanga River rely on its waters for domestic use, artisanal fishing and local transportation. The surrounding forests also support forestry activities, although the basin remains considerably less urbanised than many other Central African river systems. Due to its location within the Ogooué Basin, the river contributes indirectly to the ecological and economic importance of Gabon's largest watershed.

== Scientific importance ==
Although the Abanga River has received comparatively little direct scientific attention, it is regularly included in basin-wide hydrological, climatic and biogeochemical studies of the Ogooué watershed. These investigations have improved understanding of tropical river hydrology, flood dynamics, carbon transport and the influence of climate variability on one of Africa's major equatorial river systems.

=== See also ===
- Ogooué River
- List of rivers of Gabon
- Cristal Mountains
