= Ngounié River =

Coordinates: 0°47′38″S 10°29′21″E

Ngounié
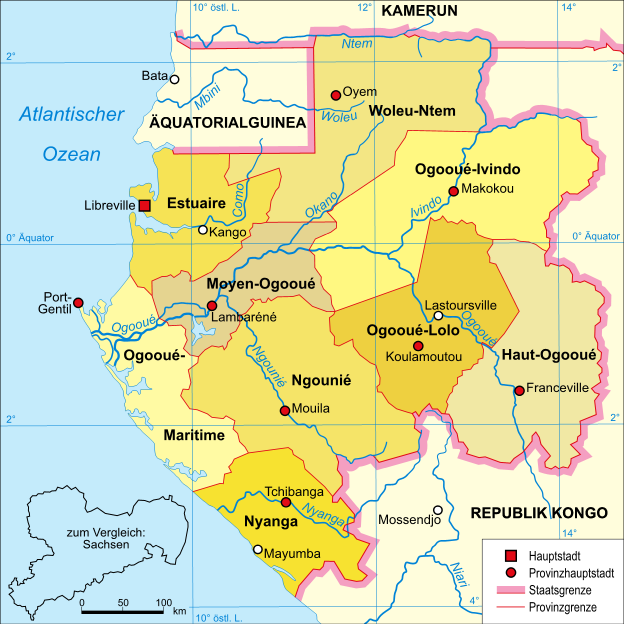
- The Ngounié River flows through southwest-central Gabon, flowing through Mouila
- Native name: Rivière Ngounié (French)

Location
- Country: Gabon

Physical characteristics
- Source
  - location: Chaillu Mountains, Republic of the Congo
- Mouth
  - location: Lambaréné, Gabon
- Length: 680 km (420 mi)
- Basin size: 33,100 km^{2} (12,800 sq mi)

The Ngounié River (also Ngunyé, French: Rivière Ngounié) is a river flowing through southwest-central Gabon. It is the last and second most important tributary of the Ogooué River, the first being the Ivindo River. It initially flows down from the Chaillu Mountains, along the border with Congo, and then turns northwest, flowing through the towns of Fougamou, Sindara and Mouila before flowing into the Ogooué.

== Etymology ==
The river name, Ngounié, is a French rewording of "Ngugni", which was originally used by Vili language speakers in the Samba Falls/Imperatrice Falls area in the mid-1800s to call the northern border of their district, "Nsina-Ngugni". When Robert Bruce Napoleon Walker and Paul Du Chaillu arrived in the area, they wrote down "Ngouyai" or "Ngunyé". The Gisir and Punu language speakers of Gabon know the river as "Durembu-du-Manga", while the Apindji, Eviya and Tsogo speakers know it as Otembo-a-Manga. The Kele speakers know it as "Melembye-a-Manga". The first part of these names means "body of water" in the given languages, and "manga" refers to dwarf palm trees which grow along its bank.

== Geography ==
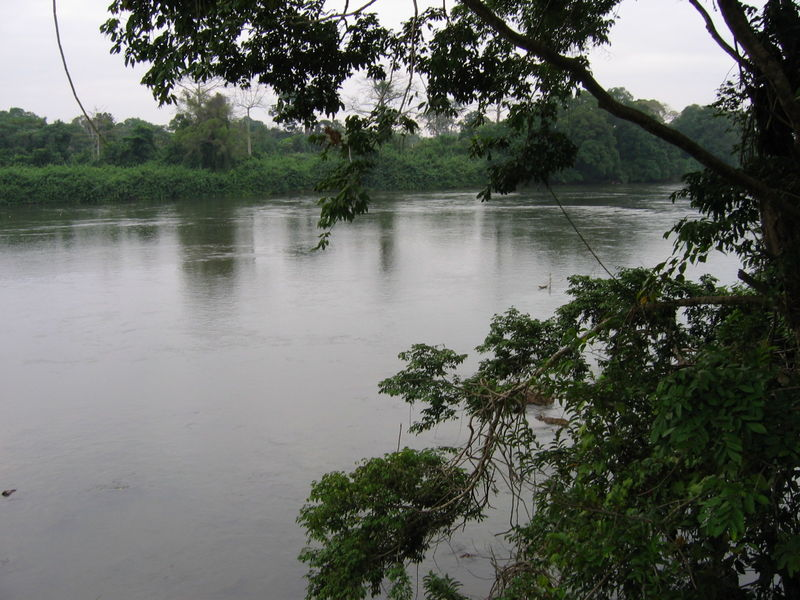
Ngounié River

The Ngounié River, with a basin area of about 33,100 square kilometres (12,800 sq mi), is the second largest tributary of the Ogooué River. It rises in the Chaillu Mountains. For 60 kilometres (37 mi), the river has a south and then west flow, and forms a border with Congo. At the Polo River confluence, it changes direction, heading northwest, before passing through three waterfalls. It then establishes a floodplain within a 220 kilometres (140 mi) valley between the Moukande Mountains and the Massif due Chaillu. After meandering for more than 400 kilometres (250 mi) on the valley floor, it joins the Ogooué prior to Lambaréné. Development in the floodplain occurs mostly in the areas between Lébamba and Mouila, and again from the Fougamou area to the Ogooué at Lambarene. Conservatively, the estimated valley flood land area is approximately 150,000 hectares (370,000 acres). The left bank is characterized by sandy clay soils.

The Ngounié River Valley is formed between the forest-covered Du Chaillu Hills and the Ikoundou Mountains, and has grassy vegetation. The region within this valley is also known as Ngounié.

Its tributaries include Louetsié, which passes through Lébamba and Mbigou; Ikoy, whose main tributary are the Ikobe River and the Oumba River; Dollé, which passes through Ndendé; as well as the Ogoulou, Ngongo and Ovigui rivers. Imperatrice Falls (also known as Samba Falls, or Empress Eugénie Falls), are approximately 10 metres (33 ft) in height. They are located in a river bend in the Ngounié Province, 5 kilometres (3.1 mi) from Fougamou. Here, the Ngounié measures approximately 150 metres (490 ft) in width and contains small islands. This is within the Peneplain Chaillu, which features granite gneiss and hills as well as rocky bays.

== Climate ==
The climate is characterized by its equatorial humidity. The average temperature varies between 23–28 °C (73–82 °F). The relative humidity is commonly greater than 80%. Annual rainfall is measured around 2,000–2,200 millimetres (79–87 in). Wet seasons occur during September–December and March–May.

== Power development ==
The hydro-power potential of the Ngounié River has been proposed to be tapped by a hydroelectric project located on the Empress Eugénie Falls. The project is planned as a 56 MW run-of-the-river scheme with four units 14 MW capacity each. Two additional units of 14 MW have also been planned for completion in 2015, thus taking the total installed capacity of the station to 84 MW. The project utilizes the main Empress Eugénie waterfall of about 12 metres (39 ft) and a series of rapids in a river length of 2,000 metres (6,600 ft), creating a total head of 20 metres (66 ft) for power generation. The geology in the project area consists of granite gneiss formations.

== Bibliography ==
- National Geographic. 2003. African Adventure Atlas Pg 24,72. led by Sean Frase
- Barret, Jacques (1 January 1983). Géographie et cartographie du Gabon: atlas illustré. Editions classiques d'expression francaise. pp. 14–15. ISBN 978-2-85069-301-4.
- Gray, Christopher John (2002). Colonial Rule and Crisis in Equatorial Africa: Southern Gabon, C. 1850-1940. University Rochester Press. p. 108. ISBN 978-1-58046-048-4.
- Hickendorff, Annelies (19 September 2014). Gabon. Bradt Travel Guides. ISBN 978-1-84162-554-6.
- Hughes, R. H.; Hughes, J. S.; Bernacsek, G. M. (1992). A Directory of African Wetlands. IUCN. ISBN 978-2-88032-949-5.
- Warne, Sophie (2003). Gabon, São Tomé and Príncipe. Bradt Travel Guides. ISBN 978-1-84162-073-2.
