= Mount Mimongo =

Mountain in Gabon

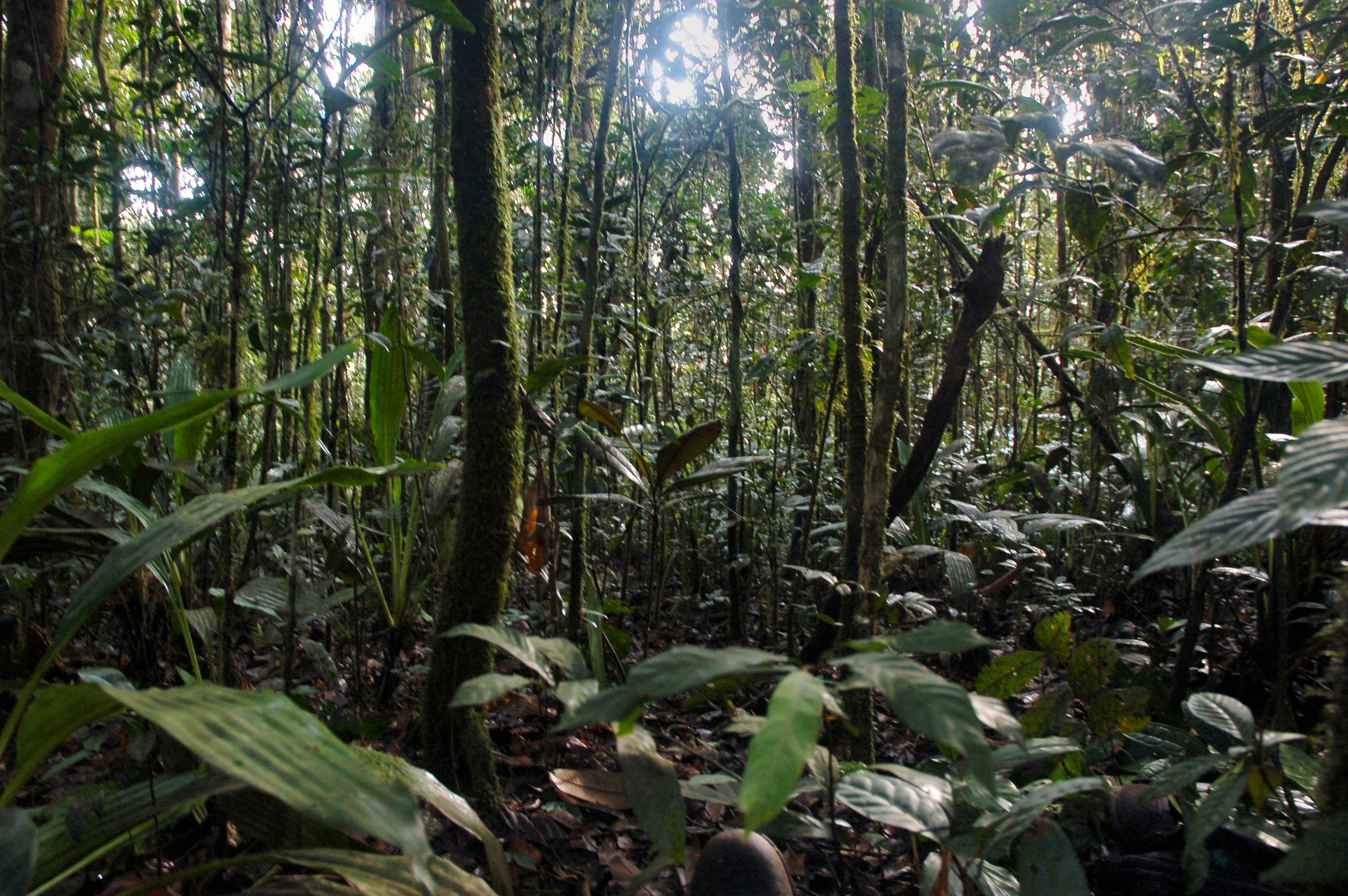
- The summit of Mt Mimongo

Highest point
- Elevation: 860 m (2,820 ft)
- Coordinates: 01°38′51″S 11°45′48″E

Geography
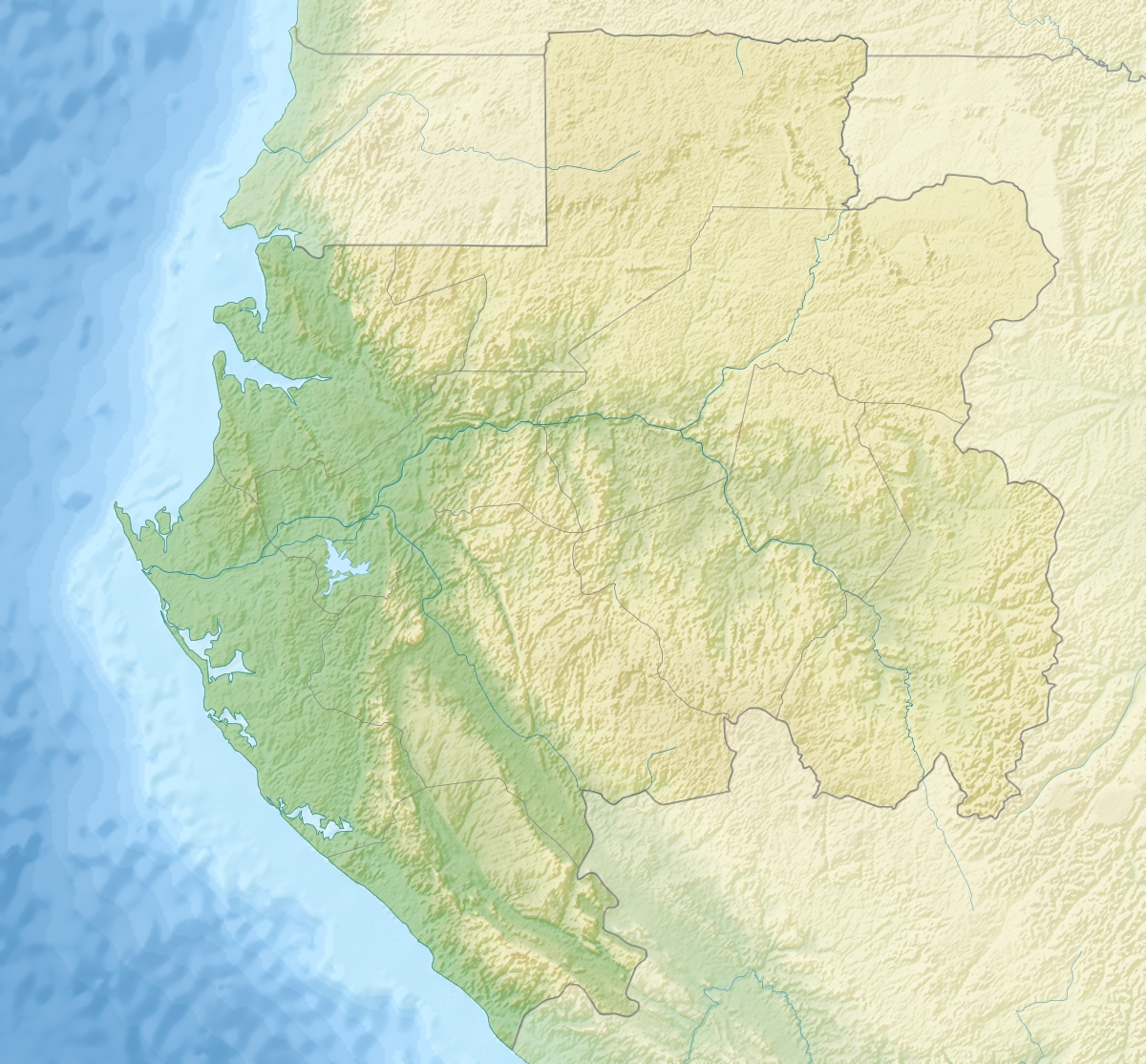
- Location within Gabon
- Country: Gabon
- Province: Ngounié
- Parent range: Chaillu Mountains

Mount Mimongo (locally known as Mt Songo), with an elevation of 860 metres (2,822 ft), is one of the higher mountains in the Chaillu Mountain Range in Gabon. The summit is situated 20 kilometres (12 mi) east of the small town of Mimongo and within a few hours' walk from the village Dibandi. The region was first explored by Paul Du Chaillu between 1855 and 1865.

== Flora ==
Pararistolochia incisiloba (Jongkind) M.E. Leal (Aristolochiaceae) is a plant species endemic to Mt Mimongo and also the only location on mainland Africa where Begonia thomeana C.DC. (Begoniaceae) is found, previously endemic to Sao Tome.
