= Synodontis acanthoperca =

Conservation status
- Data Deficient (IUCN 3.1)

Scientific classification
- Kingdom: Animalia
- Phylum: Chordata
- Class: Actinopterygii
- Order: Siluriformes
- Family: Mochokidae
- Genus: Synodontis
- Species: S. acanthoperca

Binomial name
- Synodontis acanthoperca Friel & Vigliotta, 2006

Species of fish

Synodontis acanthoperca, known as the scissortail synodontis, is a species of upside-down catfish native to Gabon where it occurs in the Ogowe River. It was first described by John P. Friel & Thomas R. Vigliotta in 2006, based upon a holotype discovered in the Ogooué River in Gabon, at and below the Rapids of Massoukou. The specific name "acanthoperca" comes from the Latinized combination of the Greek word acantha, meaning "thorn", and the Latin opercul, meaning cover or lid, which refers to the pronounced spines that develop on the operculum of mature males.

== Description ==
The body of the fish is light colored with six dark patches giving a banded appearance. The ventral side is cream colored in the back with a series of dark bands toward the front, separated by cream colored or light brown bands. The maxillary barbels are dark brown to black, mandibular barbels are cream colored. The tail is milky-colored with a prominent black spot in each of the two lobes just behind the fork of the fin.

Like other members of the genus, this fish has a humeral process, which is a bony spike that is attached to a hardened head cap on the fish and can be seen extending beyond the gill opening. The first ray of the dorsal fin and the pectoral fins have a hardened first ray which is serrated. The caudal fin is deeply forked. It has short, cone-shaped teeth in the upper jaw. In the lower jaw, the teeth are s-shaped and movable. The fish has one pair of long, slender maxillary barbels, extending just beyond the base of the last pectoral fin ray, and two pairs of mandibular barbels that are often branched. The small adipose fin is well developed. Each opercle has a single spine pointing toward the tail that develops based on age and gender of the fish.

This species grows to a length of up to 4.6 centimetres (1.8 in) SL

== Habitat ==
In the wild, the species inhabits tropical waters with a temperature range of 23 to 26 °C (73 to 79 °F), and a pH of 6.5 – 7.0. It has been found in two locations, in the Ogowe River and in the Louetsié River in Gabon.
