= Koulamoutou =

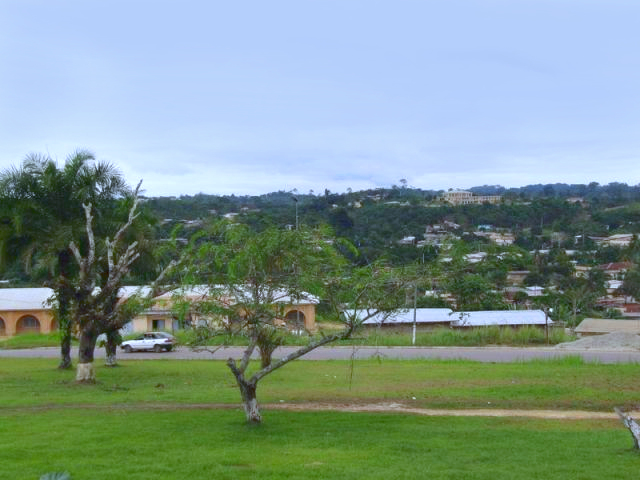

- Coat of arms

- Location in Gabon
- Coordinates: 1°8′S 12°29′E
- Country: Gabon
- Province: Ogooué-Lolo Province

Population
  - Total: 16,000

Koulamoutou is the capital of Ogooué-Lolo Province in east-central Gabon, with a population of around 16,000 people. It lies at the confluence of the Lolo River and the River Bouenguidi and on the N6 road. The town has an airport and had been developed by a Minister of Tourism born in a nearby village.

The town has a museum, a cinema, an airport and is also known for its nightlife. The du Chaillu Mountains and Mbougou Falls lie near Koulamoutou.

== Notable people ==
- Blaise Louembe, politician
