= Bongolo Dam =

Bongolo Dam may refer to:

- Bongolo Dam (South Africa)
- Bongolo Dam (Gabon)
