= Lébamba =

- Town
- Location in Gabon
- Coordinates: 2°12′S 11°30′E
- Country: Gabon
- Province: Ngounié Province
- Department: Louetsi-Wano Department

Lébamba is a small town in south-western Gabon. It is the capital of Louetsi-Wano Department in Ngounié Province. It lies along the N6 road, 38.3 kilometres northeast of Ndendé. A Catholic Mission has long been established in Lébamba.

== Geography ==
Lébamba is located in south-western Gabon, and in the southeast of Ngounié Province. Kanda and Moukoundou lie nearby to the northeast. The Ngounié River flows just to the west of the town and the Louetsi River is also nearby. The land between Lébamba and Mouila is mainly floodplain.

Two kilometres from Lébamba are "massive underground cave networks", known as the Bongolo Caves or Malibé Caves. The caves lie at an altitude of 1150 metres. The Lekindou waterfall is also nearby.

== Economy ==
An agronomical research center was established at Lébamba in the 1960s. Since, the Lébamba Agro-pastoral Project has conducted studies on the socio-economic aspects of livestock production in the region. In the 1970s, an oil mill for processing palm oil was established in Lébamba by the Agro-Gabon Company. In 1981, a two-year, UNDP funded project, Agro-pastoral Development of Lébamba Zone, was developed to study the socio-economic aspects of livestock production in the region. In the same decade, rice based farming systems were established in three villages of the Lébamba region. In 1990, it was noted that a soil conditioner project in Lébamba would continue for a few years as the country's soil has fairly low agricultural fertility.

== Culture ==
The Nzebi people (or Banzebi, or Ndzebi)) live in the area between Lébamba and extending to west of Franceville. Njebi, a Northwest Bantu language, is spoken in Lébamba. The Wumbvu people live in the same province, but to the east of Lébamba; they speak the Wumbvu language and are of a different tribal cluster, that of the Central Congo.

It was reported in 1971 that the Christian and Missionary Alliance opened a bookstore, reading room and youth center in the village. The Bongolo Hospital, which is considered to be one of the best in Gabon, is located in Lébamba. Established in 1977, the hospital is staffed by American missionary doctors and is one of only three hospitals in Gabon that offers HIV testing (the others are the Libreville and Port Gentil Hospitals).

== Transportation ==
In 1993, a bridge financed by the US, Canada and France was announced costing CFA69.280m for construction over the Louetsi River near Lébamba; the total cost of the scheme was estimated at CFA281.745m. The Ndende to Lébamba road was constructed with the assistance of China. An 800 metres (2,600 ft) laterite and grass airstrip services the hospital.
