= Louetsi-Wano (department) =

Coordinates: 2°12′S 11°30′E

- Department
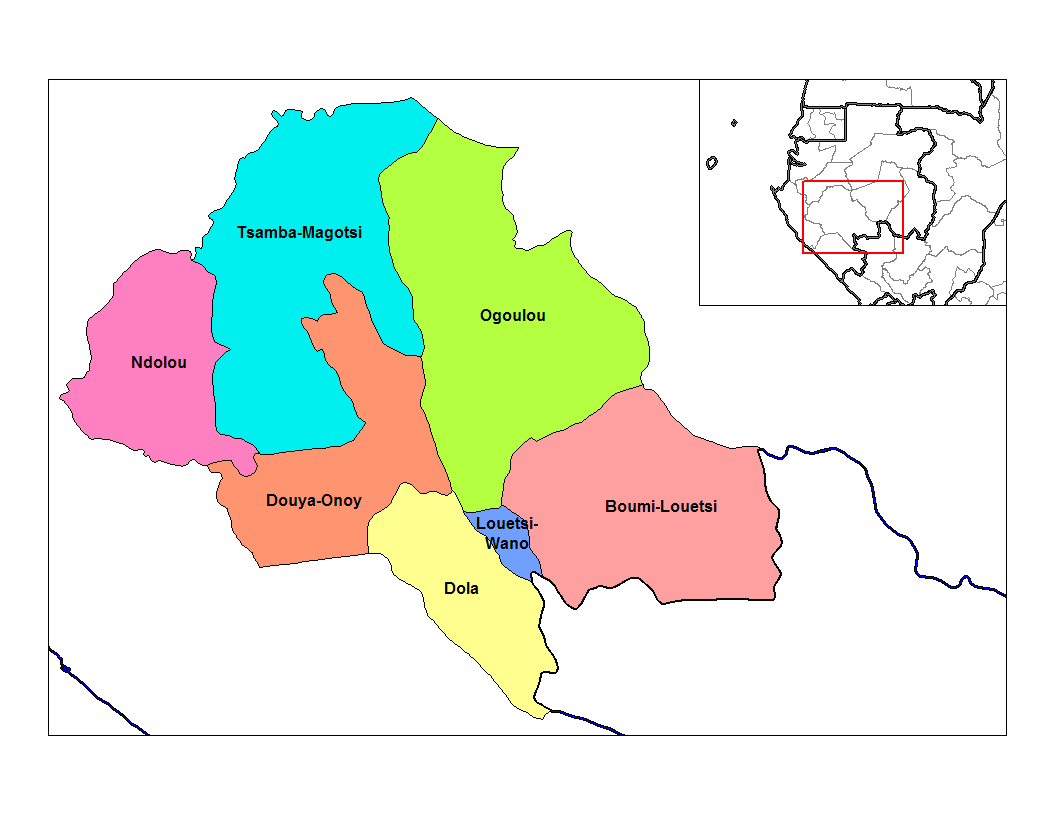
- Louetsi-Wano Department in the region
- Country: Gabon
- Province: Ngounié Province

Population (2013 Census)
  - Total: 9,750
- Time zone: UTC+1 (GMT +1)

Louetsi-Wano is a department of Ngounié Province in south-western Gabon. The capital lies at Lébamba. It had a population of 9,750 in 2013. The average altitude is 116 m (381 ft).

== Towns and villages ==
As of right now, Louetsi-Wano only contains one village, Lébamba. The closest nearby city is Ndendé.
