= Bouinandjé River =

River in Gabon

The Bouinandjé River is a river of Gabon. It is one of the tributaries of the Ivindo River.
