= Maulongo =

Village in Gabon

Maulongo is a Gabonese village on the Ogooue River.

It is located in Haut-Ogooué near the Poubara Falls.
