= Zadié River =

Location
- Country: Gabon

Physical characteristics
- Source
  - coordinates: 0°46′16″N 14°19′30″E
- Mouth: Ivindo River
  - coordinates: 0°45′48″N 12°57′57″E

Basin features
- River system: Ogooué River

The Zadié river (French: Rivière Zadie) is a tributary of the Ivindo river in northeastern Gabon.
