= Ndouna Dépénaud =

Gabonese writer (1937–1977)

- Born: Dieudonné Pascal Ndouna Okogo; 7 July 1937; Akiéni, Haut-Ogooué, Gabon
- Died: 19 July 1977 (aged 40); Libreville, Gabon
- Occupations: Writer, poet, playwright, educator, diplomat

Dieudonné Pascal Ndouna Okogo, known as Ndouna Dépénaud, was a Gabonese writer, poet, playwright, educator, and diplomat, born on 7 July 1937, in Akiéni, Haut-Ogooué province in the southeast of the country, and assassinated on 19 July 1977, in Libreville.

== Biography ==
=== Death ===
Ndouna Dépénaud was assassinated on 19 July 1977, near his home in the Akébé neighborhood in Libreville. According to Pierre Péan, Ndouna Dépénaud had reportedly married Marie-Joséphine Kama, also known as Patience Dabany, in a customary union, who later became the wife of Omar Bongo, President of Gabon. For the French journalist, the death of the Gabonese poet was linked to this past relationship with Omar Bongo's wife. Although the assassination of Ndouna Dépénaud remains unresolved, he is said to have been "cold-bloodedly murdered" by three members of the presidential guard. Placide Ondo also mentioned rumors of a crime of passion involving Ndouna Dépénaud and Josephine Kama. Jeune Afrique magazine indicates that Ndouna Dépénaud was an opponent of Omar Bongo's regime.

== Works ==
Ndouna Dépénaud published two collections of poetry:

- Passages. Poetic Essays, Libreville, National Pedagogical Institute, 1969.
- Rêves à l'aube (Dreams at Dawn), Libreville, National Pedagogical Institute, 1975.

Dépénaud also published a four-act play, La Plaie (The Wound). He expressed his love for writing and especially for poetry in these words: "I cannot say how or why I came to poetry. An essentially literary education, a particular taste for the marvelous, and a very sensitive nature must have led me to poetry... Why poetry? Simply because I have a fundamentally Negro soul, and poetry is the literary form that suits the expression of the Negro soul, imbued with sensitivity".

In his anthology of Gabonese poets, Eric Joël Bekale notes that Ndouna Dépénaud was "the best-known Gabonese writer of the seventies".

Ndouna Dépénaud's work is well-represented in anthologies of Gabonese literature. Literary critic Fortunat Obiang notes that "Ndouna Dépénaud favors themes that sufficiently indicate that his writing is on the margins of the lyrical protest inherent in Negritude".

== Bibliography ==
- "M. Ndouna Dépénaud n'est plus". L'Union. No. 472. 21 July 1977.
- Fortunat Obiang Essono (April–June 1991). "Lire Ndouna Dépénaud". Notre Librairie. No. 105. pp. 112–113.
