= Monte Temelón Natural Reserve =

Coordinates: 2.02°N 10.73°E

Monte Temelon Natural Reserve
- IUCN category IV (habitat/species management area)

Monte Temelon Natural Reserve (Spanish: Reserva natural del Monte Temelón) spans 230.00 km^{2}, and is situated in the Río Muni region of Equatorial Guinea. It was established in 2000. This site is 1283 km^{2}.

The relief of this plateau is quite homogeneous and although some areas such as this one of the Temelón mountains stand out, the sensation of peneplain is not lost. Undoubtedly, one of the outstanding elements of the area is its still abundant fauna that has been found in this refuge area from the degradation of the forests of the entire region. highlights the presence of: Gorillas Pan gorilla, Chimpacés p. troglodytes, Boar potamuchoerus porcus, mandrels M. sphinx, Sitatunga T. spekei, geroglifico T. Scriptus.
