= Ogoulou River =

Watercourse in Gabon

Coordinates: 2°01′28″S 11°19′04″E

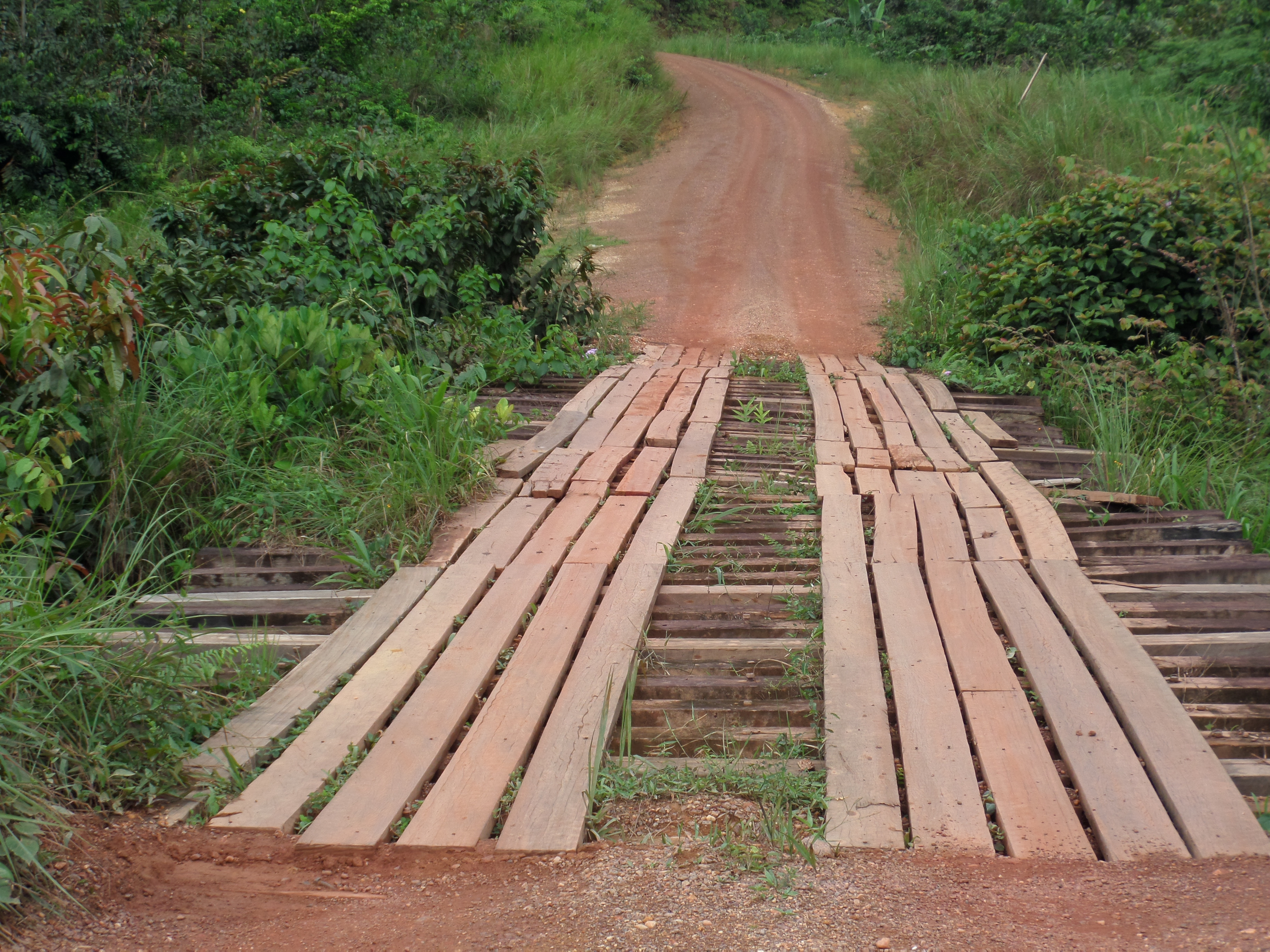
Bridge over the Ogoulou

The Ogoulou River is in Gabon. It is a tributary of the Ngounié River. Yengué is by it.

Paul Belloni Du Chaillu wrote about it. He reported plantations of groundnuts bordering it.

== See also ==
- List of rivers of Gabon
- Ogoulou (department)
