= Jean-Marie Adzé =

Gabonese politician and diplomat

Jean-Marie Adzé (born January 1956) is a Gabonese politician and former diplomat. He was Gabon's Ambassador to France from 2002 to 2008 and has been Mayor of Akiéni since 2008.

== Political career ==
Adzé was born in Akiéni. He was adviser to the Director-General of the National Bank of Rural Credit from 1989 to 1991 before being appointed as Deputy Director of the Presidential Cabinet, in charge of Administrative and Political Affairs, in 1991. He was also a leader of the Association of Democrat Renovators, along with Emmanuel Ondo Methogo, in the early 1990s.

Adzé retained his post as Deputy Director of the Presidential Cabinet for a decade, although his responsibilities were reduced to only administrative affairs in 1998. On 8 January 2002, he was appointed as Gabon's Ambassador to France, replacing Honorine Dossou Naki; he presented his credentials as Ambassador to France on 20 February 2002. While posted in Paris, he was also accredited as Ambassador to Portugal and Switzerland.

Following the April 2008 local elections, he was elected as Mayor of Akiéni and Félicité Ongouori Ngoubili was appointed to succeed him as Ambassador to France on 6 June 2008.
