= Karangwa River =

River in Gabon

The Karangwa is a river of Gabon. It is one of the tributaries of the Ivindo River.
