= Djoua River =

River in Gabon

The Djoua in the Ogooue basin (Top right)

The Djoua River is a tributary of the Ivindo River in Gabon and the Republic of the Congo.

The river arises in the Congo and flows west, forming part of the international boundary between the two countries. Fishing is a common activity, and the river has been rumoured to be a path for ivory trafficking.

The river is one of the major tributaries of the Ogooué River, the 4th largest river in Africa by flow volume after the Congo, Niger and Zambezi rivers.
