= Lekoni River =

River in Gabon

Coordinates: 1°11′S 13°16′E

The Lekoni River (French: Rivière Lékoni) is a river in Gabon. It passes through Akieni and Lekoni.

The Leconi river rises in the Batéké Plateau near the border with the Republic of Congo. It is a tributary of the Ogooue River.

Its own tributary is the Lekey River.
