= Luc Marat Abyla =

Gabonese politician

Luc Marat Abyla is a Gabonese politician. He is a member of the Gabonese Democratic Party (Parti démocratique gabonais, PDG), and is a Deputy in the National Assembly of Gabon. Currently he is the President of the PDG Parliamentary Group.
