= Leyou River =

Stream in Gabon

The Leyou River is a river of Gabon. It is one of the tributaries of the Ogooué.
