= Wagny River =

River in Gabon

Coordinates: 0.5697°S 12.3207°E

The Wagny River is a river of Gabon. It is one of the tributaries of the Ogooué River.
