= Moukalaba River =

River in Gabon

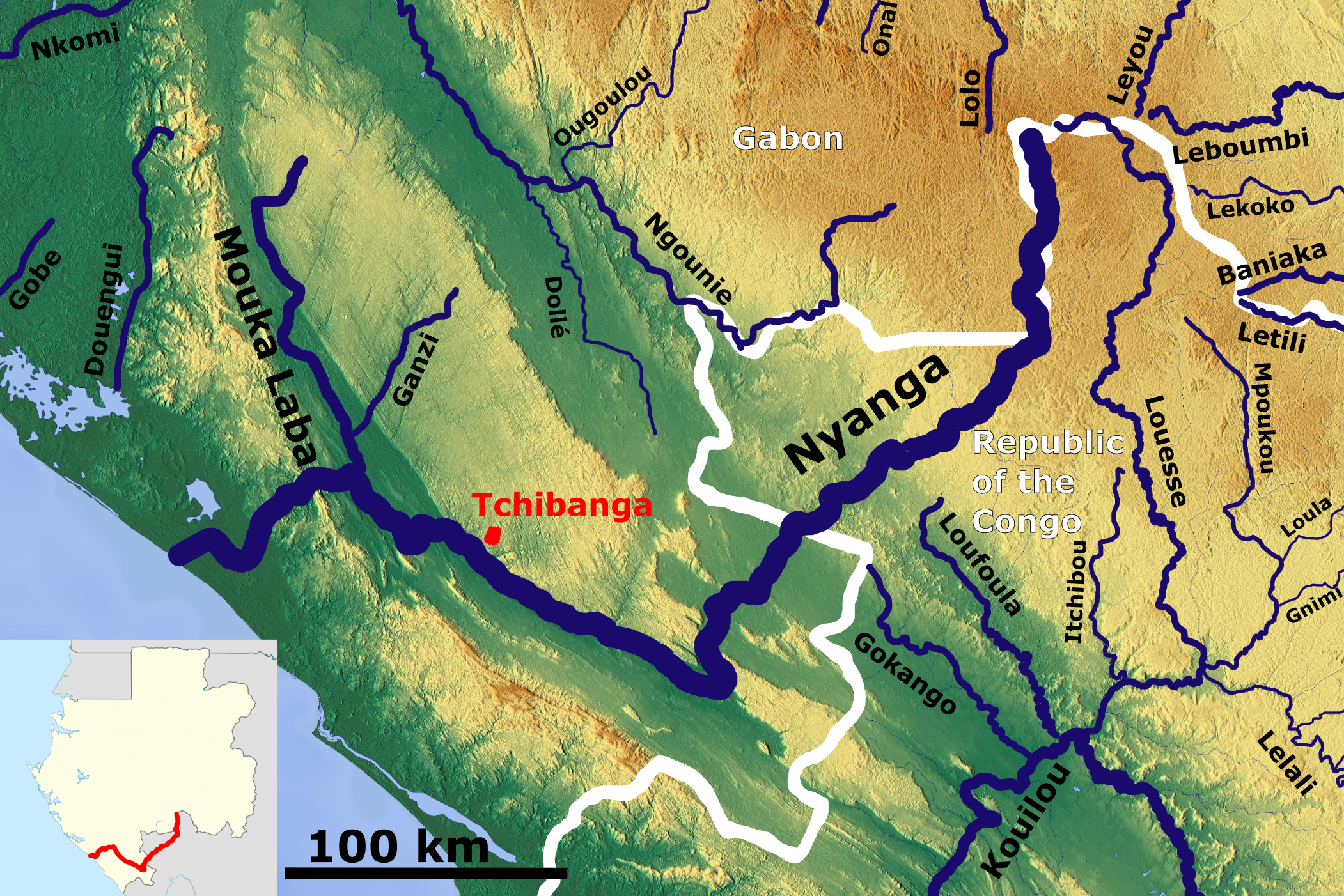
Nyanga River basin

The Moukalaba River is a river in Gabon. It is one of the tributaries of the Nyanga River.
