= Crystal Mountain (Egypt) =

Ridge located within the White Desert

Coordinates: 27.6620°N 28.4293°E

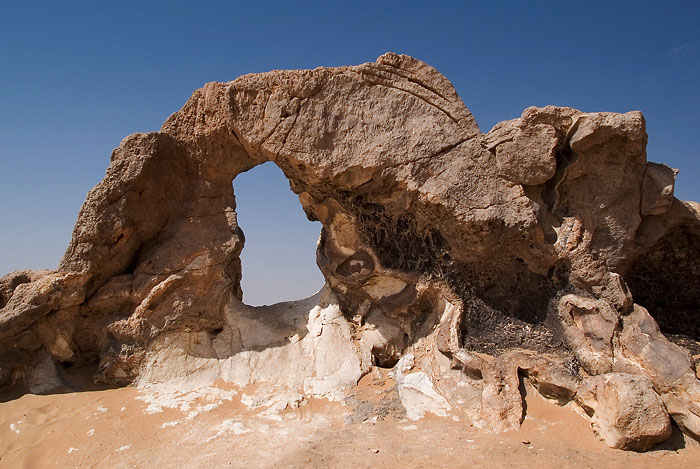
Crystal Mountain in 2005

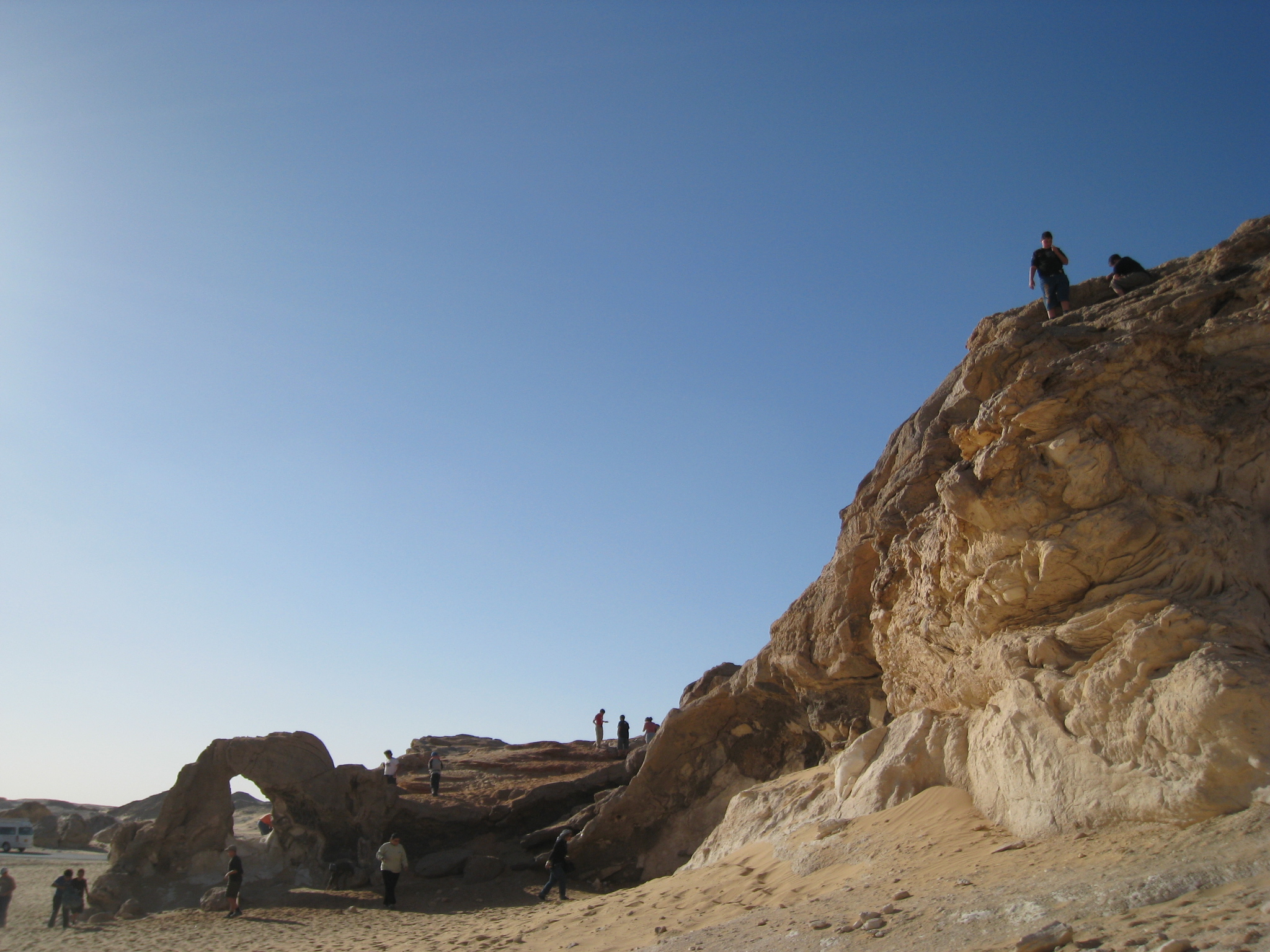
Crystal Mountain in 2007

The Crystal Mountain is a ridge located within the White Desert, 120 km from Farafra, between the Bahariya Oasis and the Farafra depression.

== Geology ==
Crystal Mountain is a small arch made of primarily baryte and calcite crystals found within eroded chalk limestone. The formation process of the crystals is similar to how desert roses are formed, along with both having similar compositions of barite and calcite. Many websites incorrectly refer to the crystals as being made of quartz, though studies have shown that the hardness of the crystals is about 3.0 or 3.5 which is closer to barite and calcite.
