= Mbine River =

River in Gabon

The Mbine River is a river of Gabon. It is one of the tributaries of the Ogooué.
