= Okano River =

River in Gabon

Coordinates: 0.29734°N 11.15609°E

The Okano River is a river of Gabon. It is one of the tributaries of the Ogooué River.
