= Lolo River =

River in Gabon

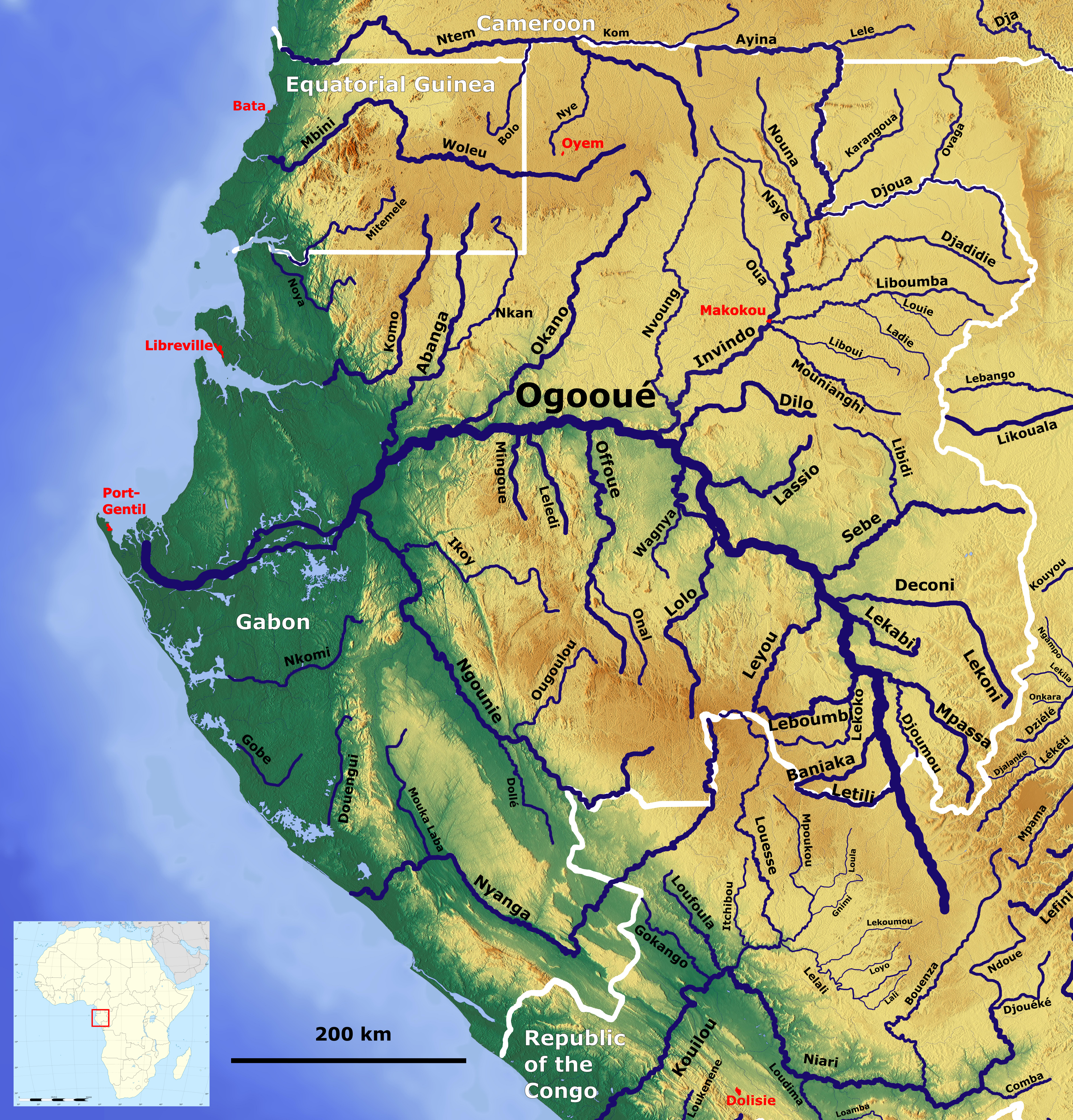

The Lolo River (French: Rivière Lolo) is a river in Gabon, and one tributary of the Ogooué River.

It rises in the Chaillu Mountains. Then, it receives water of its main tributary Bouenguidi past Koulamoutou, Ogooué-Lolo.
