= Batéké Plateau =

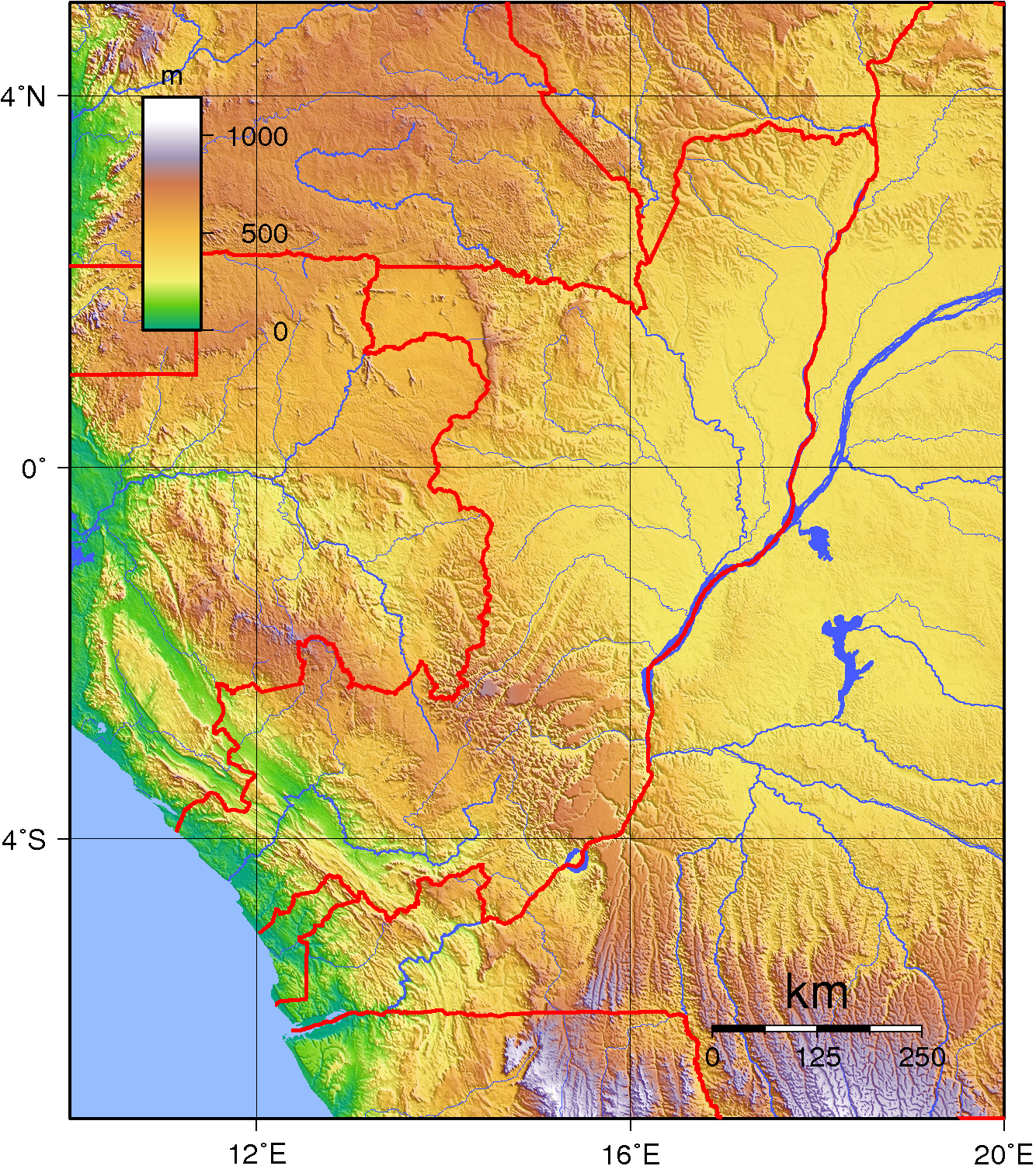
Topographic map of the Republic of the Congo, Brazzaville

The Batéké Plateau is located around the border between the Republic of Congo and Gabon. In both countries, it gave name to administrative departments:

- Plateaux Department in Haut-Ogooué Province, Gabon
- Plateaux Department, which is a first-level subdivision in Congo.

The plateau reaches elevations between 550 and 830 metres, and is rich in manganese. The Bateke Plateau is an ancient volcanic area.

Several rivers rise in that area, including the Niari River, which flows in Congo, the Ogooue, Mpassa, Ndjoumou, Lekabi and Lekey Rivers which flow in Gabon.

== See also ==
- Batéké Plateau National Park
