= Lassio River =

River in Gabon

The Lassio River is a river of Gabon. It is one of the tributaries of the Ogooué.
