= Letili River =

River in Gabon

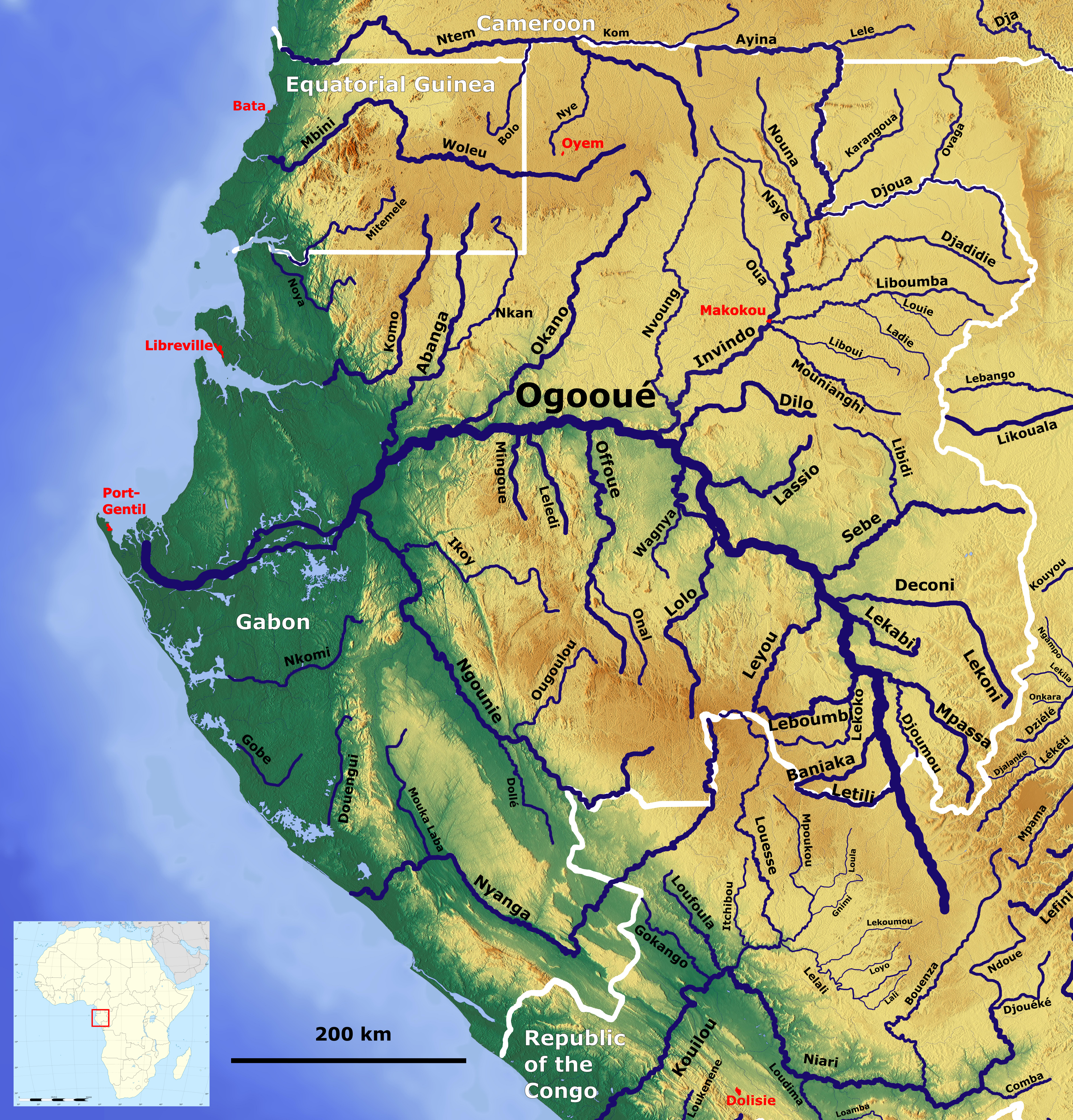
Map of Gabon rivers

The Letili River is a river of Gabon. It is one of the tributaries of the Ogooué.
