= Mpassa River =

River in Gabon

Coordinates: 1°36′52″S 13°33′11″E

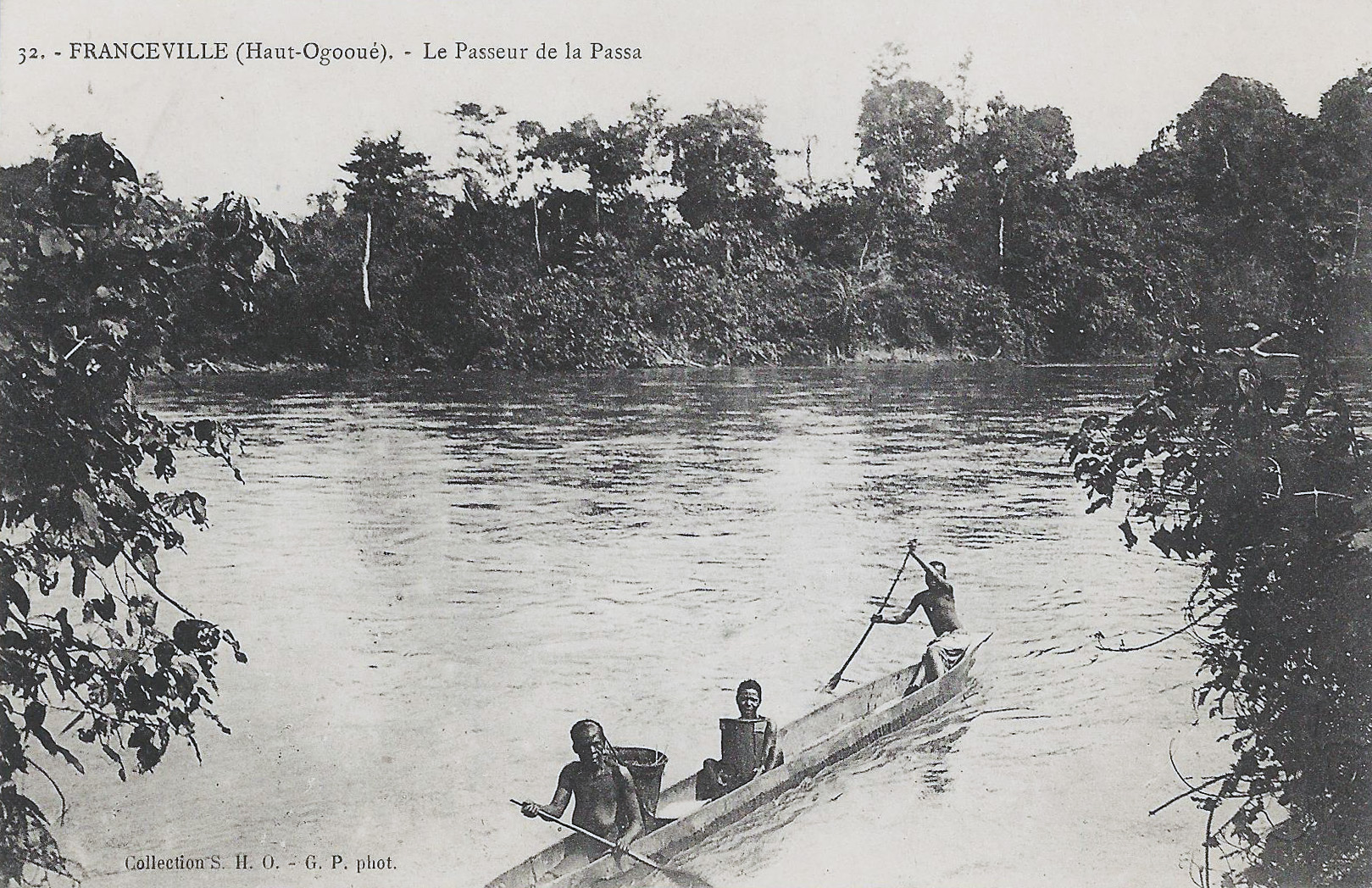
Mpassa River at Franceville around 1900

The Mpassa River (French: Rivière Mpassa) is a tributary of the Ogooue River.

It flows in Gabon, and passes through Franceville. Its main tributary is the Ndjoumou River. The Mpassa River rises in the Bateke Plateau near the border with the Republic of the Congo.

== Bibliography ==
- Maria Petringa, Brazza, A Life for Africa. Bloomington, IN: AuthorHouse, 2006. ISBN 978-1-4259-1198-0
