= Nyanga River =

River in Central Africa

Coordinates: 2°58.0′S 10°15′E

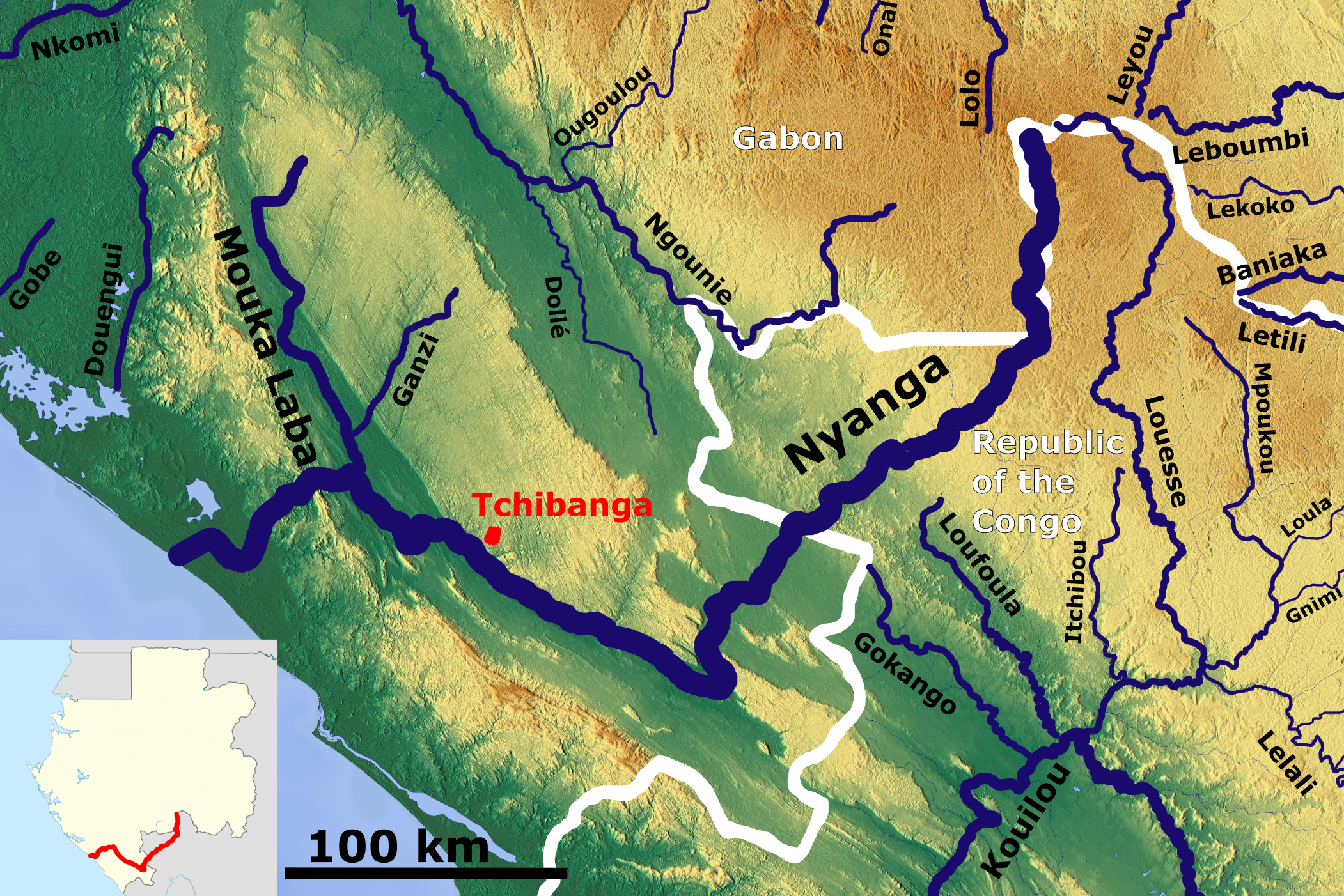
Nyanga River basin

The Nyanga River, 600 km, (French: Rivière Nyanga) is a river that runs through southern Gabon and northern Republic of the Congo. It is the second most important river in Gabon after the Ogooue. It is well known for the numerous rapids that break up its otherwise smooth course.

== Course ==
It rises on the border between the two countries, near the juncture of N'Gounié and Ogooué-Lolo provinces of Gabon, runs south along the border and then southwest through the Niari province of Congo, then enters the Nyanga province of Gabon and makes a sharp bend to the northwest. It passes through Nyanga's capital Tchibanga (the largest city on the river), then gradually bends around to the southwest again, running through a series of rapids before coming out onto a coastal plain and emptying into the Atlantic Ocean.

== Tributaries ==
- Moukalaba, which receives water of its own tributary, the Ganzi River
- Douli
