= Batéké Plateau National Park =

National park in Gabon

- IUCN category II (national park)
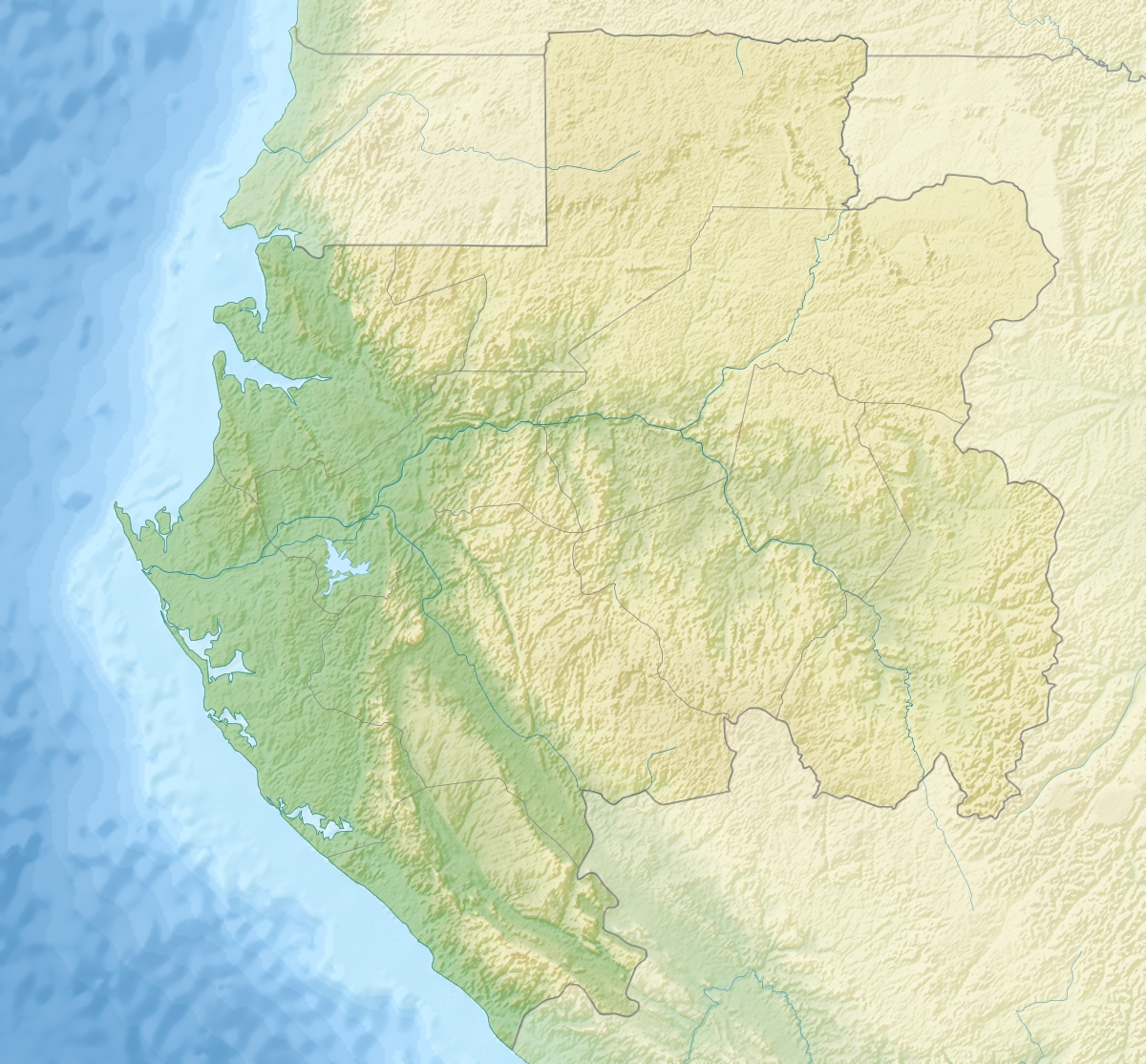
- Location within Gabon
- Location: Haut-Ogooué Province, Gabon
- Coordinates: 2.188°S 14.02°E
- Area: 2,034 km^{2} (785 sq mi)
- Established: 2002
- Governing body: National Agency for National Parks

Batéké Plateau National Park (French: Parc National des Plateaux Batéké) is a national park on the Bateke Plateau, southeastern Gabon covering 2,034 km^{2} (785 sq mi). Due to its purported universal cultural and natural significance, it was added onto the UNESCO World Heritage Tentative List on October 20, 2005.

The Bateke Plateau Forest Savanna depicts the landscape of Central Africa. This national park harbours a rich biodiversity.

== Fauna ==
In 2015, a single male lion was recorded in the park. Genetic analysis of his hair samples revealed that he is closely related to historical lion specimens from this area and the neighbouring Republic of the Congo, which grouped with Panthera leo melanochaita samples from Namibia and Botswana.

Commercial hunting on the plateau in order to satisfy the markets in Congo and Gabon, especially large mammals, is a significant threat to the local fauna.

== See also ==
- Wildlife of Gabon
