= Crystal Mountain (British Columbia) =

Former ski resort in British Columbia, Canada

Coordinates: 49°52′52.83″N 119°42′40.34″W

Crystal Mountain Resort was a day-use ski area near West Kelowna, British Columbia, Canada. It operated two chairlifts and one surface lift: a GMD Mueller double chair, a Poma triple chair, and a Doppelmayr T-bar. The ski area had 30 designated groomed runs and the resort also featured many different tree trails and some glades. Despite the smaller size of the resort, which was considerably smaller than neighbouring resorts such as Big White Ski Resort and Silver Star Mountain Resort, the mountain was a good size and a popular destination for both experienced and first-time skiers, snowboarders and snowshoers. Despite the lower elevation, the area receives heavy snowfall each year with many powder days throughout the winter season. It was long known as Last Mountain Ski Resort but changed its name to Crystal Mountain Resort in 1992. Crystal Mountain Resort offered lessons for skiing and snowboarding and also offered rentals for snowshoeing. It has not been in operation since 2014 due to a lift malfunction of the red double chair.

The ski resort was originally opened on December 9, 1967 by Pat and Allan McLeod under the name of Last Mountain Ski Resort. Mount Last rises to the highest elevation above the resort area and was named in 1967 after Herbert and Charlotte Last, an English couple who had owned the land now occupied by the resort since 1909 and ran the general store and post office in Westbank, British Columbia. In the first year of operation, the resort sold 150 family ski passes. In the early days, there was a teahouse at the top of the main lift the Blue doublechair. It was open during the summer for the first three years. A ski school club was created for young skiers. The resort later was passed to John Barley and in 1992 it was sold to the Tschanz family from Lenzerheide, Switzerland, and the company name was changed to Crystal Mountain Resorts Ltd. The name was changed to Crystal Mountain Resort to remind people of the snow, something bright and fun. The operation consisted of 70 seasonal jobs. The resort offered night skiing from the beginning until the early 2000s, when the resort switched to day operations only. At the 30th anniversary of the resort, in 1997, there was a discussion started regarding the development of the resort with a year-round expansion, based on its location as the closest hill to Kelowna and as the closest Okanagan ski resort to Vancouver.

Crystal Mountain Resort is located in the Okanagan region of British Columbia with the nearest large city being Kelowna. The ski resort itself is located north of Glenrosa, on the mountains above Westbank, West of Kelowna. The ski area base is located at the upper terminus of the Glenrosa Road, which runs from Highway 97 up the mountain to the ski resort area. The Glenrosa interchange was rebuilt in the late 1990s and provides easy access from the nearby Coquihalla Connector, or Highway 97c, connecting Vancouver and the Lower Mainland through West Kelowna to Kelowna.

The site of Crystal Mountain Resort is approximately 9 kilometres west of the City of West Kelowna (which provided an existing infrastructure and an existing capable workforce).

The top elevation is 1,440 m (4,724 ft) with a vertical drop of 212 m (700 ft) coming to a base elevation of 1,228 m (4,024 ft). The runs are composed of the following levels of difficulty: 30% Novice, 50% Intermediate and 20% Advanced.
