= Kengue =

Nkisi Spirit

Kengue (derived from the Kongo word Kanga, meaning "to bind"), also known as Tiembla Tierra ("Earth Shaker" in Spanish) in Latin America, is one of the most important of all nkisi. Kengue is the Sky Father and the primordial creator of all life.

== See also ==
- Obatala - The orisha syncretized with this deity.
