= Bongolo Dam (Gabon) =

Dam in Gabon

The Bongolo Dam is a dam on the Louetsi River in southwestern Gabon, near Bongolo. The dam was built in the early 1990s with Canadian investment. In 2020, it was announced that the dam was going to be refurbished by Société d’énergie et d’eau du Gabon, with five faulty turbines being replaced and the renewal of the safety and security equipment.
