= Adané =

- Location in Gabon
- Coordinates: 0°36′0″S 10°13′46.4″E
- Country: Gabon
- Province: Moyen-Ogooué Province
- Department: Ogooué et des Lacs Department

Adané is a small town in the Ogooué et des Lacs Department, Moyen-Ogooué Province, in northwestern Gabon. It lies near the Ogooue River about 20 kilometres north of Lambaréné, and about 12 kilometres north of Nzorbang.

The N1 road connects the town to Lambaréné across the Mbiné river.
