= Bouenguidi =

River in Gabon

Coordinates: 1°08′S 12°29′E

The Bouenguidi River (French: Rivière Bouenguidi) is a river in Gabon. It enters the Lolo River. The Bouenguidi River passes through Koulamoutou.

Its main tributary is the Lebiyou River.
