= Sebe River =

River in Gabon

The Sébé (or Sebe) River (French: Rivière Sébé) is a river which flows in Gabon.

It is a tributary of the Ogooue River, and passes through Okondja, Haut-Ogooué. Its own tributaries are the Loula River and the Lebiri River.
