= Ikoy River =

Stream in Gabon

Map

The Ikoy, also Dcoye, (French: Rivière Ikoy) is a river of central-western Gabon. It is a tributary of the Ngounié River and flows into the river to the southeast of Lambaréné. It flows through the districts of Matèndè, Dibuwa, and Okobi and the banks are inhabited by Tsogo-speaking clans. The river is believed to be inhabited by a strange creature named a N’yamala, a dinosaur-like creature over 30 ft (9.1 m). Fang witch doctor Michel Obiang reported seeing it in 1946 near its confluence with the Ngounié River. Tributaries include the Ikobe and the Oumba. Geologically the Ikoy Fault is a defined fault in this area of Gabon.
