= Lekabi River =

River in Gabon

The Lekabi River is a river of Gabon and one of the tributaries of the Ogooué.
