= Baniaka River =

River in Gabon

Coordinates: 1.97056°S 13.54472°E

The Baniaka River is a river of Gabon. It is one of the tributaries of the Ogooué.
