= Lékoni, Gabon =

Lekoni
- Lékoni
- Location in Gabon
- Coordinates: 1°35′S 14°4′E
- Country: Gabon
- Province: Haut-Ogooué Province

Lékoni is a town in south eastern Gabon, lying east of Bongoville on the Lekoni River, surrounded by the Batéké Plateau. It is known for the Léconi Canyons (actually craters) and Léconi Park, a private wildlife park also involved in agriculture.
