= Tsogo language =

Bantu language spoken in Gabon

Tsogo
- Ghetsogho
- Native to: Gabon
- Ethnicity: Mitsogho, Bongo Pygmies
- Native speakers: 9,000 (2007)
- Language family: Niger–Congo?: Atlantic–Congo; Benue–Congo; Bantoid; Bantu (Zone B); Tsogo languages (B.30); Tsogo

Language codes
- ISO 639-3: tsv
- Glottolog: tsog1243
- Guthrie code: B.31

Tsogo (Getsogo) is a Bantu language of Gabon. It is one of the principal languages of the Babongo Pygmies.
