= Louetsié River =

River in Gabon

The Louetsi is a river of southwestern Gabon, flowing through Ngounié Province. It flows through Bongolo and the Bongolo Dam on the river provides hydroelectric power to the lower third of Gabon. In 1993, a bridge financed by the US, Canada and France was announced costing CFA69.280m for construction over the Louetsi near Lébamba. The total cost of the scheme was estimated at CFA281.745m.
