= Paul Du Chaillu =

French-American anthropologist, zoologist and traveler

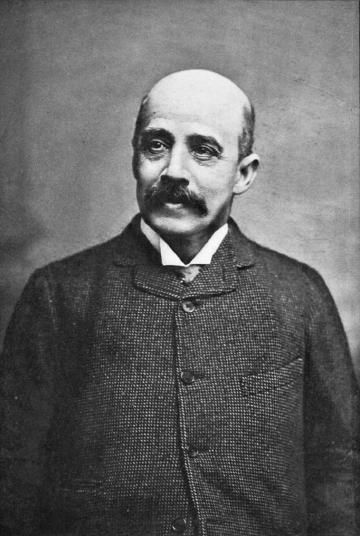
- Born: July 31, 1831/1835/1839
- Died: April 16/29, 1903; St. Petersburg, Russia
- Occupations: Explorer, anthropologist
- Known for: "Discovery" of gorilla, Pygmy people

Signature
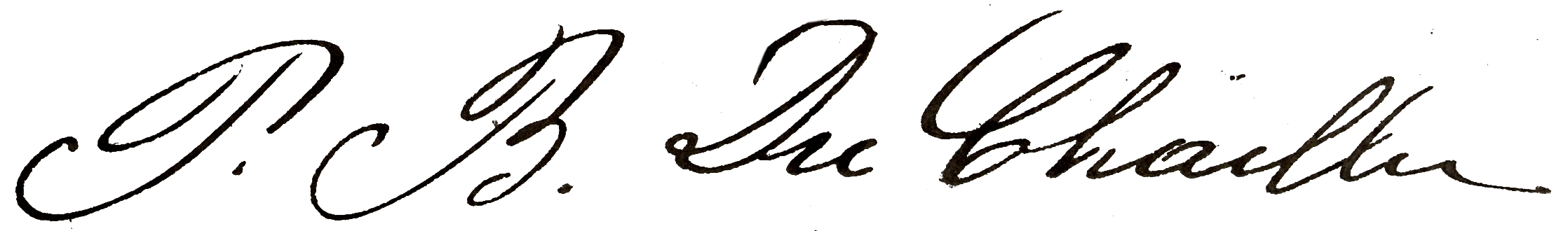

Paul Belloni Du Chaillu (July 31, 1831 (disputed) – April 29, 1903) was a French-American traveler, zoologist, and anthropologist. He became famous in the 1860s as the first modern European outsider to confirm the existence of gorillas, and later the Pygmy people of central Africa. He later researched the prehistory of Scandinavia.

== Early life and parentage ==
There are conflicting reports of both the year and place of Du Chaillu's birth. The year is variously given as 1831 (the consensus of modern scholars), 1835, or 1839; the date when given is July 31. Accounts usually cite either Paris or New Orleans as his likely place of birth. A contemporary obituary quotes a statement made by Du Chaillu referring to "the United States, my country by adoption, and ... France, my native land." His entry in the 1901-1902 edition of Marquis Who's Who — which was based on information he supplied directly to the editors — says 1838 in New Orleans. His grave marker identifies his place of birth as Louisiana, and the year as 1839.

Edward Clodd, Du Chaillu's friend, told the story differently in his memoirs. Clodd mentioned New York as another claimed location, but asserted that Du Chaillu's true birthplace was the French Indian Ocean island territory of Île Bourbon (now called Réunion). He further claimed that du Chaillu's mother was a mulatto woman. In 1979, historian Henry H. Bucher presented evidence to back Clodd's view, including records of Du Chaillu's father. Bucher argued that Du Chaillu, as a member of the European scientific community, would have tried to obfuscate or conceal the family history that would have labeled him a quadroon. In the 19th century atmosphere of scientific racism, great apes and Sub-Saharan Africans were often considered to both have small cranial capacity, and thus be innately unable to achieve civilization; Du Chaillu's credibility as a scientist and explorer would have suffered as a result. Indeed, comments in a letter by Du Chaillu's contemporary, the ethnologist of Africa Mary Kingsley, indicate that at least some scientists who thought poorly of Du Chaillu knew of his ancestry or other information presumed to be disqualifying.

In his youth, he accompanied his father, a French trader in the employment of a Parisian firm, to the west coast of Africa where, at a station on the Gabon, he was educated by missionaries and acquired an interest in and knowledge of the country, its natural history, its natives, and their languages before emigrating to the U.S. in 1852.

== Africa ==
He was sent in 1855 by the Academy of Natural Sciences at Philadelphia on an African expedition. Until 1859, he explored the regions of West Africa in the neighborhood of the equator, gaining considerable knowledge of the delta of the Ogooué River and the estuary of the Gabon. During his travels from 1856 to 1859, he observed numerous gorillas, known to non-locals in prior centuries only from an unreliable and ambiguous report credited to Hanno the Navigator of Carthage in the 5th century BC and known to scientists in the preceding years only by a few skeletons. He brought back dead specimens and presented himself as the first white European person to have seen them.

A subsequent expedition, from 1863 to 1865, enabled him to confirm the accounts given by the ancients of a pygmy people inhabiting the African forests. Du Chaillu sold his hunted gorillas to the Natural History Museum in London. His efforts to keep captive baby gorilla infants alive were unsuccessful, as the infants proved to be "morose," "ill-tempered," and subject to "a feeling of revenge." He sold his "cannibal skulls" to other European collections; a fine cased group shot by Du Chaillu may be seen in the Ipswich Museum in Suffolk, England.

Narratives of both expeditions were published, in 1861 and 1867 respectively, under the titles Explorations and Adventures in Equatorial Africa, with Accounts of the Manners and Customs of the People, and of the Chace of the Gorilla, Crocodile, and other Animals; and A Journey to Ashango-land, and further penetration into Equatorial Africa. While in Ashango Land in 1865, he was elected King of the Apingi tribe. A later narrative, The Country of the Dwarfs was published in 1872.

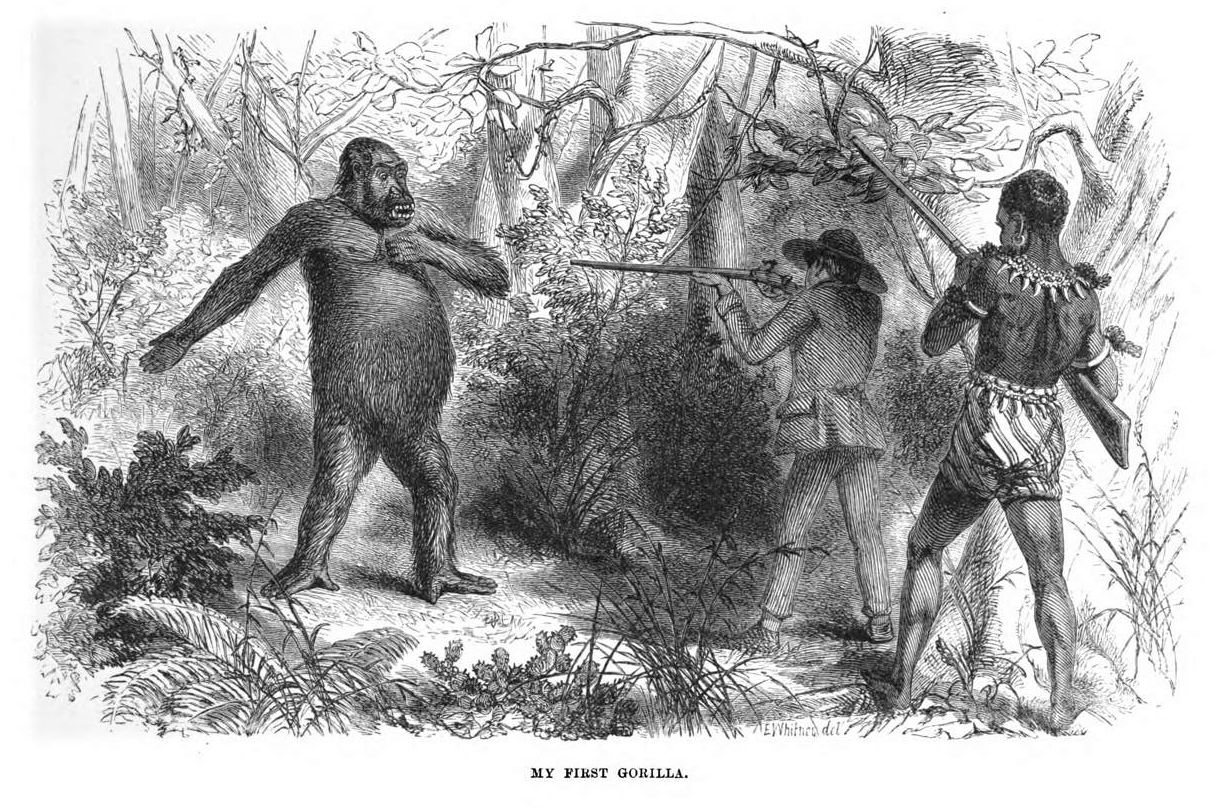
Drawing of Du Chaillu at close quarters with a gorilla

At the time, he was in great demand on the public lecture circuits of New York, London, and Paris. Although there were initial challenges of his accounts, they came to be accepted, although Encyclopædia Britannica speculated that "possibly some of the adventures he described as happening to himself were reproductions of the hunting stories of natives."

In addition to his zoological work on gorillas, Du Chaillu collected and identified a number of new species to science. He was the first person to scientifically describe the giant otter shrew (Potamogale velox), taking precedence over John Edward Gray's description of the same animal as a mouse instead. He also collected the type specimens for the southern needle-clawed bushbaby (Euoticus elegantulus), the hammer-headed bat (Hypsignathus monstrosus), and the African pygmy squirrel (Myosciurus pumilio), all West African species. Despite not being an ornithological collector, he collected the types specimens for thirty-nine valid species of African birds. Du Chaillu collected the type series of Amnirana albolabris (Hallowell, 1856) from Gabon.

== Northern Europe ==
After some years' residence in America, during which he wrote several books for the young based on his African adventures, Du Chaillu turned his attention to northern Europe. After a visit to northern Norway in 1871, over the following five years, he made a study of customs and antiquities in Sweden, Norway, Lapland and Northern Finland. He published in 1881 The Land of the Midnight Sun (dedicated to his friend Robert Winthrop of New York), as a series of Summer and Winter Journeys, in two volumes.

His 1889 work The Viking Age, also in two volumes, was a very broad study of the early history, manners, and customs of the ancestors of the English-speaking nations. He labored for eight and a half years and carefully read hundreds of Sagas that describe the life of the people who inhabited the Scandinavian Peninsula from the Stone Age to the Middle Ages (including literary remains). This scholarly work demonstrates what is now generally recognized, the importance of the Norse, including Norway, Sweden, and Denmark to the cultural dimension and transformation of British Isles during the fifth to eleventh centuries. This view was then unfamiliar and was ridiculed by many of his contemporaries, including Canon Isaac Taylor. This book, in two volumes, is now a very collectible item. In 1900, he also published The Land of the Long Night.

== Personal life ==
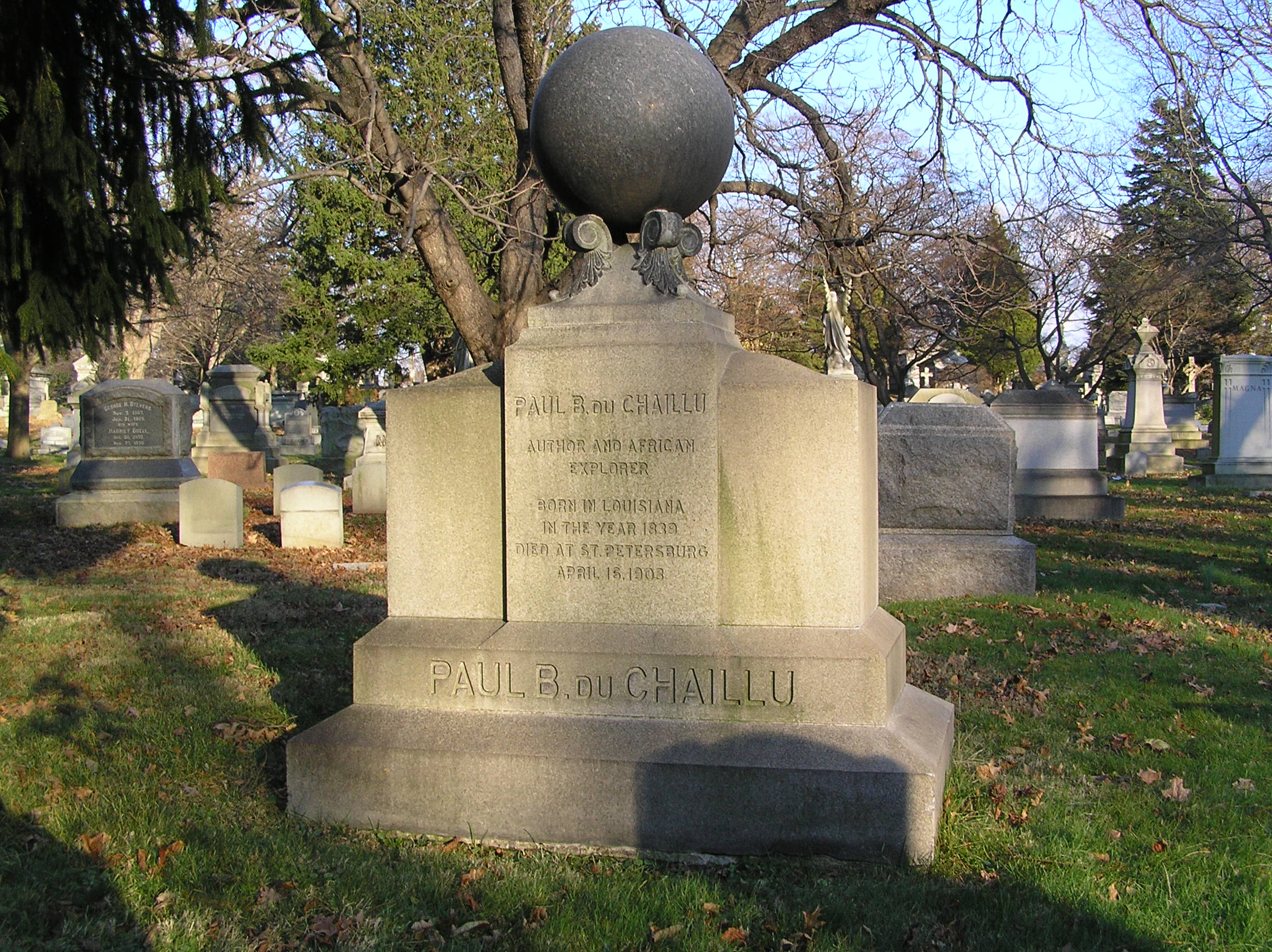
The gravesite of Paul DuChaillu in Woodlawn Cemetery

Du Chaillu was a friend of Edward Clodd and was present at one of Clodd's Whitsun gatherings at Strafford House, Aldeburgh, Suffolk, in company with John Rhys, Grant Allen, York Powell and Joseph Thomson. He was a member along with a variety of mostly literary figures in author J. M. Barrie's amateur cricket team, the "Allahakbarries".

He died following a stroke of paralysis at St. Petersburg, while on a scholarly visit to Russia as part of his research on the Scandinavian peoples. He is interred at Woodlawn Cemetery in the Bronx, New York City.
