= Ivindo River =

Invindo River
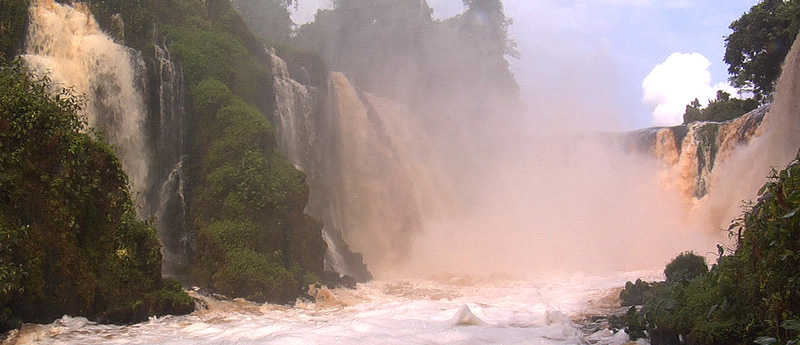
- View of Kongou Falls from the central part of the falls. The chinese are to build a dam that will destroy the falls.

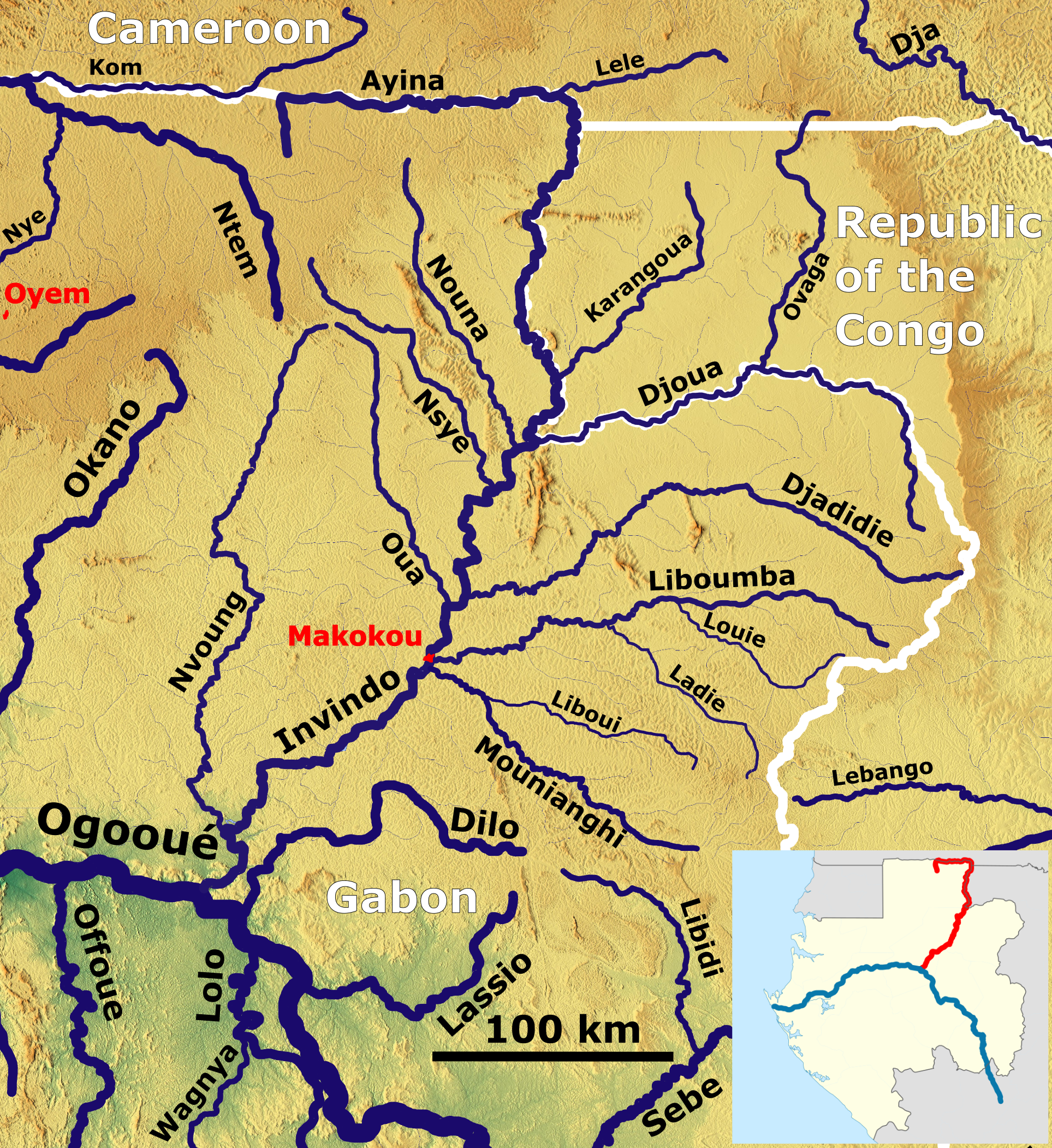
- Course of the Ivindo (red) with its tributaries

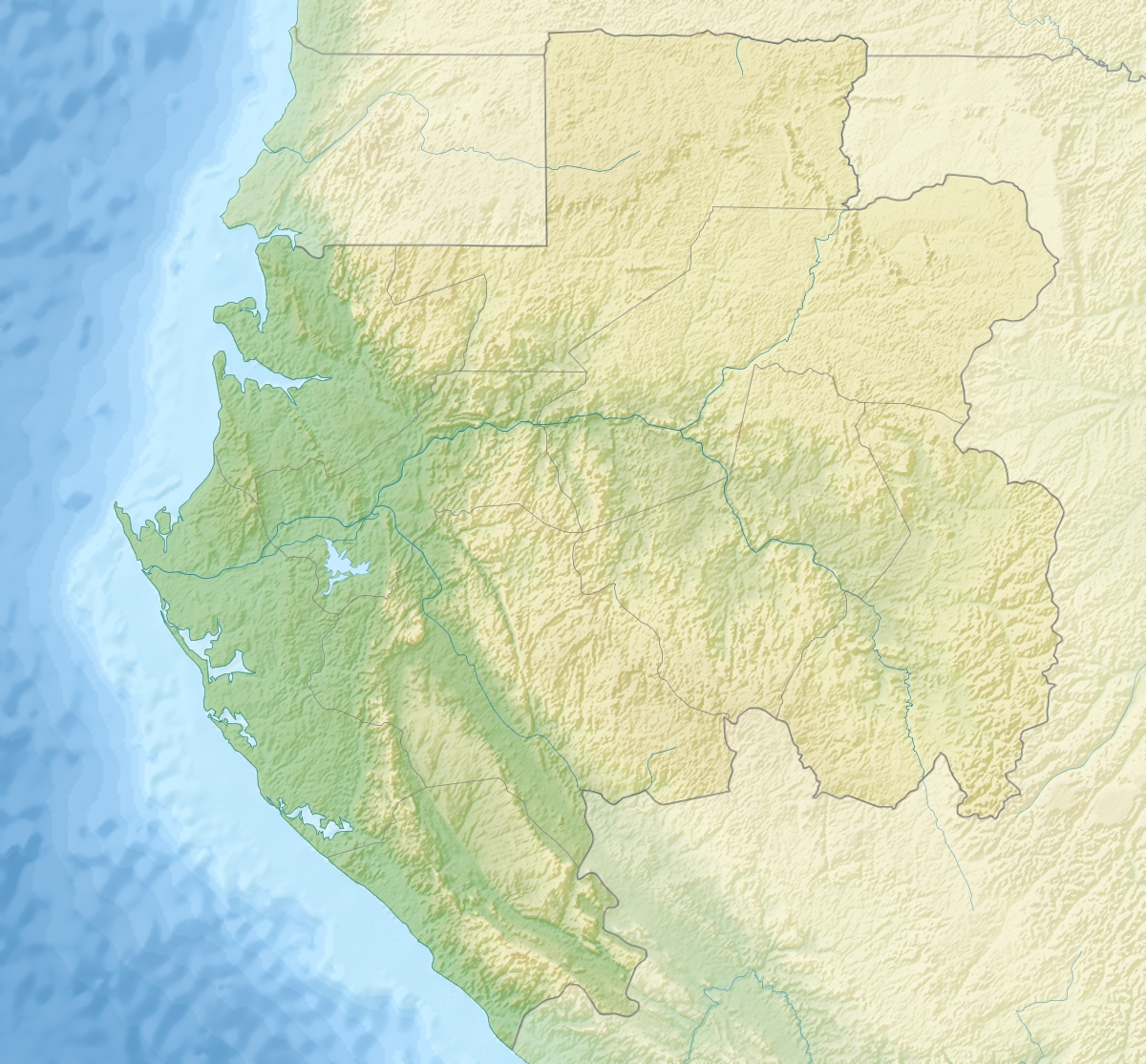
- Location of mouth
- Native name: Rivière Ivindo (French)

Location
- Country: Gabon

Physical characteristics
- Mouth
  - coordinates: 0°09′24″S 12°10′22″E

The Ivindo River (French: Rivière Ivindo) is the most important tributary of the Ogooué River, which flows in Gabon.

== Course ==
The Ivindo River flows from northeast Gabon to the southwest, eventually emptying into the Ogooué River. It flows through some of the wildest and most attractive rainforest in Africa. The upper stretch of the river is fairly gentle, draining the gentle plateau of eastern Gabon. Below the town of Makokou, the only significant town on the river, it drops off the plateau in a series of spectacular waterfalls and gorges.

== Tributaries ==
- Djoua, which is also a natural border between Gabon and Congo
- Djadie, also written Zadia, which flows across Mekambo
- Liboumba, whose main tributary is the Lodié River
- Mvoung, which flows across Ovan and main tributary is the Kuye River
- Oua
- Bouinandjé
- Karangoua

== Exploration ==
The Ivindo below Makokou was first traversed by a whitewater expedition in 1998. This was a group from Jackson Hole, Wyoming, consisting of Chris Guier, Bruce Hayse, Louise Lasley, Marilyn Olsen, Rick Sievers and Howie Wolke. The group encountered four impressive falls: Kongue, Mingouli, Tsengue Leledei, and an unnamed and undescribed falls between Mingouli and Tsengue Leledei which was perhaps the most beautiful of all. There were many stretches of whitewater and the banks were remarkable for groups of unafraid elephants and occasional other mammals.

== Trivia ==
- The Trans-Gabon Railway has two bridges over the confluence between the Ivindo and the Ogowe Rivers.
- Much of the area around the Ivindo has received National Park status.

== See also ==
- Kongou Falls
