= Ogooué River =

River in Gabon, Africa

Ogooué
- The Ogooué watershed

Location
- Country: Gabon, Republic of the Congo

Physical characteristics
- Source
  - location: Kengue, Republic of the Congo
  - elevation: 840 m (2,760 ft)
- Mouth: Atlantic Ocean
  - location: Port Gentil, Gabon
  - coordinates: 1.0272°S 8.8848°E
  - elevation: 0 m (0 ft)
- Length: 1,200 km (750 mi)
- Basin size: 225,217.5 km^{2} (86,957.0 mi^{2})
- Discharge
  - location: Ogooué Delta
  - average: (Period: 1971–2000)5,148.05 m^{3}/s (181,802 cu ft/s)
  - minimum: 1,950 m^{3}/s (69,000 cu ft/s)
  - maximum: 7,340 m^{3}/s (259,000 cu ft/s) (13,500 m^{3}/s (480,000 cu ft/s)
- Discharge
  - location: Lambaréné
  - average: (Period: 1971–2000)4,485.4 m^{3}/s (158,400 cu ft/s)
  - minimum: 1,610 m^{3}/s (57,000 cu ft/s)
  - maximum: 9,440 m^{3}/s (333,000 cu ft/s)
- Discharge
  - location: Ndjolé
  - average: (Period: 1971–2000)3,194.8 m^{3}/s (112,820 cu ft/s)
  - minimum: 1,200 m^{3}/s (42,000 cu ft/s)
  - maximum: 6,600 m^{3}/s (230,000 cu ft/s)
- Discharge
  - location: Lastoursville
  - average: (Period: 1971–2000)1,305 m^{3}/s (46,100 cu ft/s)
  - minimum: 650 m^{3}/s (23,000 cu ft/s)
  - maximum: 2,800 m^{3}/s (99,000 cu ft/s)
- Discharge
  - location: Franceville
  - average: (Period: 1953–1981)253 m^{3}/s (8,900 cu ft/s)
  - minimum: 122 m^{3}/s (4,300 cu ft/s)
  - maximum: 520 m^{3}/s (18,000 cu ft/s)

Basin features
- Progression: Atlantic Ocean
- River system: Ogooué River
- Tributaries
  - left: Letili, Lebombi, Lekedi, Leyou, Lolo, Offoue, Ngounié
  - right: Mpassa, Léconi, Sebe, Lassio, Dilo, Ivindo, Nké, Okano, Abanga

The Ogooué (or Ogowe), also known as the Nazareth River, some 1,200 km (750 mi) long, is the principal river of Gabon in west-central Africa and the fourth largest river in Africa by volume of discharge. Its watershed drains nearly the entire country of Gabon, with some tributaries reaching into the Republic of the Congo, Cameroon, and Equatorial Guinea.

== Geography ==
=== Course ===
The first European explorer to trace the river to its source was Pierre Savorgnan de Brazza, who traveled in the area in the 1870s. The river rises in the northwest of the Batéké Plateau near Kengue, Republic of the Congo. It runs northwest and enters Gabon near Boumango. Poubara Falls are near Maulongo. From Lastoursville up to Ndjolé, rapids make the Ogooué unnavigable. From Ndjolé it runs west and enters the Gulf of Guinea near Ozouri, south of Port-Gentil.

=== Delta ===
The delta is quite large, about 100 km long and 100 km wide. A 30,000 ha site, including much of Mandji Island, has been designated an Important Bird Area by BirdLife International because it supports significant populations of many bird species.

=== Basin ===
The basin is 223,000 km^{2} (86,000 mi^{2}), of which 189,500 km^{2} (73,200 mi^{2}) or 85 percent lies within Gabon.

Basin area by country:

Country	Area		%
Country	km^{2}	mi^{2}	%
Cameroon	5,200	2,000	2.34
Equatorial Guinea	2,000	770	0.89
Gabon	189,500	73,200	84.98
Republic of the Congo	26,300	10,200	11.79
Ogooué basin total	223,000	86,000	100.00

Distance from river mouth:

Station	River kilometer (rkm)	Altitude (m)
Lambaréné	183	12
Ngounié*	196	13
Abanga*	242	20
Ndjolé	280	25
Okano*	314	40
N'golo*	359	72
Offoué*	424	142
Booué	451	161
Ivindo *	481	180
Dilo*	503	182
Lolo*	512	186
Lassio*	535	200
Lastoursville	616	226
Sébé*	685	242
Leyou*	696	243
Léconi*	714	248
Lékabi*	725	249
Lébombi*	774	270
Mpassa*	802	280
Baniaka*	871	426

*River in confluence

Gauging stations along the Ogooué River:

Station	River kilometer (rkm)	Elevation (m)	Drainage basin (km^{2})	Average discharge (m^{3}/s) *
Ogooué Delta	0	0	225,217.5	5,148.05
Lambaréné	183	12	205,228.5	4,485.4
Ndjolé	280	25	160,106.9	3,191.5
Booué	451	161	130,931.4	2,746.9
Lastoursville	616	226	45,767.1	1,305
Franceville	802	280	8,570.2	233.4
^{*} Period: 1971–2000

== Discharge ==
Ogooué River multiannual average discharge at gauging stations. Period from 1971 to 2000.
Period	Average discharge (m^{3}/s)
Ogooué Delta	5,148
Lambaréné	4,485
Ndjolé	3,192
Booué	2,747
Lastoursville	1,305
Franceville	233

Month	Average monthly flow (m³/s) at delta		
Month	Dry years	Normal	Wet years
DEC–FEB	3,744.5	4,285	4,826.5
MAR–MAY	4,883	6,336	7,789
JUN–AUG	1,625.3	1,997	2,188.7
SEP–NOV	6,935	8,041	9,147
Average	4,296.7	5,142.25	5,987.8

Ogooué River discharge (m^{3}/s) at Lambaréné gauging station (period from 1929–2017):
Water year	Min	Mean	Max	Water year	Min	Mean	Max
1929/30	1,250	3,569	5,030	1969/70	2,193	5,386	9,533
1930/31	1,390	4,238	6,980	1970/71	1,649	4,214	8,220
1931/32	1,590	4,259	7,580	1971/72	1,739	3,826	6,871
1932/33	1,380	4,126	6,630	1972/73	1,720	4,199	7,100
1933/34	2,390	5,449	10,800	1973/74	1,570	4,252	8,260
1934/35	1,850	4,888	6,690	1974/75	1,670	4,642	8,940
1935/36	1,690	4,612	7,850	1975/76–1979/80: No data			
1936/37	1,930	4,835	8,210	1980/81	1,550	4,290	7,820
1937/38	1,780	4,791	7,180	1981/82	1,740	4,100	6,900
1938/39	2,170	5,905	11,300	1982/83	1,140	3,520	8,550
1939/40	1,950	4,762	6,930	1983/84	902	4,230	6,530
1940/41	1,740	3,936	6,460	1984/85	2,200	4,670	7,610
1941/42	1,430	3,707	5,720	1985/86	1,610	4,060	6,800
1942/43	1,370	4,292	6,880	1986/87	1,580	3,690	7,160
1943/44	2,330	5,874	9,450	1987/88	1,970	4,940	8,880
1944/45	2,140	5,273	7,980	1988/89	1,780	4,700	9,810
1945/46	1,690	4,600	8,490	1989/90	2,060	5,030	10,800
1946/47	2,340	5,861	9,310	1990/91–1994/95: No data			
1947/48	2,120	5,545	9,780	1995/96	1,300	4,450	8,310
1948/49	2,640	5,912	10,600	1996/97	1,320	4,216	6,510
1949/50	1,950	5,300	9,600	1997/98	1,110	3,661	6,300
1950/51	1,640	5,280	9,470	1998/99	1,290	3,595	7,940
1951/52	2,350	5,660	9,080	1999/00	1,280	4,798	8,350
1952/53	2,050	4,770	7,200	2000/01	1,290	3,971	7,770
1953/54	1,300	3,597	5,690	2001/02	1,200	4,629	8,260
1954/55	1,900	4,383	7,530	2002/03	1,570	4,722	8,030
1955/56	1,400	4,278	8,100	2003/04	1,900	3,703	5,590
1956/57	1,660	4,252	7,420	2004/05	1,350	3,717	6,020
1957/58	979	3,093	5,110	2005/06	1,500	4,695	8,640
1958/59	1,580	4,179	8,250	2006/07	1,740	4,883	8,720
1959/60	2,160	5,073	9,350	2007/08	1,640	5,112	11,170
1960/61	2,190	5,970	11,000	2008/09	2,520	5,850	9,180
1961/62	1,910	5,227	8,210	2009/10	1,480	3,985	7,260
1962/63	2,170	4,799	6,830	2010/11	1,510	3,690	5,790
1963/64	1,810	4,647	8,500	2011/12	2,190	4,038	9,420
1964/65	2,100	5,074	7,510	2012/13	960	3,931	7,270
1965/66	2,150	5,500	9,470	2013/14	1,420	4,588	8,370
1966/67	1,600	4,482	10,100	2014/15	1,090	3,890	6,930
1967/68	1,823	4,451	7,557	2015/16	980	3,794	8,090
1968/69	2,093	5,020	7,607	2016/17	1,510	3,846	6,490

== Tributaries ==
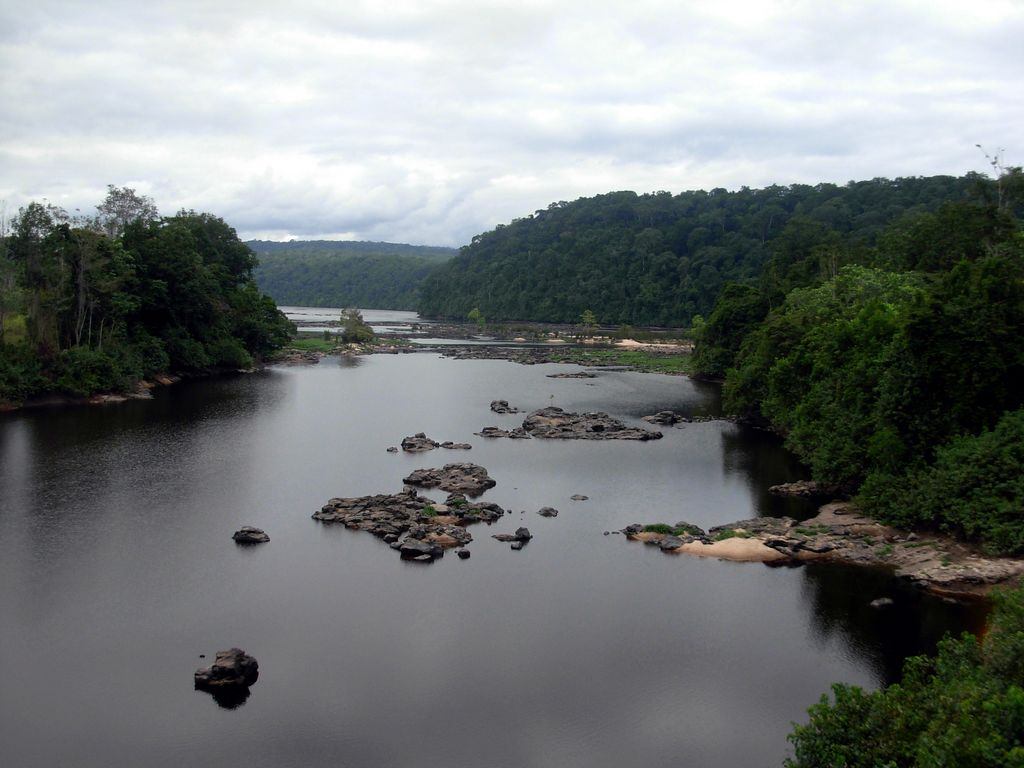
Ogooué River

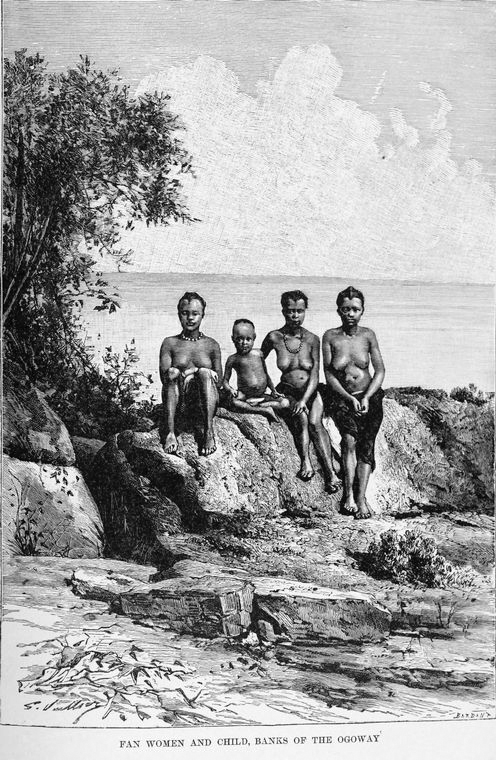
Fan women and child, banks of the Ogoway. From The earth and its inhabitants, Africa (published 1890-1893 [v.1, 1892] )

The river receives water of numerous tributaries including:

- Abanga, which rises in the Cristal Mountains, near Medouneu
- Baniaka
- Dilo
- Iyinda, the most important tributary
- Letili
- Lassio
- Lebombi
- Lekabi
- Lekedi
- Lekoni, which flows across Akieni and Leconi
- Letili
- Leyou
- Lolo
- Mbine
- Ngolo
- Ngounie
- Nke
- Offoue
- Okano, whose main tributary is the Lara River
- Mpassa, which flows across Franceville
- Sebe, which flows past Okondja
- Wagny

The main river and tributaries are (sorted in order from the mouth heading upstream):
Left tributary	Right tributary	Length (km)	Basin size (km²)	Average discharge (m^{3}/s)
Ogooué		1,200	225,217.5	5,148.05
Ogooué Delta
Kolo			496.8	13.33
Nkomi		170	5,816.6	194.01
	Akiri	20	248.1	8.91
Lower Ogooué
Olimbé			1,352.9	43.41
	Lac Ompindi		325.8	12.28
	Alooué		552	21.45
	Mangoué		992.5	41.97
	Oronga		1,248.6	44.86
Nkovié			521.8	17.6
Agouma			1,983.3	70.11
Lac Zilé			322.4	9.15
Ngounié		680	32,636.7	1,002.4
	Biné		752.6	21.03
M'boumi		109	1,606.4	35.38
	Abanga	226	8,204.4	190.31
	Missanga	32	476.5	9.88
Middle Ogooué
Lébé			376.5	7.01
	Okano	280	11,257.2	192.91
Machoka			559.8	9.78
	Ngolo		1,023.1	14.62
Mingoué		113	1,178.9	21.17
Leledi			2,038.5	33.23
Lope			378.9	5.07
Offoué		235	7,673.9	166.63
	Nké		1,883.8	26.04
	Ivindo	686	63,201.4	1,112.4
	Dilo	190	3,166	54.3
Lolo		240	11,212.7	278.17
	Lassio	160	5,413.3	114.44
Upper Ogooué
Lehibou			410.4	9.81
	Momba		643.1	15.34
	Ouolo		640.7	16.08
	Sébé	292	10,069.7	236.97
Leyou		134	1,771	69.82
	Lékoni	252	7,592.8	344.36
	Lékabi		1,542.3	46.67
Lekedi		48	1,244.5	34.63
Lébombi		91	3,769.4	106.89
	Mpassa	163	6,339.6	312
Baniaka			749.9	21.38
Letili			1,682.1	43.46
	Loua		361.6	11.03
Djoulou			509.3	12.71
Loungou			481.4	11.42
Léfou			382.7	8.88
	Djouéli		377.8	12.19
Léouké			1,006.9	23.32
	Nsiele		364.7	14.06

== Ecology ==
It mostly consists of undisturbed rainforest with some savanna grassland where the mid-year dry season is longest. It is home to a high biodiversity. All three species of African crocodile, for instance, occur in the river: the Nile crocodile, the dwarf crocodile, and the slender-snouted crocodile. It is also the type locality for the catfish Synodontis acanthoperca.

== Economy ==
The Ogooué is navigable from Ndjole to the sea. It is used to bring wood to the Port-Gentil Harbour. The basin includes several major conservation reserves, including Lope National Park. The catchment area has an average population density of 4 people per km². Towns along the river include Ayem, Adané, Loanda, Lambaréné, Ndjole, Booué, Kankan, Maulongo, Mboungou-Mbadouma, Ndoro, Lastoursville, Moanda, and Franceville near the Congo border. Towns in Congo include Zanaga.
