= List of members of the National Assembly of Gabon =

National Assembly Assemblée Nationale
- 4th Legislature

Type
- Type: Lower house

Structure
- Seats: 121
- Political groups: Gabonese Democratic Party (115) Rally for Gabon (3); Circle of Liberal Reformers (1); Social Democratic Party (1) Union for the New Republic (1)

Elections
- Last election: 17 December 2011

Website
- www.assemblee-nationale.ga

This is a list of the current members of the National Assembly of Gabon

Members of the National Assembly of Gabon
Member	Party
Gisèle Akoghet	GDP
Estelle Flore Angangou	GDP
Alphonse Angara	GDP
François Ango Ndoutoume	GDP
Samuel Angoue	GDP
André Angwe Aboughe	GDP
Berthe Azizet	GDP
Irène Farelle Bal’abondhoume Epse Kounde	GDP
Alexandré Barro Chambrier	GDP
Célestin Bayogha Nembe	GDP
André Dieudonné Berre	GDP
Paul Bie Eyene	GDP
Modeste Binet	GDP
Paul Biyoghé Mba	GDP
Nicaise Biyoghe Bi-Nzue	GDP
Jean Pierre Boukila	GDP
Faustin Boukoubi	GDP
Alain Simplice Boungoueres	GDP
Marcel Doupampy Makota	GDP
Steve Thierry Edzeba-Bicke	GDP
Vincent de Paul Ella Menie	GDP
Paul Essie Emane	GDP
Maurice Nestor Eyanmba Tsimat	GDP
Vincent de Paul Gondjout	GDP
Emmanuel Idoundou	GDP
Jonathan Ignoumba	GDP
Barnabé Indoumou Mamboungou	GDP
Clotaire Christian Ivala	GDP
Gervais Landry Kah	GDP
Bruce Tengo Koumba	GDP
Emmanuel Late	GDP
Gilbert Lengomas Matombi	GDP
Martin Mabala	GDP
Justin Maganga Manfoumbi	GDP
Albertine Maganga Moussavou	GDP
Alain Patrick Makungu	GDP
Gabriel Malonga-Mouelet	GDP
Luc Marat Abyla	GDP
Narcisse Massala Tsamba	GDP
Jean Massima	GDP
Vincent Mavoungou Bouyou	GDP
Fernando Mawobo Lendoye	GDP
Paul Mba Abessole	RPG
Ferdinand Mbadinga Mombo	GDP
Solange Mbondzi	GDP
Joseph Mboumba	GDP
Edgard Anicet Mboumbou Miyakou	GDP
Michel Mboumi	GDP
Jean Claude Mboumi Nzinzi	GDP
Michel Menga M'essone	GDP
Phillippe Romain Mikanga Semba	GDP
Sylvain Momoadjambo	GDP
Aloïse Moubamba Mouketou	GDP
Apollinaire Adonis Moudouma	GDP
Martin Moulengui Mabende	GDP
Louis Marie Moussavou	GDP
Juliette Moutsinga	GDP
Jean Claude Mpono	GDP
Marcellin Mve Ebang	GDP
Paul Nang Ndong	GDP
Bernabé Ndaki	GDP
Marguerite Ndekayino	GDP
René Ndemezo'o Obiang	GDP
François Ndjamono	GDP
Albert Ndjave Ndjoy	GDP
Paul Ndong Nguema	GDP
Albert Ndong Obiang	GDP
Jean Marie Ndoutoume Essone	vGDP
Jaques Ndziami	GDP
Bernard Ndzoumba	GDP
Idriss Ngari	GDP
Angélique Ngoma	GDP
Raymond Ngombela	GDP
Ludovic Ngondjiga	GDP
Nicolas Ngou-Mve	GDP
Maxime-Laurent Ngozo Issondou	GDP
Jaques Nguema Essono	GDP
Alexandre Nguema Mba	GDP
Jean Marie Nguema Ndong	RPG
André Christ Nguimbi	GDP
Charlotte Nkero Mougnoko	GDP
Adrien Nkoghe Essingone	GDP
Pauline Olive Épse Louembet Nongoue Moundounga	GDP
Rachel Ntimedjiara	GDP
Francis Ntolo Eya'a	GDP
Aurélien Ntoutoume Mebiame	GDP
Robert Ntoutoume	GDP
Marie-Madeleine Nyingone Anda	RPG
Joséphine Nze-Mouenidiambou	GDP
Phillippe Nzengue Mayila	CLR
Guy Nzouba-Ndama	GDP
Jean Marie Obama Ondo	GDP
Jules Marius Ogouebandja Ogouempono	GDP
Philomène Ogoula	GDP
Maxime Ondimba	GDP
Richard Auguste Onouviet	GDP
Faustin Ontsougou	GDP
Guy Christian Ossagou	GDP
Charles Otando	GDP
Edgard Owono Ndong	GDP
Paulette Épse Païei Koho	GDP
André Jules Reteno	GDP
Albert Richard Royembo	GDP
Jean Claude Simepoungou	GDP
Jean Richard Sylong	GDP
Nicolas Tali	GDP
Paul Toungui	GDP
Laurent Yami	GDP
Alexandre Mbile Youbengoye	GDP
Bertrand Zibi Abeghe	GDP
Esther Zouga Aki	GDP
