= Parliament of Gabon =

Legislature

Parliament of Gabon Parlement du Gabon

Type
- Type: Bicameral
- Houses: National Assembly; Senate

Leadership
- President of the Senate: Huguette Nyana Ekoume since 17 December 2025
- President of the National Assembly: Régis Onanga Ndiaye since 17 November 2025
- Leader of the Opposition: Vacant
- Seats: 215 members (145 and 70)

Elections
- National Assembly voting system: single-member constituency
- Senate voting system: single-member constituency
- Last National Assembly election: 27 September 2025
- Last Senate election: 26 August 2023

Meeting place
- Palais Léon M'ba, Libreville

The Parliament of Gabon consists of two chambers:

- The Senate (Upper Chamber)
- The National Assembly (Lower Chamber)

The Parliament was suspended following the coup d'état four days after the 2023 general election. It was then replaced by a Transitional Parliament until new elections in 2025 selected deputies of the National Assembly. However, no timeline for the reconvening of the Senate has been set.

== See also ==
- Politics of Gabon
- List of legislatures by country
- Legislative branch
