= Richard Auguste Onouviet =

Gabonese politician

President of the National Assembly of Gabon
- In office 8 April 2016 – 30 April 2018
- Preceded by: Guy Nzouba-Ndama
- Succeeded by: Faustin Boukoubi (In January 2019)

Personal details
- Born: 14 June 1949
- Political party: Gabonese Democratic Party

Richard Auguste Onouviet (born 14 June 1949) is a Gabonese politician who served as President of the National Assembly of Gabon from 8 April 2016 to 30 April 2018. Holding a succession of ministerial portfolios, Onouviet served in the government of Gabon as Minister of Water and the Environment from 1999 to 2002, Minister of Mines, Energy, and Oil from 2002 to 2007, Minister of Planning from 2007 to 2009, and as Minister of Decentralization and Urban Policy in 2009. A member of the Gabonese Democratic Party (PDG), he has been a Deputy in the National Assembly since 2009.

== Early administrative career ==
Onouviet was born in Lambaréné, located in northern Gabon. He studied philosophy and political science in France and was a financial official at Mokta, a French company, from 1976 to 1979. He then held important positions at the Franceville Uranium Mines Company (Compagnie des mines d'uranium de Franceville, COMUF) in Gabon from 1979 to 1986, eventually becoming the Deputy Director-General of COMUF. Subsequently he was Vice-President of the Energy and Water Company of Gabon (Société d'énergie et d'eau du Gabon, SEEG) from 1987 to 1990, and he was also appointed as Special Adviser to President Omar Bongo in 1987.

Onouviet was appointed as Director-General of the Gabonese Development Bank in 1990. In late May 1995, he announced that the bank's profits for 1994 (2.64 billion CFA francs) were 18% higher than its profits for 1993, and he expressed hope that there would be similar growth in 1995.

== Government service and political career ==
Onouviet remained Director-General of the Gabonese Development Bank until he was appointed to the government as Minister of Water, Forests, Fisheries, and Reforestation on 25 January 1999; later, in December 1999, he was assigned additional responsibility for the Environment and the Protection of Nature. In the December 2001 parliamentary election, he was elected to the National Assembly as a PDG candidate in Lambaréné. After the election, he remained in the government that was formed on 27 January 2002, but he was moved to the position of Minister of Mines, Energy, Oil, and Hydraulic Resources. That change of portfolio marked a major promotion for Onouviet. A technocrat, he benefited from the support of Georges Rawiri, the influential President of the Senate, who was also a native of Lambaréné.

At the time of the November 2005 presidential election, Onouviet worked on President Bongo's re-election campaign as President of the Commission for Relations with Economic Operators.

In 2006, Onouviet headed a faction within the government that favored a Brazilian company during its dispute with a Chinese company over control of the exploitation of the Belinga iron reserves, a matter of tremendous economic importance for Gabon. The Chinese, who promised to build more infrastructure than the Brazilians, were backed by another faction in the government (headed by Minister of State for Foreign Affairs Jean Ping) and they ultimately prevailed, receiving rights to the iron reserves on 7 September 2006.

In the December 2006 parliamentary election, Onouviet was again elected to the National Assembly as the PDG candidate in Lambaréné. Speaking to children in Lambaréné in late 2007, when Bongo was marking the 40th anniversary of his presidency, Onouviet described Bongo as "the messiah". After nearly six years as Minister of Mines, Energy, Oil, and Hydraulic Resources, Onouviet was instead appointed as Minister of Planning and Development Programming on 28 December 2007.

At the time of the April 2008 local elections, Onouviet was suspended from his party functions for six months for indiscipline due to his support of candidates who were not backed by the PDG. In the government named on 14 January 2009, he was moved to the position of Minister of Decentralization and Urban Policy.

Bongo died in June 2009. After Bongo's son, Ali Bongo Ondimba, won the 30 August 2009 presidential election, he dismissed Onouviet from the government on 17 October 2009. The dismissal of Onouviet, who had remained loyal to Ali Bongo during the election period, was part of a major reworking of the state administration, in which many prominent ministers and officials were replaced. Onouviet then returned to his seat in the National Assembly, representing Lambaréné. On 16 January 2010, he donated a dump truck to Lambaréné in order to facilitate the city's sanitation efforts. On that occasion, Onouviet expressed his hope that the law on decentralization would enable further improvements for Lambaréné and other localities across Gabon.

Onouviet subsequently served as First Vice-President of the National Assembly. Following the resignation of Guy Nzouba Ndama, Onouviet was elected to succeed him as President of the National Assembly on 8 April 2016. He received 89 votes, while six deputies voted against him and two abstained.

After protesters set fire to the National Assembly building on 31 August 2016 in anger over the re-election of Ali Bongo, Onouviet toured the ruined building and expressed dismay: "I'm sad for my country because such things should never happen".

On 30 April 2018, after the failure of the government of Emmanuel Issoze Ngondet to organize 2018 Gabonese parliamentary elections, the Constitutional Court of Gabon ordered Onouviet to resign, dissolved the National Assembly of Gabon and entrusted legislative power to the Senate of Gabon.

Following the 2023 Gabonese coup d'état, he was among several officials of the Bongo regime who were arrested by the Committee for the Transition and Restoration of Institutions and charged with treason.
