= Lucie Milebou Aubusson =

Gabonese ophthalmologist and politician

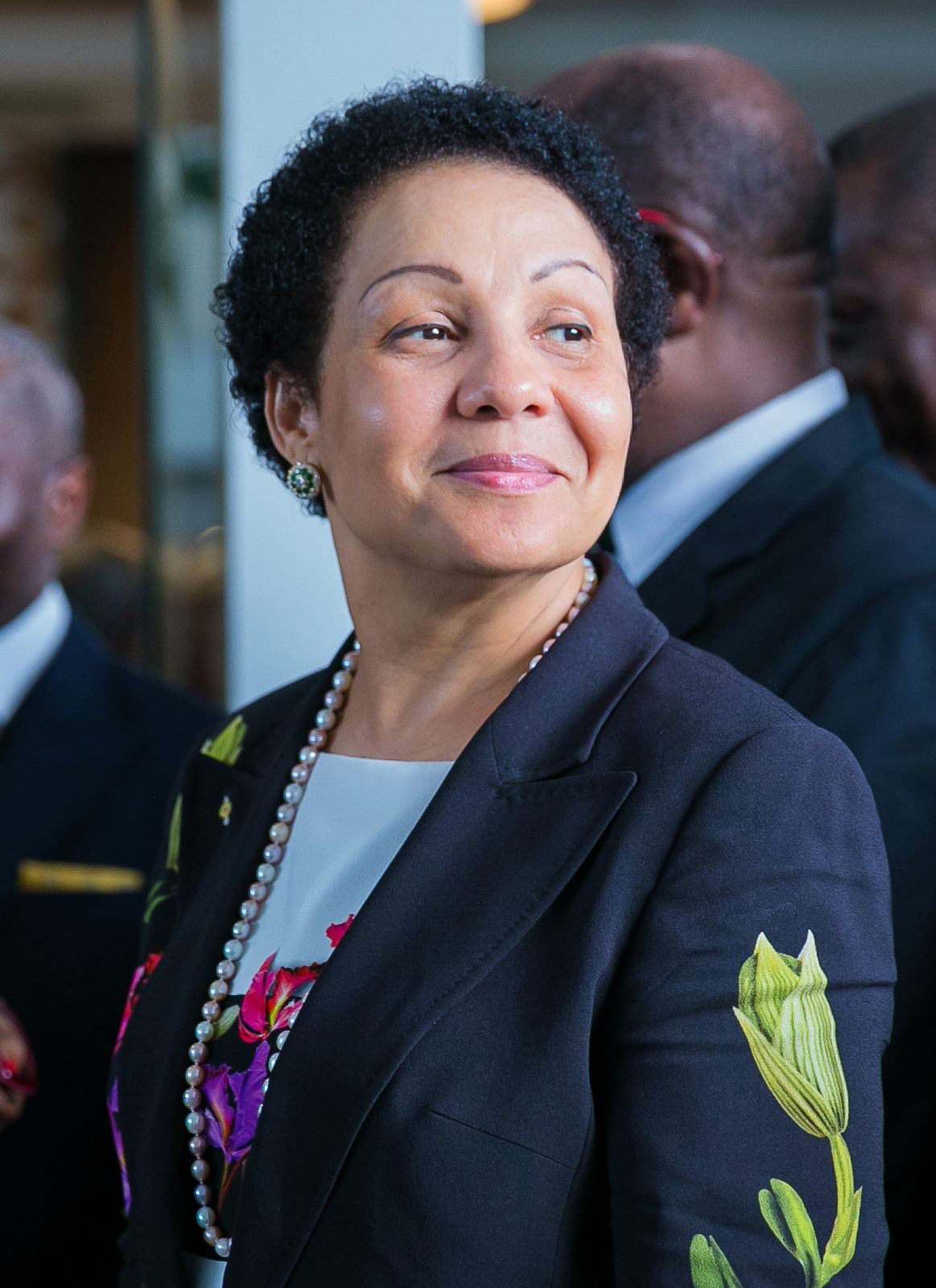

President of the Senate of Gabon
- In office 27 February 2015 – 30 August 2023
- President: Ali Bongo Ondimba
- Preceded by: Rose Francine Rogombé
- Succeeded by: Paulette Missambo

Personal details
- Born: 25 February 1957 (age 69)
- Party: Gabonese Democratic Party

Lucie Milebou Aubusson also known as Lucie Mboussou (born 25 February 1957) is a Gabonese ophthalmologist and politician who has been President of the Senate since 27 February 2015 to 30 August 2023.

== Early life and education ==
Aubusson was born on 25 February 1957 in Fougamou. She has a PhD in Medicine and a Diploma in Ophthalmology from the Aix-Marseille University in France.

== Career ==
Aubusson was the first female ophthalmologist in Gabon. She was the Chief Medical Officer at the Jeanne Ebori Foundation in Libreville from 1988 until 2002 and was an assistant professor at the Faculty of Medicine of Libreville. She was medical director of Medivision Clinic and a founding member of the NGO Gabon Medical Assistance.

Aubusson is a member of the Gabonese Democratic Party and was elected to the senate for the commune of Fougamou in 2002. She was a member of the standing committees on Foreign Affairs, Finance and Regional Planning.

Aubusson has served as President of the National Network of Women Senators of Gabon and Deputy Vice-President of the Gabonese Parliamentary Group. She was Vice President of the Senate during the Third Parliament and became President for its fourth term (2015–2021), succeeding Rose Francine Rogombé.

== Awards and honours ==
- Grand Cross of the Order of the Equatorial Star

== Personal life ==
Aubusson is married to Michel Mboussou, CEO of the National Disease Insurance and Social Guarantee Fund (CNAMGS), and has three children.
