= René Radembino Coniquet =

Gabonese politician

President of the Senate of Gabon
- In office 2006–2009
- President: Omar Bongo
- Preceded by: Léonard Andjembé (interim)
- Succeeded by: Rose Francine Rogombé

Personal details
- Born: 26 June 1932
- Died: 4 September 2014 (aged 82)
- Political party: Gabonese Democratic Party

René Radembino Coniquet (26 June 1932 – 4 September 2014) was a Gabonese politician who served as President of the Senate of Gabon from 2006 to 2009. He was a Senator from 1997 to 2014 and a long-time member of the Gabonese Democratic Party (PDG).

== Life and career ==
Radembino Coniquet was born in Libreville. He became Deputy Director of Finance in 1961, Prefect of Ngounié in 1962, and Secretary of the Council of Ministers in 1963. Subsequently he was Secretary-General of the Government before being appointed as Secretary-General of the Presidency in 1967. He was appointed as Minister Secretary-General of the Presidency on 12 July 1972; later, he was promoted to the rank of Minister of State. Radembino Coniquet remained Secretary-General of the Presidency until early 1994, when Mamadou Diop was appointed to succeed him.

When the Senate was created in 1997, Radembino Coniquet was elected as a Senator from Owendo and became the President of the Commission of Laws and Administrative Affairs in the Senate on 10 March 1997. He was re-elected to the Senate in 2003. Upon the establishment of the Pan-African Parliament in March 2004, Radembino Coniquet became one of Gabon's five representatives in that body.

Later in the Senate's term, following the death of Georges Rawiri on 9 April 2006, Radembino Coniquet was elected to succeed him as President of the Senate on 24 May 2006. Radembino Coniquet received 86 votes from the 90 senators who voted and was to serve as President of the Senate for the remainder of the Senate term, ending in 2009. Rawiri had been Co-President of the Africa Caribbean Pacific - European Union (ACP-EU) Joint Parliamentary Assembly, and Radembino Coniquet was designated to succeed him in that role as well.

Radembino Coniquet met with Wu Bangguo, the Chairman of the Standing Committee of the National People's Congress of the People's Republic of China, on 7 November 2008. They expressed a mutual desire for increased cooperation between the two countries.

In the January 2009 Senate election, Radembino Coniquet stood again as the PDG candidate in Owendo and was re-elected to the Senate. He retained his seat despite the fact that only a minority of Owendo's municipal councillors (who were the electors) belonged to the PDG. Following that election, Rose Francine Rogombé was elected to succeed Radembino Coniquet as President of the Senate on 16 February 2009.

Speaking to Gabonews in Midrand on 29 October 2009, Radembino Coniquet said that the Pan-African Parliament was working to strengthen the African Union, with the ultimate goal of establishing a continental government.

Radembino Coniquet was a Vice-President of the PDG as of 2008.

Radembino Coniquet died in Libreville at age 82 on the night of 3–4 September 2014.
