= Jean-François Ndongou =

Gabonese politician

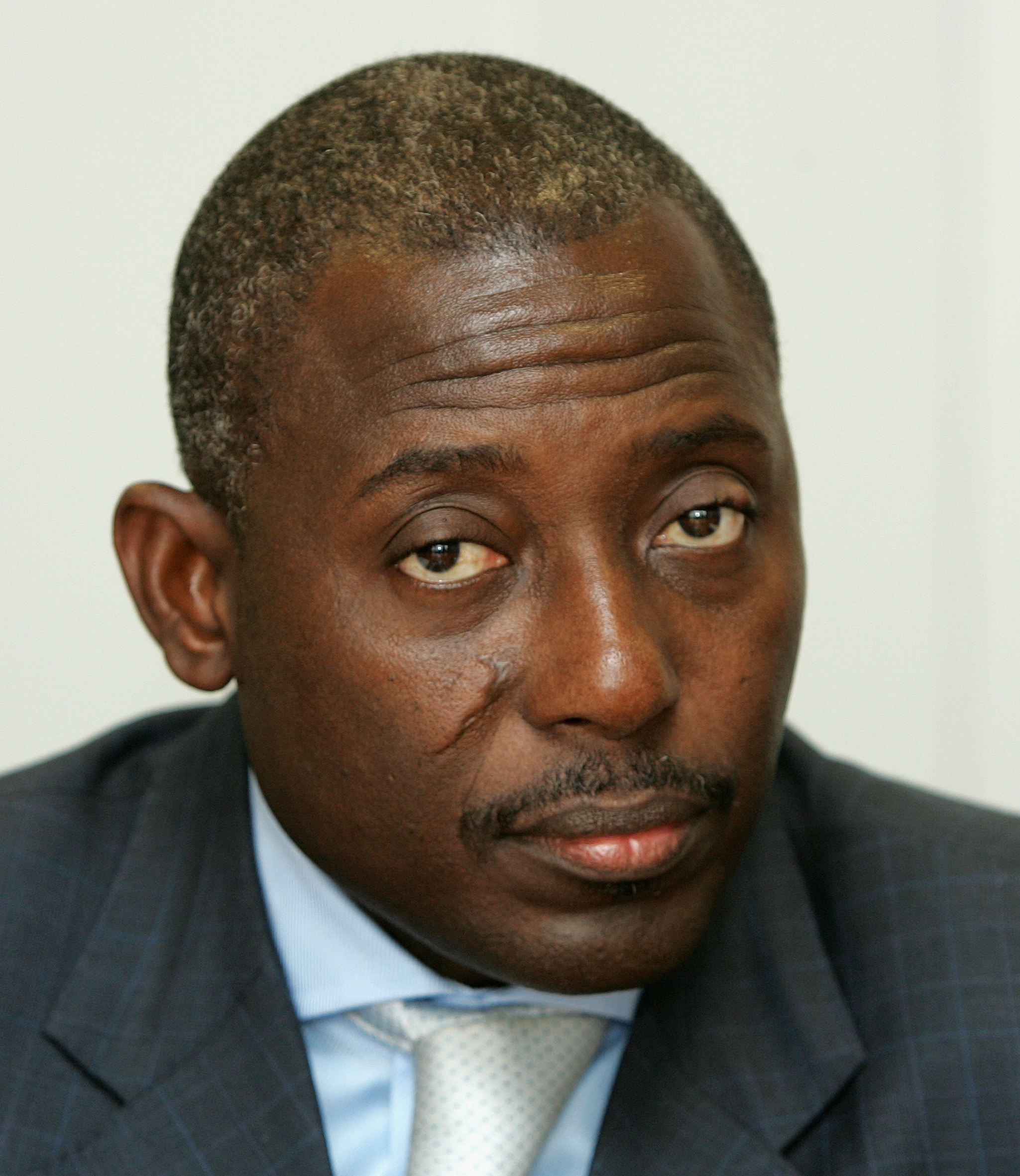
- Jean-François Ndongou in 2005

President of the National Assembly of Gabon (transition)
- In office 15 September 2023 – 17 November 2025
- President: Brice Oligui Nguema
- Preceded by: Faustin Boukoubi
- Succeeded by: Régis Onanga Ndiaye

Member of the National Assembly for Mandji
- Incumbent
- Assumed office 23 December 2001

Minister of the Interior
- In office 24 June 2009 – 10 March 2012
- President: Rose Francine Rogombé; Ali Bongo
- Prime Minister: Jean Eyeghe Ndong; Paul Biyoghe Mba; Raymond Ndong Sima; Daniel Ona Ondo
- Preceded by: André Mba Obame
- Succeeded by: Guy-Bertrand Mapangou

Minister of Defense (interim)
- In office 19 July 2009 – 17 October 2009
- President: Rose Francine Rogombé
- Prime Minister: Paul Biyoghe Mba
- Preceded by: Ali Bongo
- Succeeded by: Angélique Ngoma

Minister of State
- In office 16 July 2007 – 14 January 2009
- President: Omar Bongo
- Prime Minister: Jean Eyeghe Ndong
- Preceded by: Louis-Gaston Mayila
- Succeeded by: Denise Mekam'ne

Personal details
- Born: 1960 (age 65–66)
- Party: Gabonese Democratic Party
- Other political affiliations: National Union

Jean-François Ndongou (born 1960) is a Gabonese politician. He is a former interior minister.

Following the 2023 Gabonese coup d'état, Ndongou was appointed president of the National Assembly of Gabon, a position he held until 2025.
