= Paulette Missambo =

Gabonese politician

President of the Senate of Gabon
- In office 18 September 2023 – 17 December 2025
- President: Brice Clotaire Oligui Nguema
- Preceded by: Lucie Milebou Aubusson
- Succeeded by: Huguette Nyana Ekoume

Member of the National Assembly of Gabon
- In office 1991–2009
- President: Omar Bongo
Ministerial offices
Minister of Public Health
In office 4 September 2006 – 28 December 2007
| President | Omar Bongo |
Minister of Transport and Civil Aviation
In office 27 January 2002 – 4 September 2006
| President | Omar Bongo |
Minister of Labor, Employment and Vocational Training
In office 25 January 1999 – 27 January 2002
| President | Omar Bongo |
Minister of State
In office January 28, 1997 – 28 December 2007
| President | Omar Bongo |
Minister of National Education
In office 21 June 1991 – 25 March 1994
| President | Omar Bongo |
Minister of Public Service and Administrative Reforms
In office 26 November 1990 – 21 June 1991
| President | Omar Bongo |
| Succeeded by |

Personal details
- Born: September 20, 1949 (age 76)
- Party: Nation Union (since 2009)
- Other political affiliations: Gabonese Democratic Party (prior to 2009)
- Education: Omar Bongo University; Charles de Gaulle University – Lille III

Paulette Missambo is a Gabonese politician who served as the president of the Senate of Gabon from 18 September 2023 to 17 December 2025.

== Early life and education ==
Paulette Missambo was born on 20 September 1949 in Kessipoughou, Ogooué-Lolo Province, Gabon. She attended Omar Bongo University in Libreville, Gabon and graduated from Charles de Gaulle University – Lille III in Lille, France with a Bachelor's Degree, Master's Degree, and Diploma in Advanced Studies in French linguistics. She returned to Gabon and in 1982 was appoint principal at Port-Gentil National High School, making her the first woman principal in Gabon.

== Political career ==
Missambo was appointed Minister of Public Service and Administrative Reforms on 26 November 1990 and served until 21 June 1991. She was elected to the National Assembly of Gabon in 1991 as a member of the Gabonese Democratic Party and served until 2009. She represented Libreville. From 21 June 1991 to 25 March 1994, she served as the Minister of National Education. From January 28, 1997, to 28 December 2007, she served as the first woman Minister of State. She also served as the Minister of Labor, Employment and Vocational Training between 25 January 1999 and 27 January 2002; Minister of Transport and Civil Aviation between 27 January 2002 to 4 September 2006; and Minister of Public Health between 4 September 2006 and 28 December 2007.

In 2009 she left the Gabonese Democratic Party and joined the Nation Union party. In 2021, she was elected the head of the party, making her the first woman to head a political party in Gabon. She was appointed president of the Senate of Gabon on 18 September 2023 after the 2023 Gabonese coup d'état.

== Honors ==
- Officer of the French Legion of Honour
- Commander of the Ordre des Palmes académiques
- Grand Officer of the Order of the Equatorial Star
