= Mayila =

Mayila is a surname. Notable people with the surname include:

- Louis-Gaston Mayila (1947–2025), Gabonese politician
