= Laure Olga Gondjout =

Gabonese politician (born 1953)

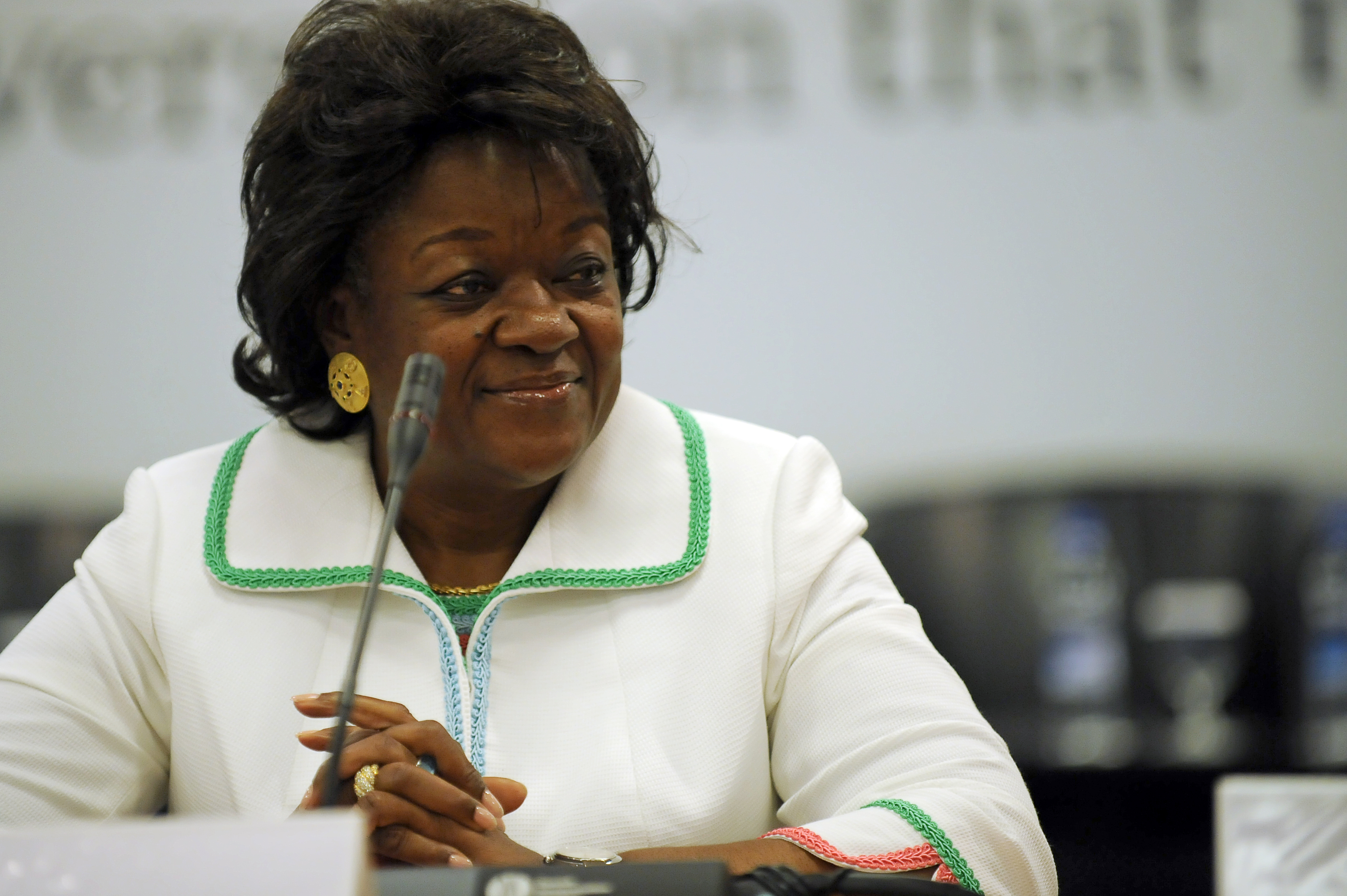

Minister of Foreign Affairs
- In office 6 February 2008 – 7 October 2008
- Prime Minister: Jean Eyeghé Ndong
- Preceded by: Jean Ping
- Succeeded by: Paul Toungui

Minister of Communication, Posts, Telecommunications, and New Information Technologies
- In office 28 December 2007 – 3 February 2008 and 9 October 2008 – 14 January 2011
- Prime Minister: Jean Eyeghé Ndong; Paul Biyoghé Mba

Personal details
- Born: 18 December 1953 (age 72)
- Party: Gabonese Democratic Party
- Parent: Paul Gondjout (father)

Laure Olga Gondjout (born 18 December 1953) is a Gabonese politician. She served in the government of Gabon as Minister of Communication and Telecommunications from 2007 to 2008, as Minister of Foreign Affairs in 2008, and again as Minister of Communication and Digital Economy from 2008 to 2011. Subsequently she was Secretary-General of the Presidency from 2011 to 2014. She has served as Ombudsman from February 2014 to January 2019

== Political career ==
Goundjout is the daughter of Paul Gondjout, a Gabonese politician prominent during the 1960s. She worked as an interpreter and was President Omar Bongo's private secretary for years. On 21 January 2006, she was appointed Deputy Minister to Senior Minister for Foreign Affairs, Jean Ping, in the government of Prime Minister Jean Eyeghe Ndong. After nearly two years in that position, she was appointed Minister of Communication, Posts, Telecommunications, and New Information Technologies on 28 December 2007. Soon afterwards, Jean Ping was elected Chairperson of the Commission of the African Union, and on 4 February 2008 Gondjout was appointed Minister of Foreign Affairs to replace him. She took office as Foreign Minister on 6 February.

In the April 2008 local elections, Gondjout headed the candidate list of the Gabonese Democratic Party (PDG) in the third arrondissement of Libreville.

Gondjout served as Foreign Minister for eight months. In the government appointed on 7 October 2008, she was moved back to her old position as Minister of Communication, Posts, Telecommunications, and New Information Technologies; she was succeeded as Foreign Minister by Paul Toungui on 9 October.

Shortly after the death of President Omar Bongo at a Spanish hospital on 8 June 2009, Gondjout said that the constitution and the institutions of the Republic would be respected. Gondjout subsequently supported Bongo's son, Ali Bongo Ondimba, when he ran to succeed his father as President in the 2009 presidential election. After winning the election, Bongo initially retained Gondjout as Minister of Communication, but he later moved her to the powerful post of Secretary-General of the Presidency on 14 January 2011.

Gondjout reached the age of 60, the official retirement age for administrative positions, in December 2013. Bongo then moved Gondjout from her prominent post as Secretary-General of the Presidency to the comparatively obscure post of Ombudsman on 16 January 2014. She was sworn in as Ombudsman on 11 February 2014. Speaking to PDG activists in the third arrondissement of Libreville on 15 February 2014, Gondjout, who was a member of the PDG Political Bureau, said that she had not resigned from the party, but that she could not hold elective office while serving as Ombudsman and had to relinquish her seat as a municipal councillor in the third arrondissement.

Political offices
| Preceded by Jean Ping | Foreign Minister of Gabon; 2008 | Succeeded by Paul Toungui |
