= Ebang =

Ebang may be,

- Ebang language
- Ebang Palace

== People ==
- Marcellin Mve Ebang
- Didier Ovono Ebang
- Eric Ebang Zué
