= Didjob Divungi Di Ndinge =

Gabonese politician

President of Gabon
- Acting; 6 May 2009 – 10 June 2009
- Prime Minister: Jean Eyeghé Ndong
- Preceded by: Omar Bongo
- Succeeded by: Rose Francine Rogombé (Acting)

Personal details
- Born: 5 May 1946 (age 79) Alombié, French Equatorial Africa (now Gabon)
- Party: Democratic and Republican Alliance

Didjob Divungi Di Ndinge (born 5 May 1946) is a Gabonese politician who was Vice-President of Gabon from 1997 to 2009. He is the President of the Democratic and Republican Alliance (ADERE), a political party. As Vice-President of Gabon, Divungi Di Ndinge exercised presidential powers in an acting capacity from May 2009 to June 2009, while President Omar Bongo Ondimba was hospitalized.

== Political career ==
Divungi Di Ndinge, a member of the Punu ethnic group, was born in Alombié, near Port-Gentil in western Gabon. An engineer by profession, specializing in electricity, he began working at the Energy and Water Company of Gabon (SEEG) in 1972, initially as assistant to the Technical Director. He rose rapidly at SEEG and became its Director-General in 1974, remaining in that post until 1981. He was also a ministerial delegate and adviser to President Bongo from 1978 to 1981.

Divungi Di Ndinge then served in the government as Minister of Energy and Hydraulic Resources from 1981 to 1990; he was a member of the ruling Gabonese Democratic Party (PDG) during that time. He joined the opposition in 1990, becoming Secretary-General of ADERE in 1993. He was the ADERE candidate in the December 1993 presidential election; he announced his candidacy on 12 October 1993, and in the election he received 2.2% of the vote.

After the 1993 election, ADERE joined the Presidential Majority. Divungi Di Ndinge became Mayor of Mouila in 1996, and he was also elected to the National Assembly as an ADERE candidate in Ngounié Province in the December 1996 parliamentary election. He was then appointed by Bongo as Vice-President of Gabon in May 1997 and consequently stepped down from his posts as Mayor of Mouila and as a Deputy in the National Assembly. In his role as Vice-President, he acted as the deputy of the President of the Republic, but he was not the constitutional successor to the Presidency in the event of a vacancy in the office. Following the re-election of President Bongo in the December 1998 presidential election, he resigned as required by the constitution, but was reappointed on 23 January 1999 after Bongo took office for his new term.

Divungi Di Ndinge survived an alleged assassination attempt at the Mouila airport on 20 January 2003. Following the November 2005 presidential election, Bongo reappointed him as Vice-President in January 2006.

On 10 October 2007, Divungi Di Ndinge was evacuated to the American Hospital in Neuilly-sur-Seine, near Paris, due to what was described as "sudden depression". Later in 2007, on the occasion of the 40th anniversary of Bongo's rule, Divungi Di Ndinge said that Bongo had been "able to establish a strong bond with [his] people based on dialogue and tolerance".

=== 2009 events ===
Bongo's wife, Edith Lucie Bongo, died in March 2009. Following her death, it was announced on Gabonese television on 6 May 2009 that Bongo was "temporarily suspending his activities" as President in order to "regain strength and rest". The announcement stressed that Bongo had been deeply affected by the illness and death of his wife, and it said that Divungi Di Ndinge was taking over presidential duties while Bongo's activities were suspended. Divungi Di Ndinge represented Gabon at the inauguration of South African President Jacob Zuma on 9 May 2009.

Bongo died in a Spanish hospital on 8 June 2009. Under the terms of the constitution, Senate President Rose Francine Rogombé then took office as Interim President on 10 June and Divungi Di Ndinge accordingly ceased to exercise presidential powers. Although he resigned, as required by the constitution, following Bongo's death, Rogombé reappointed him as Vice-President on 27 June 2009. This was believed to be part of Rogombé's apparent policy of preserving the political, ethnic, and regional balance of state institutions crafted by Bongo during her interim presidency.

Divungi Di Ndinge said on 21 July that he would not be a candidate in the 30 August 2009 presidential election. At its Fourth Extraordinary Congress, ADERE declined to endorse any candidate, with Divungi Di Ndinge calling on party activists to vote according to their conscience at the conclusion of the congress on 2 August 2009.

After Bongo's son, Ali Bongo Ondimba, won the presidential election and took office on 16 October 2009, he dismissed Divungi Di Ndinge from his post as Vice-President. In Mouila, Divungi Di Ndinge opened a hotel called Mukab on 19 December 2009; the building was formerly a residence belonging to him.

At a plenary session on 15 January 2010, ADERE decided to rejoin the Presidential Majority, which it had left in mid-2009, while expressing support for the reforms instituted by President Bongo since he took office. Divungi Di Ndinge was an opposition leader at the time of the August 2016 presidential election; in the midst of the violence that followed the announcement of Bongo's re-election, he was one of the opposition leaders briefly detained at the campaign headquarters of opposition candidate Jean Ping.

== Personal life ==
Didjob Divungi Di Ndinge is the younger brother of Pierre Claver Divounguy, who was for a time the Mayor of Port-Gentil.

Political offices
Preceded by Léon Mébiame	Vice President of Gabon; 1997–2009	Succeeded by Position abolished
Preceded by Omar Bongo	President of Gabon; Acting; 2009	Succeeded by Rose Francine Rogombé; Acting
