= Emile Doumba =

Gabonese politician

Emile Doumba (born 29 October 1944) is a Gabonese politician. After heading the Banque Internationale pour le Commerce et l'Industrie du Gabon (BICIG), he was Minister of Finance from 1999 to 2002, then Minister of the Forest Economy from 2002 to 2009. He was briefly Minister of Urban and Regional Planning from June 2009 to July 2009 and Minister of Energy, Hydraulic Resources, and New Energies from July 2009 to October 2009. Since October 2009, he has been Minister for Relations with Parliament and the Constitutional Institutions, Regional Integration, and NEPAD, in charge of Human Rights.

== BICIG career and appointment as Finance Minister ==
Doumba was born in Libreville and began working at BICIG in September 1972, becoming its Director-General in 1980. After about 19 years in the latter post, he was appointed to the government as Minister of the Economy, Finance, Budget, and Privatization on 25 January 1999. Considered a competent and respected technocrat, Doumba was appointed as Minister of Finance to resolve a fiscal crisis caused by decreased oil revenue and overspending. It was thought that his reputation abroad could be helpful in the refinancing of Gabon's external debt. Although Doumba was successful, some other members of the regime disliked his reliance on austerity measures, concerned that their own interests could be adversely affected.

== Political career since 2001 ==
In the December 2001 parliamentary election, Doumba was elected to the National Assembly as a candidate of the Gabonese Democratic Party (PDG) in Ogooué-Lolo Province; after the election, he was moved to the post of Minister of the Forest Economy, Water and Fishing, in charge of the Environment and the Protection of Nature, on 27 January 2002. President Omar Bongo's decision to remove him from the Ministry of Finance was attributed to the opposition his austerity measures had engendered among other members of the regime. Doumba's portfolio was altered on 21 January 2006, when he was appointed as Minister of the Forest Economy, Water, Fishing, and National Parks, again on 28 December 2007, when he was appointed as Minister of the Forest Economy, Water, and Fishing, and finally on 14 January 2009, when he was appointed as simply Minister of the Forest Economy.

After more than seven years as Minister of the Forest Economy, he was instead appointed as Minister of Urban and Regional Planning (Aménagement du territoire) and the Evaluation of Public Policy on 19 June 2009, following the death of President Bongo. He was then moved to the post of Minister of Energy, Hydraulic Resources, and New Energies on 22 July 2009.

After Bongo's son, Ali Bongo Ondimba, won the 30 August 2009 presidential election, Doumba was moved to the post of Minister for Relations with Parliament and the Constitutional Institutions, Regional Integration, and NEPAD, in charge of Human Rights, on 17 October 2009.
