= Rose Francine Rogombé =

Gabonese politician (1942–2015)

Acting President of Gabon
- In office 10 June 2009 – 16 October 2009
- Prime Minister: Jean Eyeghé Ndong; Paul Biyoghé Mba
- Vice President: Didjob Divungi Di Ndinge
- Preceded by: Didjob Divungi Di Ndinge (acting)
- Succeeded by: Ali Bongo

3rd President of the Senate of Gabon
- In office 16 October 2009 – 27 February 2015
- Preceded by: Léonard Andjembé (acting)
- Succeeded by: Lucie Milebou Aubusson
- In office 17 February 2009 – 10 June 2009
- Preceded by: René Radembino Coniquet
- Succeeded by: Léonard Andjembé (acting)

Personal details
- Born: Rose Francine Etomba; 20 September 1942 Lambaréné, French Equatorial Africa (now Gabon)
- Died: 10 April 2015 (aged 72) Paris, France
- Party: PDG
- Spouse: Jacques Rogombé

Rose Francine Rogombé (née Etomba; 20 September 1942 – 10 April 2015) was a Gabonese politician who was acting president of Gabon from June to October 2009, following the death of long-time President Omar Bongo. She constitutionally succeeded Bongo due to her role as president of the Senate, a post to which she was elected in February 2009. She was a lawyer by profession and a member of the Gabonese Democratic Party (PDG). Rogombé was the first female head of state of Gabon. After her interim presidency, she returned to her post as President of the Senate.

== Early life and career ==
Rose Francine Etomba, a member of the Galwa ethnic group, was born in Lambaréné, French Equatorial Africa (now Gabon), on 20 September 1942. After studying in France, she worked as a magistrate in Gabon. She also served in the government as Secretary of State for the Advancement of Women and Human Rights during the 1980s. She left politics during the transition to multiparty politics in the early 1990s, instead devoting herself to law; she eventually became Vice-President of the Special Criminal Court. In 2007, she received a degree in theology.

== 2008 local elections and 2009 Senate election ==
In the April 2008 local elections, Rogombé was elected as a municipal councillor in Lambaréné; she was subsequently elected as a Senator from Lambaréné in the January 2009 Senate election. Following the latter election, she was elected as President of the Senate on 16 February 2009, receiving the support of 90 of the 99 Senators who voted.

Rogombé, who was nicknamed the "iron lady", was a somewhat obscure figure when President Bongo effectively selected her to become President of the Senate, and her selection reportedly surprised many in the PDG leadership. Despite her relative obscurity, she was reportedly familiar with the operation of political power in Gabon, being close to Bongo and a friend of the family of Georges Rawiri, a prominent politician who became President of the Senate before his death in 2006.

== Presidency ==
As President of the Senate, Rogombé was the constitutionally designated successor to the Presidency of the Republic in the event of a vacancy in the latter office; if this occurred, she was to serve only in an interim capacity prior to the holding of a new presidential election, in which she would not be allowed to run. Following the death of President Omar Bongo on 8 June 2009, the Constitutional Court designated Rogombé as interim President on 9 June, and her swearing in was scheduled for the following day. In her capacity as interim President, the Constitutional Court said that Rogombé, unlike an elected President, would not have the power to dissolve the National Assembly or call a referendum. A new presidential election was required within 30 to 45 days, according to the Gabonese constitution, although it was considered very likely that it would be delayed beyond that point due to the need to update the voter rolls.

Rogombé was sworn in on 10 June 2009, in the presence of members of the Constitutional Court, government, Senate, and National Assembly, as well as foreign diplomats. She took the oath after a minute of silence in Bongo's memory, swearing "to devote all my strength to the good of the Gabonese people, with the aim of promoting its well-being and protecting it from all harm, to respect and defend the constitution and a state of law, and conscientiously to carry out my duties and to be fair before everyone". Internet access had been cut and television channels played only religious music following the announcement of Bongo's death.

After Rogombé assumed the Presidency of the Republic, Léonard Andjembé, the First Vice-President of the Senate, succeeded her as President of the Senate in an interim capacity.

In the presidential election held on 30 August 2009, PDG candidate Ali Bongo was victorious according to official results. Bongo was sworn in as President on 16 October 2009, and Rogombé returned to her post in the Senate on 20 October, taking over from Andjembé. There was no provision in the constitution specifically enabling her to return to her former post, but it was believed that Rogombé's resumption of duties in the Senate could constitute a precedent in that regard. In recognition of her work in leading Gabon through the early presidential election, Marcel Sandoungou, the oldest Senator, presented her with a medal of honor on the occasion of her return to the Senate. She said that the Senate was ready to work with Bongo as he pursued his planned reforms.

== Post-Presidency ==
Rogombé distributed 23,000 toys to children in Lambaréné on 30 January 2010 in a belated celebration of Christmas.

Following the December 2014 Senate election, Lucie Milebou Aubusson was elected to succeed Rogombé as President of the Senate on 27 February 2015.

Rogombé died on 10 April 2015 at a hospital in Paris, where she had gone for medical treatment a few days earlier.

Political offices
Preceded by Didjob Divungi Di Ndinge; Acting	President of Gabon; Acting; 2009	Succeeded by Ali Bongo Ondimba
