= Yvette Chassagne =

French politician (1922–2007)

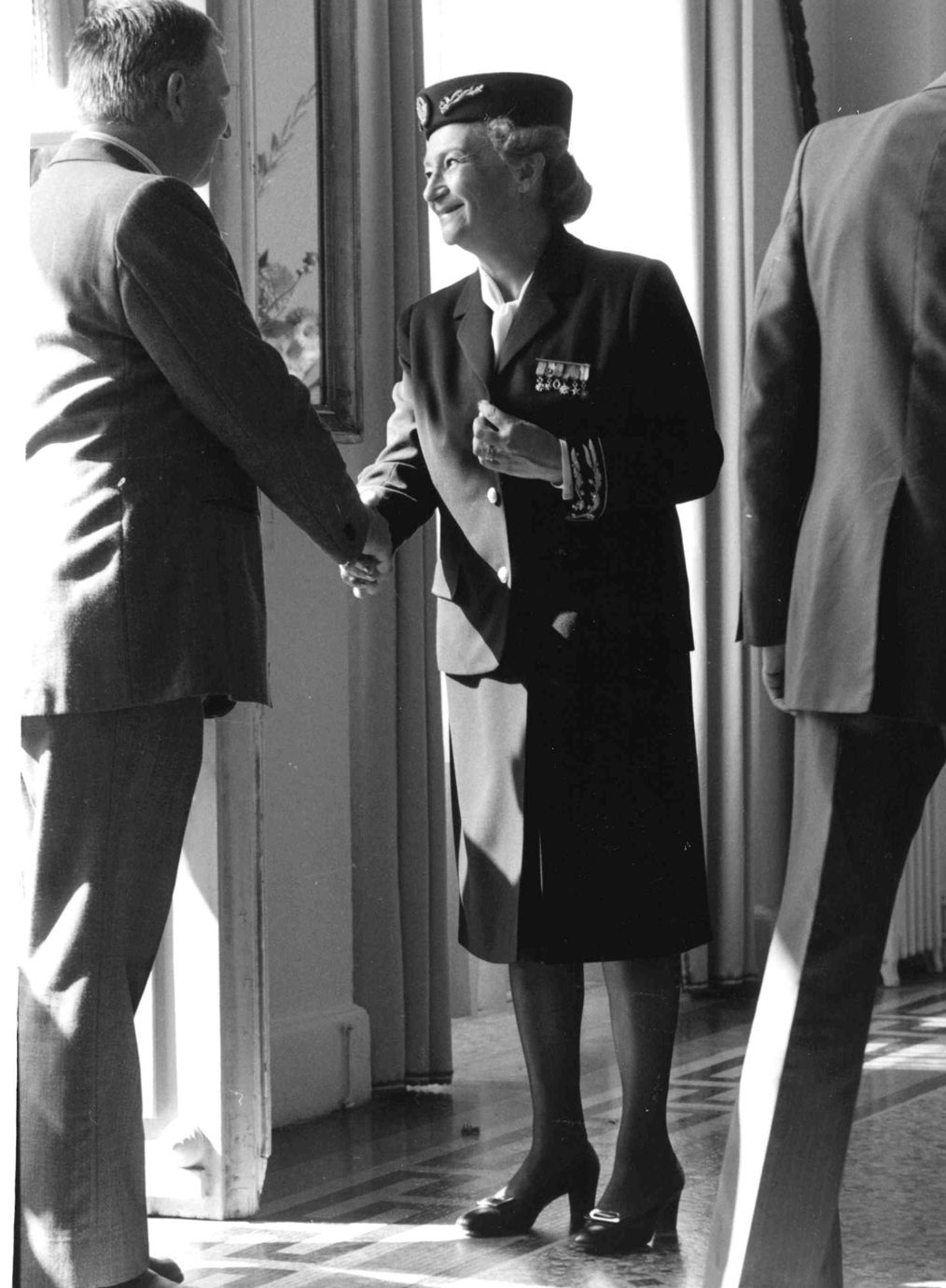
Yvette Chassagne, September 6th 1981

Yvette Madeleine Chassagne ( 28 March 1922 – 4 September 2007) was a French civil servant. She was the first woman to hold the position of prefect in France.

== Life ==
The daughter of André Brunetière and Lily Barrière, she was born Yvette Madeleine Brunetière in Bordeaux and originally wanted to become an archaeologist.

From 1943 to 1944, during the German occupation of France, she was part of a French Resistance network that produced false identity papers and warned Jewish families of impending raids.

After the war, she was one of the three first women to enter the École nationale d'administration. Chassagne next worked as a civil administrator for the French Ministry of the Armed Forces. She then was employed by the Insurance division at the Ministry of Finance, later becoming assistant director and then "conseiller maître" (master auditor) at the Court of Audit.

In 1981, she was named prefect for Loir-et-Cher by François Mitterrand. After leaving that post, she was president of the Union des assurances de Paris from 1983 to 1987. She subsequently served as president of the Association Prévention Routière. From 1988 to 1994, she served as advisor to the president of Club Med. She was elected to the municipal council for Narbonne in 2001.

She married Jean Chassagne; the couple had two children but later divorced.

== Honors ==
She was named a Commander in the French Legion of Honor, a Grand Officer in the National Order of Merit and a Grand Officer in the Order of Merit of the Italian Republic. Chassagne was named to the national orders of a number of African countries including the Ivory Coast, Senegal, the Central African Republic, Cameroon, Mali and Niger, also becoming a Commander in the Order of the Equatorial Star of Gabon.

== Death ==
She died in Narbonne at the age of 85.
