= Paul Gondjout =

Gabonese politician (1912–1990)

Paul Marie Indjendjet Gondjout

Member of the Senate of France
- In office 24 July 1949 – 7 June 1958

President of the National Assembly of Gabon
- In office March 1957 – February 1961
- Preceded by: Post established
- Succeeded by: Louis Bigmann

President of the Economic Council
- In office 1962–1964

President of the National Assembly of Gabon
- In office April 1975 – February 1980
- Preceded by: Georges Aleka Damas
- Succeeded by: Augustin Boumah

Personal details
- Born: 4 June 1912 Gabon
- Died: 1 July 1990 (aged 78) Libreville, Gabon
- Party: Gabonese Democratic Bloc

Paul Marie Indjendjet Gondjout (4 June 1912 – 1 July 1990) was a Gabonese politician and civil servant, and the father of Laure Gondjout, another prominent Gabonese politician. Gondjout was a member of the Mpongwe ethnic group, and served in the French colonial administration from 1928, and founded the Cercle amical et mutualiste des évolués de Port-Gentil in 1943. He was a delegate to the French Senate from 1949 to 1958, and founded the Gabonese Democratic Bloc (BDG). In 1954, Léon M'ba joined the party and eventually overthrew Gondjout as leader.

In 1960, then President M'ba reshuffled the government without consulting Parliament. When Gondjout filed a motion of censure he was charged with attempting a coup d'état and sentenced to two years in prison. Following his release, M'ba appointed him to the largely symbolic post of President of the Economic Council, in part to silence the threat he represented.

Gondjout served as Minister of State during the abortive 1964 Gabon coup d'état but was acquitted of all charges during his subsequent trial. He lived outside public view from his 1966 acquittal to his death on 1 July 1990 and there is little record of his life during this period.

== Early life and political career ==
Gondjout was born on 4 June 1912, to a Mpongwe family. He had a younger brother named Edouard. The elder Gondjout began his service in the French colonial administration in 1928. In 1943 he founded the Cercle amical et mutualiste des évolués de Port-Gentil (roughly translated as Mutual Friends for the Evolution of Port-Gentil), an organization that encouraged and utilised the talents of educated Gabonese. With the assistance of Mpongwe businesspeople, In 1945 he established the Gabonese Democratic Party alongside Emile Issembe.

Gondjout was elected to the Senate of France on 24 July 1949 and re-elected on 18 May 1952—both times as an independent candidate—serving until the end of his term on 7 June 1958. On 18 December 1953, he became the father of Laure Gondjout. She would later become a prominent politician as would his son, Vincent de Paul Gondjout, and nephew, Georges Rawiri.

In August 1953 Gondjout's PDG merged with the Gabonese Mixed Committee to form the Gabonese Democratic Bloc (BDG). Over the course of the following seven years, the party published a newspaper which caught the eye of the aspiring politician Léon M'ba, whom Gondjout had earlier helped to elect to the Gabonese council of government. The two formed an alliance supported by the Mpongwe business community, the wealthy coastal Fangs (like M'ba), and the French, which managed to overpower Jean-Hilaire Aubame and fellow members of the Gabonese Democratic and Social Union. Gondjout, the self-appointed secretary of the BDG, decreed M'ba to be the secretary-general. He and M'ba both believed that Gabon should not have full political independence, stating shortly before it was obtained:

I affirm my belief that it would be premature now for Gabon to achieve total independence, for this would precipitate it irreparably into anarchy or, what would be even worse, into a sort of neocolonialism.

M'ba overthrew Gondjout as head of the BDG and Goundjout aligned with Aubame on several issues, such as opposing M'ba's amount of power. Nonetheless, when Gabon gained its independence on 17 August 1960 Gondjout was named President of the National Assembly by the new President of Gabon, Leon M'ba. In November 1960 or 1961, Gondjout called for a constitutional amendment to allow him more executive power. When M'ba reshuffled his cabinet without consulting Parliament, Gondjout filed a motion of censure. He supposedly hoped to benefit from a balance of power modified to his own advantage, and to model Gabon after the Western democracies. M'ba, who did not share these ideas, reacted repressively.

On 16 November, under the pretext of a conspiracy, M'ba declared a state of emergency, ordering the internment of eight BDG opponents and the dissolution of the National Assembly the day after. Electors were asked to vote again on 12 February 1961. Gondjout himself was sentenced to two years in prison. He was imprisoned in a remote village under house arrest, where he was supplied, according to U.S. ambassador to Gabon, Charles Darlington, "with all the whisky and beer he [could] drink and all the girls he want[ed]". Unable to fulfill his position, it was given to Louis Bigmann. Upon Gondjout's release, M'ba appointed him to the mostly symbolic post of President of the Economic Council, in part to silence any threat to M'ba's power.

== 1964 Gabon coup d'état ==
During the night of 17 February and the early morning of 18 February 1964, 150 members of the Gabonese military, gendarmerie, and police, headed by Lieutenant Jacques Mombo and Valére Essone, seized the presidential palace. They arrested President of the National Assembly Louis Bigmann, French commanders Claude Haulin and Major Royer, several ministers, and President M'ba, who was dragged from his bed at gunpoint. On Radio Libreville, the military announced to the Gabonese people that a coup d'état had taken place, asked for technical assistance, and told the French not to interfere in this matter. M'ba was forced to broadcast a speech acknowledging his defeat, in which he said, "The D-Day is here, the injustices are beyond measure, these people are patient, but their patience has limits. It came to a boil."

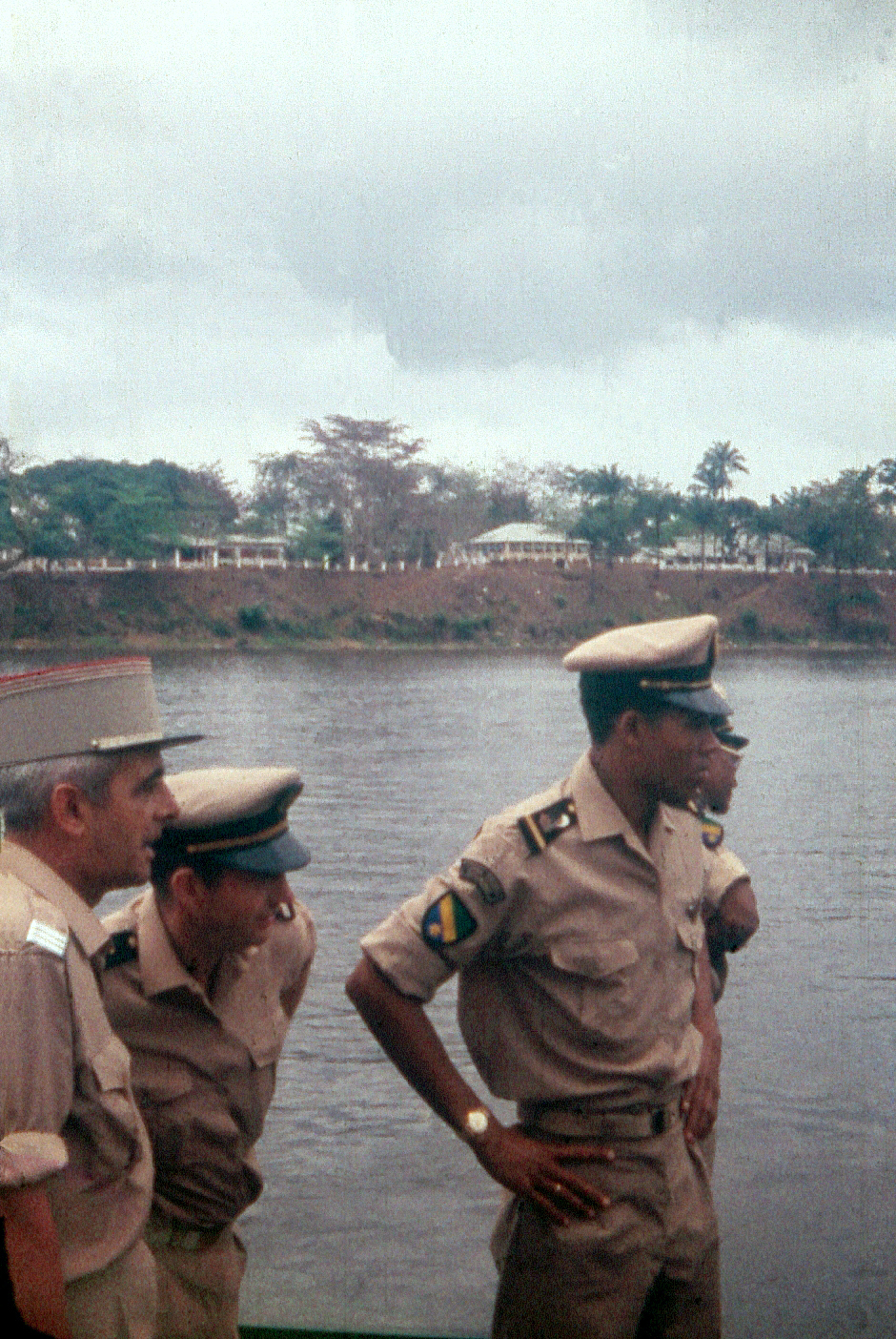
Gabonese and French military officers pictured in 1959.

No blood was shed during the event, and when the Gabonese people did not respond violently the military interpreted this as a sign of approval. Aubame was offered the presidency of the newly formed provisional government. The government was composed of civilian politicians from both the UDSG and BDG, such as Gondjout. During the coup, he served as Minister of State. The coup's leaders were content at restoring security for the civilians. The small Gabonese army did not intervene; composed mostly of French officers, they remained in their barracks.

Second Lieutenant Ndo Edou gave instructions to transfer M'ba to Ndjolé, Aubame's electoral stronghold. However, due to heavy rain, the deposed president and his captors took shelter in an unknown village. The next morning they decided to take him over the easier road to Lambaréné. Several hours later, they returned to Libreville. The new head of government contacted French ambassador Paul Cousseran, to assure him that the property of foreign nationals would be protected and to request against French military intervention. In Paris, President Charles de Gaulle decided against the plea.

M'ba was one of France's most loyal African allies, and during a visit to France in 1961, declared, "all Gabonese have two fatherlands: France and Gabon." Moreover, under his regime, Europeans were particularly well treated. The French authorities therefore decided, in accordance with signed Franco-Gabon agreements, to restore the legitimate government. Intervention could not commence without a formal request to the Head of State of Gabon. Since M'ba was imprisoned, the French contacted the Vice President of Gabon, Paul-Marie Yembit, who had not been arrested. However, he remained unaccounted for; therefore, they decided to compose a predated letter confirming their intervention, that Yembit would later sign. Less than 24 hours later, French troops stationed in Dakar and Brazzaville landed in Libreville and restored M'ba to power. During the operation, a French soldier and 15 to 25 Gabonese died.

== Post coup d'état ==
Aubame and Gondjout fled Libreville, but were captured sometime before 20 February. In August a trial of the rebels and provisional government was opened in Lambaréné. A "state of precations" was imposed, which decreed that local government keep surveillance on suspected troublemakers and, if necessary, order curfew, and special permits were required to travel through the town. The trial was held in a school building overlooking the Ogooue River, which was near Albert Schweitzer's hospital. Space at the hearing was limited, so members of the public were disallowed from attending. Permits were required to attend the trial, and family members were restricted to one permit each. Press coverage was limited, and journalists were allowed only if they represented a high-profile news agency. In addition, there were restrictions on the defence of the accused.

During a trial which carried the death sentence as a maximum, the prosecution called 64 separate witnesses. Aubame claimed he had formed his provisional government in a constitutional manner; at the request of members of the "putschists". He argued that the French intervention was effectively an illegal act of interference; a belief shared by both Gondjout and the former education minister, Jean Mare Ekoh. On 9 September, without consulting M'ba, Leon Auge handed down a verdict acquitting both Ekoh and Gondjout of all charges.

Little is known of Goundjout's life between his 1966 acquittal and death on 1 July 1990, in Libreville. He is buried in Libreville near his wife Odette (d. 2006), a former fashion model. A secondary school has been established in his name.

== Sources ==
- Appiah, Kwame Anthony; Gates, Henry Louis Jr., eds. (1999), Africana: The Encyclopedia of the African and African American Experience, New York: Basic Books, ISBN 978-0-465-00071-5, OCLC 41649745.
- Bernault, Florence (1996), Démocraties ambiguës en Afrique centrale: Congo-Brazzaville, Gabon, 1940-1965 (in French), Paris: Karthala, ISBN 978-2-86537-636-0, OCLC 36142247.
- Biteghe, Moïse N’Solé (1990), Echec aux militaires au Gabon en 1964 (in French), Paris: Chaka, ISBN 978-2-907768-06-1, OCLC 29518659.
- Darlington, Charles Francis; Darlington, Alice B. (1968), African Betrayal, New York, New York: D. McKay Co., OCLC 172139.
- Carter, Gwendolen Margaret; Sklar, Richard L. (1966), National Unity and Regionalism in Eight African States: Nigeria, Niger, the Congo, Gabon, Central African Republic, Chad, Uganda, Ethiopia, Ithaca, New York: Cornell University Press, OCLC 413211.
- Gardinier, David E. (1994), Historical Dictionary of Gabon (2nd ed.), Metuchen, New Jersey: Scarecrow Press, ISBN 978-0-8108-1435-6, OCLC 7462387.
- Keese, Alexander (2004), "L'évolution du leader indigène aux yeux des administrateurs français: Léon M'Ba et le changement des modalités de participation au pouvoir local au Gabon, 1922-1967", Afrique & Histoire (in French), 2 (1): 141–170, doi:10.3917/afhi.002.0141, ISSN 1764-1977.
- Matthews, Ronald (1966), African Powder Keg: Revolt and Dissent in Six Emergent Nations, London: The Bodley Head, OCLC 246401461.
- Reed, Michael C. (June 1987), "Gabon: A Neo-Colonial Enclave of Enduring French Interest", The Journal of Modern African Studies, 25 (2), Cambridge University Press: 283–320, doi:10.1017/S0022278X00000392, JSTOR 161015, OCLC 77874468, S2CID 153880808.
- Yates, Douglas A. (1996), The rentier state in Africa: oil rent dependency and neocolonialism in the Republic of Gabon, Trenton, New Jersey: Africa World Press, ISBN 978-0-86543-521-6, OCLC 34543635.
