= Huguette Nyana Ekoume =

Gabonese lawyer and politician

- Official portrait, 2026

President of the Senate of Gabon
- Incumbent
- Assumed office 17 December 2025
- Preceded by: Paulette Missambo

Member of the Senate of Gabon for Makokou
- Incumbent
- Assumed office 17 December 2025

Personal details
- Born: Gabon
- Party: UDB
- Education: University of Lomé

Huguette Yvonne Nyana Ekoume is a Gabonese lawyer and politician who has been President of the country's Senate since December 2025.

== Early life and education ==
Ekoume is from Ogooué-Ivindo province. She graduated from the Léon Mba National High School in 1996 and completed a master's degree in public law from the University of Lomé in Togo in 2003. She graduated from Libreville's National School of Administration in 2005.

== Career ==
Ekoume has had a twenty-year career in public service and unlike many of her predecessors, does not come from an established political family. She worked as a legal and administrative officer at the General Inspectorate of Services of the Ministry of Economy, Budget and Privatization from 2005 to 2014, and then as an advisor to the Prime Minister from 2014 to 2016. She was a technical advisor at the Ministry of Budget and at the State Employee's Pension Fund, including as Director of Family Benefits from 2016 to 2017. She was then a legal advisor to the Directorate General. From March 2017 until October 2023 she headed the State Legal Agency, defending Gabon's financial interests in national and international disputes. She was then Technical Advisor to the Minister of Public Accounts from October 2023 to February 2024 before serving as Secretary-General at the Ministry of Economy, Finance, Debt and State Holdings and was particularly focused on combating inflation.

Since 2002, Ekoume has been a member of the International Chamber of Commerce's Arbitration Commission, as well as a part-time lecturer at the Preparatory School for Administrative Careers.

Ekoume has not previously held political office, but is a member of the Democratic Union of Builders (UDB). She was elected President of the Senate unopposed on December 17, 2025, and is the fourth woman to occupy the role. Her election was noted as signifying a "political rebalancing" within the upper house, and she is viewed as a "technocrat" who favours administrative expertise over political lineage. Under the Constitution of Gabon, her role means she would assume interim presidency of the nation in the event of the President's incapacity.

At the opening of the Parliament's first ordinary session in March 2026, Ekoume said her election reflected the stated desire of her party's founding president, now President of the Republic, Brice Oligui Nguema to implement decentralization and to make the constitutional mission of representing local communities a practical reality.

== Personal life ==
Ekoume is married to Awori Onanga.
