= Marie-Madeleine Mborantsuo =

Gabonese lawyer

President of the Constitutional Court of Gabon
- Incumbent
- Assumed office 1991

Personal details
- Born: 18 June 1955 (age 71) Franceville, Gabon
- Education: Omar Bongo University; Panthéon-Assas University; Aix-Marseille University
- Occupation: Lawyer, judge, professor
- Known for: President of the Constitutional Court of Gabon

Marie-Madeleine Mborantsuo OEE ONM (born 18 April 1955) is a Gabonese lawyer who is the former romantic partner of Omar Bongo, the long-standing authoritarian ruler of Gabon.

She is the president of the Constitutional Court of Gabon (Cour Constitutionnelle de la Republique Gabonaise) since its foundation in 1991. During her tenure on the court, she helped ensure the Bongo family's rule over Gabon through her rulings, in particular in relation to fraudulent elections.

She owns six properties in Dubai, valued at more than $3 million in 2024. In 2013, she purchased a townhouse in the Silver Spring neighborhood of Washington D.C. for $1.5 million in cash. She reportedly owns properties in France and South Africa.

== Personal life and education ==
Mborantsuo was born in Franceville on 18 June 1955. Her parents were Jean Dambangoye and Berthe Nouo. She won a "Miss Franceville" beauty pageant, and became the lover of the then president Omar Bongo, with whom she had two children. She studied law at the National University of Gabon (later Omar Bongo University), then gained a Masters in Public Finance at University of Paris II and a doctorate in constitutional law in 2005 at the University of Aix-en-Provence. Her doctoral thesis title was Cours constitutionnelles africaines et État de droit.

== Career ==
From 1983 to 1991 she was president of the Cour de Comptes of the Supreme Court of Gabon and taught law at Omar Bongo University. After taking part in the national conference of 1990 she was one of the writers of the country's new constitution, and became president of the newly-established constitutional court (the Constitutional Court of Gabon), a post she still holds as of January 2019.

It has been suggested that she "contributed to the Constitutional Court's loss of legitimacy as an impartial institution" by making controversial decisions on the allegedly fraudulent presidential elections of 1993, 2009 and 2016 in which her former lover and then her step-son Ali Bongo Ondimba retained and gained the post of president.

== Selected publications ==
- La contribution des Cours constitutionnelles à l'Etat de Droit en Afrique, (2007, Economica: ISBN 9782717853070)
- La Constitution de la République Gabonaise
