= Georges Aleka Damas =

Gabonese politician (1902–1982)

- Georges Aleka Damas in 1961

President of the National Assembly of Gabon
- In office April 1964 – April 1975
- Preceded by: Louis Bigmann
- Succeeded by: Paul Gondjout

Personal details
- Born: 18 November 1902
- Died: 4 May 1982 (aged 79)
- Party: Gabonese Democratic Party

Georges Aleka Damas (18 November 1902 – 4 May 1982) was a Gabonese politician who served as President of the National Assembly of Gabon from April 1964 to April 1975. He also composed Gabon's national anthem, "La Concorde".

== Life and career ==
A Mpongwe born in Libreville and educated at the Ecole Montfort, he worked as a bank clerk from 1924 to 1939, then as head bookkeeper for the Compagnie Maritime des Chargeurs Réunis until 1959.

He first came to public attention in 1934, with a series of letters to the Etoile de l'AEF opposing special rights for the métis. In 1943, the Free French appointed him to represent Gabon in the governor-general's administrative council, a role which lasted until 1946, then from 1948 to 1954 was an advisor to the governor of Gabon. He was also active in the formation of labor unions, the CGT-Force Ouvrière, and in the politics of the territory.

He was elected to the municipal commission of Libreville in 1956, a post he held until 1963, and in 1959 represented Gabon in the Economic and Social Council of the French Community. From 1961 to 1964 he served as ambassador to the European Common Market, to the Benelux countries, and to West Germany.

In April 1964 Damas was elected to the National Assembly of Gabon, and its members selected him as President of the National Assembly, a role in which he served until April 1975. On 29 May 1968 he was named president of the Bureau of the newly formed Gabonese Democratic Party, the country's sole legal party, and was later its treasurer-general. His final role before his retirement was as advisor to President Omar Bongo, from April 1975 to 1977.

He was honored on a 90-franc postage stamp of Gabon in 1985, with his portrait in front of the score to "La Concorde".
