= Louis Bigmann =

Former President of the National Assembly of Gabon

President of the National Assembly of Gabon
- In office 12 February 1961 – 12 April 1964
- Preceded by: Paul Gondjout
- Succeeded by: Georges Aleka Damas

Personal details
- Born: 1897
- Died: 1986 (aged 88–89)

Louis-Emile Bigmann (1897–1986) was a Gabonese politician and former President of the National Assembly of Gabon.

== Early life and political career ==
A member of the Mpongwe people, he was born and lived in Baraka, Gabon. Bigmann attended the Ecole Montfort in Libreville, Gabon's capital. Noted Mpongwe critic of colonialism Laurent Antchouey and he founded the "L'Echo Gabonais" in Dakar in 1922.

Bigmann was appointed President of the National Assembly by Gabonese President Leon M'ba in 1961 while its former officeholder, Paul Gondjout, was incarcerated.

== 1964 Gabon coup d'état ==
During the night of 17 February and the early morning of 18 February 1964, 150 members of the Gabonese military, gendarmerie, and police, headed by Lieutenant Jacques Mombo and Valére Essone, seized the presidential palace. The gendarmes on duty claimed that this was but a military exercise. However, during the "exercise" the lieutenants dragged President M'ba from his bed at gunpoint. Bongo heard this noise and telephoned Bigmann to find out what had happened. Bigmann arrived at the presidential palace and asked the rebels what Bongo had asked him. At this point they opened the gates and arrested him too. The plotters subsequently arrested every member of the Gabonese cabinet except the respected technician André Gustave Anguilé. On Radio Libreville, the military announced to the Gabonese people that a coup d'état had taken place, asked for technical assistance, and told the French not to interfere in this matter. M'ba was forced to broadcast a speech acknowledging his defeat, in which he said, "The D-Day is here, the injustices are beyond measure, these people are patient, but their patience has limits. It came to a boil."

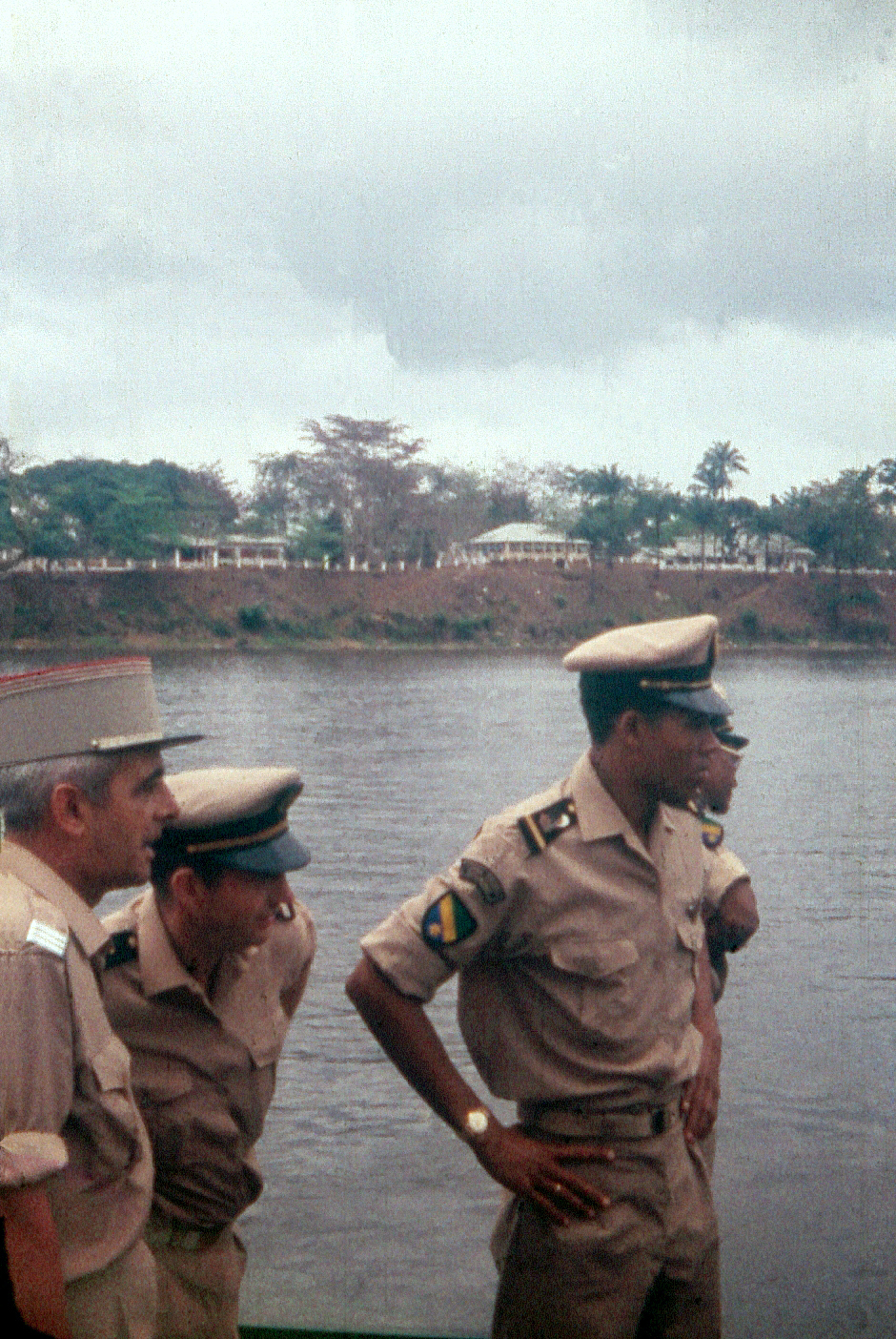
Gabonese and French military officers pictured in 1959.

No blood was shed during the event, and when the Gabonese people did not respond violently the military interpreted this as a sign of approval. Aubame was offered the presidency of the newly formed provisional government. The government was composed of civilian politicians from both the UDSG and BDG, such as Gondjout. During the coup, he served as Minister of State. The coup's leaders were content at restoring security for the civilians. The small Gabonese army did not intervene; composed mostly of French officers, they remained in their barracks.

The provisional government gave instructions to transfer M'ba to Aubame's electoral stronghold, Njolé. Due to heavy rain, the deposed president was sent to Lambaréné, 250 kilometres (160 mi) north of Libreville. The new head of government contacted French ambassador Paul Cousseran, to assure him that the property of foreign nationals would be protected and to request against French military intervention. In Paris, President Charles de Gaulle decided against the plea.

M'ba was one of France's most loyal African allies, and during a visit to France in 1961, declared, "all Gabonese have two fatherlands: France and Gabon." Moreover, under his regime, Europeans were particularly well treated. The French authorities therefore decided, in accordance with signed Franco-Gabon agreements, to restore the legitimate government. Intervention could not commence without a formal request to the Head of State of Gabon. Since M'ba was imprisoned, the French contacted the Vice President of Gabon, Paul-Marie Yembit, who had not been arrested. However, he remained unaccounted for; therefore, they decided to compose a predated letter confirming their intervention, that Yembit would later sign. Less than 24 hours later, French troops stationed in Dakar and Brazzaville landed in Libreville and restored M'ba to power. During the operation, a French soldier and 15 to 25 Gabonese died.

== Sources ==
- L'année francophone internationale. 2005 (in French). Québec: CIDEF-AFI. 2005. ISBN 2-922876-09-8. OCLC 316545842.
- Bernault, Florence (1996), Démocraties ambiguës en Afrique centrale: Congo-Brazzaville, Gabon, 1940-1965 (in French), Paris: Karthala, ISBN 2-86537-636-2, OCLC 36142247.
- Biteghe, Moïse N’Solé (1990), Echec aux militaires au Gabon en 1964 (in French), Paris: Chaka, ISBN 2-907768-06-9, OCLC 29518659.
- Darlington, Charles Francis; Darlington, Alice B. (1968), African Betrayal, New York, New York: D. McKay Co., OCLC 172139.
- Carter, Gwendolen Margaret; Sklar, Richard L. (1966), National Unity and Regionalism in Eight African States: Nigeria, Niger, the Congo, Gabon, Central African Republic, Chad, Uganda, Ethiopia, Ithaca, New York: Cornell University Press, OCLC 413211.
- Gardinier, David E. (1994), Historical Dictionary of Gabon (2nd ed.), Metuchen, New Jersey: Scarecrow Press, ISBN 0-8108-1435-8, OCLC 7462387.
- Keese, Alexander (2004), "L'évolution du leader indigène aux yeux des administrateurs français: Léon M'Ba et le changement des modalités de participation au pouvoir local au Gabon, 1922-1967", Afrique & Histoire (in French), 2 (1): 141–170, doi:10.3917/afhi.002.0141, ISSN 1764-1977.
