= Faustin Boukoubi =

Gabonese politician

President of the National Assembly of Gabon
- In office 11 January 2019 – 30 August 2023
- Preceded by: Richard Auguste Onouviet in April 2018
- Succeeded by: Jean-François Ndongou

Personal details
- Born: 20 March 1954 (age 72)
- Party: Gabonese Democratic Party

Faustin Boukoubi (born 20 March 1954) is a Gabonese politician who served as the President of the National Assembly of Gabon since 11 January 2019 and has been the Secretary-General of the Gabonese Democratic Party (PDG) since 2008. He previously served in the government of Gabon as Minister of Public Health from 1997 to 2004 and as Minister of Agriculture from 2004 to 2008.

== Education and early career ==
Boukoubi was born in Dolisie, located in Congo-Brazzaville, in 1954, and is from the Ogooué-Lolo Province of Gabon. He attended primary and secondary school at Koula-Moutou before studying at the National Institute of Management Sciences in Libreville, as well as the School of Administration and Management of Enterprises at Kobe University in Japan. He was a Research Officer at the Autonomous Absorption Fund from 1982 to 1984 and was Director of Public Debt from 1984 to 1990.

== Political career and government service ==
Boukoubi was appointed to the government as Secretary of State for Budget and Investments, working under the Minister of Finance, in 1990, and after four years in that post he was appointed as Minister-Delegate for Budget and Investments at the same ministry in 1994. He served only briefly as a Minister-Delegate before becoming the Deputy Director-General of the Gabonese Union of Banks later in 1994. He remained in the latter post until he was appointed to the government as Minister of Public Health and Population on 28 January 1997.

On 25 January 1999, Boukoubi was appointed as Minister-Delegate under the Minister of State for Public Health, Population, and Social Affairs, but he was quickly promoted back to the position of Minister of Public Health and Population on 10 February 1999. He was elected to the National Assembly in the December 2001 parliamentary election as a PDG candidate in Ogooué-Lolo Province and was reappointed as Minister of Public Health on 27 January 2002. Speaking to the Senate on 26 December 2003, he said that the health budget had been less than required to meet the needs of 20% of the population since 1998. He was moved to the position of Minister of Agriculture, Animal Husbandry, and Rural Development on 5 September 2004.

In the December 2006 parliamentary election, Boukoubi was elected to the National Assembly as the PDG candidate in Pana constituency, located in Ogooué-Lolo Province. He was promoted to the rank of Minister of State, while holding the same portfolio, on 25 January 2007, but he lost the title of Minister of State in the government named on 28 December 2007, while remaining Minister of Agriculture and Rural Development.

At the PDG's 9th Ordinary Congress, held on 19–21 September 2008, Boukoubi was elected as the party's Secretary-General; he officially succeeded Simplice Guedet Manzela as Secretary-General on 26 September. He then left his ministerial post when the next government was appointed on 7 October 2008.

Following the death of President Bongo in June 2009, Bongo's son, Ali Bongo Ondimba, was designated as the PDG candidate for the August 2009 presidential election. Boukoubi was seen as one of Ali Bongo's main allies.

In the December 2011 parliamentary election, Boukoubi easily won re-election to the National Assembly; he won the first seat for Pana and Haute-Lombo, receiving 99.39% of the vote according to preliminary results.

Boukoubi participated in the 2017 national political dialogue as a representative of the governing majority and acted one of the two co-presidents for the majority, along with Emmanuel Issoze Ngondet.
