= Minister of Finance and Economy (Gabon) =

Minister of Economy and Finance (French: Ministre de l'Economie et des Finances) is the person in charge of the public finances of Gabon, and current head of the ministry of economy and finance.

== Ministers responsible for finance ==
- André Gustave Anguilé, 1960–1965
- Léonard Badinga, 1965–1966
- Pierre Mebaley, 1966–1969
- Augustin Boumah, 1969–1972
- Paul Moukambi, 1972–1976
- Jérôme Okinda, 1976–1983
- Jean-Pierre Lemboumba-Lepandou, 1983–1990
- Léon Mébiame, 1990–1991
- Paul Toungui, 1991–1994
- Marcel Doupamby Matoka, 1994–1999
- Emile Doumba, 1999–2002
- Paul Toungui, 2002–2008
- Blaise Louembe, 2008–2012
- Rose Christiane Raponda, 2012–2014

== Ministers responsible for budget ==
- Christian Magnagna, 2014–2016
- Mathias Otounga Ossibadjouo, 2016–2017
- Jean-Fidèle Otandault, 2017–2019
- Roger Owono Mba, 2019
- Jean-Marie Ogandaga, December 2019 – 2020
- Sosthène Ossoungou Ndibangoye, 2020–2022
- Edith Ekiri Mounombi, 2022-2023
- Charles M'ba, 2023-Incumbent

== See also ==
- Government of Gabon
- Economy of Gabon
