= Sylvestre Ratanga =

Gabonese politician and diplomat

Sylvestre Augustin Ratanga (born 1945?) is a Gabonese politician and diplomat. He served as Gabon's Ambassador to Germany and was later the Secretary-General of the Gabonese Union for Democracy and Development (UGDD), an opposition party. Abandoning the UGDD, he then served in the government as Minister of Transport and Civil Aviation from January 2009 to October 2009, and he has been Chairman of the Board of the Gabonese Refining Company (Société gabonaise de raffinage, SOGARA) since October 2009.

== Political career ==
Ratanga was Director for International Organizations and Multilateral Cooperation Organizations at the Ministry of Foreign Affairs from March 1976 to February 1978. Subsequently he was Secretary-General of the Ministry of Foreign Affairs, and later he was Gabon's Ambassador to Germany. Shortly after Zacharie Myboto founded the UGDD, Ratanga joined the new party as its Vice-President in June 2005. He later became the UGDD's Permanent Secretary-General and additionally served as its National Secretary for Foreign Relations. At the time of the November 2005 presidential election, he was the coordinator of Myboto's campaign.

Ratanga briefly went on hunger strike in December 2005 to protest his inability to obtain a passport from the government, which would enable him to visit his family living abroad. The Directorate-General of Emigration and Immigration promptly issued him an ordinary passport, and although he still did not receive a diplomatic passport from the Ministry of Foreign Affairs, the issuing of an ordinary passport was sufficient for him to end his hunger strike.

President Omar Bongo appointed Ratanga, who was still serving as the Secretary-General of the UGDD, to the government as Minister of Transport and Civil Aviation on 14 January 2009. Ratanga accepted the post, although the UGDD had decided not to participate in the government. The UGDD immediately expelled Ratanga from the party, along with Paul Boundoukou-Latha, another UGDD member who had taken a lesser post in the government. Deriding the appointments, the UGDD described Ratanga's portfolio as "a hot potato that he was passed in the hope that it burns [his] fingers".

Ratanga's tasks as Minister of Transport and Civil Aviation included overseeing the construction of an airport in Libreville, a reform of legal regulations pertaining to the sector, and the improvement of old airports and weather stations. Speaking at a ceremony for the installation of new aviation and transport officials on 6 February 2009, Ratanga stressed the importance of innovation and performance.

Omar Bongo died in June 2009 and his son Ali Bongo took office as President in October 2009, after winning a disputed presidential election. As President, Ali Bongo dismissed Ratanga from the government on 17 October and then appointed him as Chairman of the Board of SOGARA on 19 October 2009. That move was part of a major reshuffling of the state administration. At SOGARA, he and Director-General Reteno Ndiaye were faced with the task of improving the company's very difficult financial situation. Ratanga and Ndiaye met with Julien Nkoghe Bekale, the Minister of Oil, on 29 October 2009 to discuss their plan for repairing SOGARA's finances.
