= Régis Onanga Ndiaye =

Gabonese politician

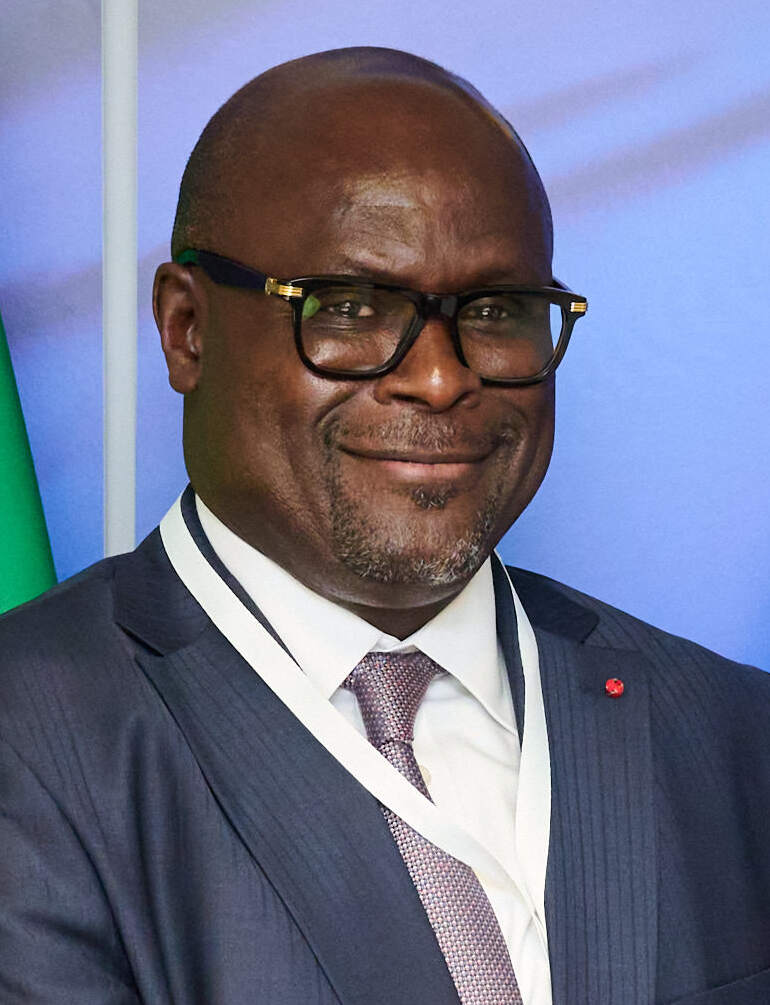
- Régis Onanga Ndiaye in 2025

President of the National Assembly of Gabon
- Incumbent
- Assumed office 17 November 2025
- Preceded by: Jean-François Ndongou

Member of the National Assembly for Etimboue
- Incumbent
- Assumed office 17 November 2025

Minister for Foreign Affairs
- In office 9 September 2023 – 14 November 2025
- President: Brice Oligui Nguema
- Prime Minister: Raymond Ndong Sima
- Preceded by: Hermann Immongault
- Succeeded by: François Ndong Obiang (acting)

Personal details
- Born: September 28, 1966 (age 59) Gabon
- Party: UDB
- Relatives: Brice Oligui Nguema (brother-in-law)
- Education: Paris Descartes University

Régis Onanga Ndiaye is a Gabonese politician and diplomat who has served as President of the National Assembly since 2025. A member of the Democratic Union of Builders (UDB), he previously served as Minister for Foreign Affairs from 2023 to 2025 and as Ambassador to Senegal from 2015 to 2023.

== Personal life ==
He is the brother-in-law of President Brice Oligui Nguema.
