= Louis-Gaston Mayila =

Gabonese politician (1947–2025)

President of the Union for the New Republic
- In office 2007–2025

Personal details
- Born: 25 January 1947 Boungounga, French Equatorial Africa
- Died: 4 February 2025 (aged 78) Rang-du-Fliers, France
- Party: Union for the New Republic
- Occupation: Politician
- Website: www.louisgastonmayila.com

Louis-Gaston Mayila (25 January 1947 – 4 February 2025) was a Gabonese politician. He was the President of the Union for the New Republic (UPRN), a political party, from 2007 to his death in 2025. He also served as a government minister multiple times including, Minister of Postal Services, Reform and Semi-Public Firms, Tourism, and National Parks from 1976 to 1978, and National Parks Minister of National Education from 1980 to 1987, Minister of Labor, Employment, Human Resources, and Professional Training from 1987 to 1989, and Minister of State for Labor, Employment, and Professional Training from 1989 to 1990. He was also Personal Adviser to the President of the Republic for Development and Public Investments from 1990 to 1992. He was also Minister of the Interior, Decentralization, and Mobile Security from 1995, President of the Economic and Social Council (CES) from 1997 to 2005, and Minister of National Solidarity, Social Affairs, Welfare and the Fight against Poverty from 2006 to 2007.

== Biography ==
=== Early life and political career ===
Mayila was born in Boungounga, Ngounie Province on 25 January 1947. He received an academic internship at the Shell Gabon oil company in 1972, and in 1973, became an official in charge of training and recruitment; he was also appointed Secretary-General of Civil and Commercial Aviation in the same year. He then became Director of the National School of Administration in 1974, and at the end of 1974 he became Deputy Personal Adviser to the President of Gabon, Omar Bongo. Subsequently, he was appointed Director of the Cabinet of the President of the Republic in 1975. While retaining that post, he obtained the rank of minister in 1976 and was assigned responsibility for posts and telecommunications; he was also placed in charge of relations with the National Timber Company of Gabon (Société Nationale des Bois du Gabon, SNBG). He held the position of Minister of Postal Services, Reform and Semi-Public Firms, Tourism, and National Parks until being dismissed from the government on 4 February 1978.

Mayila was Secretary-General of the Government with the rank of minister in 1980; subsequently he was Minister of National Education from late 1980 to 1987. He was then Minister of Labor, Employment, Human Resources, and Professional Training from 1987 to 1989, Minister of State for Labor, Employment, and Professional Training from 1989 to 1990, and Personal Adviser to the President of the Republic for Development and Public Investments from 1990 to 1992.

In 1992, Mayila resigned from his post as Personal Adviser to the President and founded a new party, the People's Unity Party (Parti de l'Unité du Peuple, PUP). However, his new party allied with the ruling Gabonese Democratic Party (PDG) and supported President Bongo's candidacy in the 1993 presidential election. Mayila participated in the negotiations that led to the signing of the Paris Accords between the government and the opposition in 1994 and was then appointed Minister-Delegate under the Prime Minister in charge of Decentralization and Mobile Security. He was subsequently promoted to the post of Minister of the Interior, Decentralization, and Mobile Security in early 1995.

Mayila became President of the CES in early 1997, and he rejoined the PDG in 2005. He was given the position of vice-president of the PDG. At the time of the November 2005 presidential election, he worked on Bongo's re-election campaign as President of the Commission for Gabonese Abroad. In early 2006, he was appointed to the government as Deputy Prime Minister for Social Affairs and left his post at the CES.

Mayila supported some independent candidates at the time of the December 2006 parliamentary election, although none of them were successful; he did not personally stand as a candidate. Feeling marginalized within the PDG, he threatened to quit in order to create a new party. On 28 February 2007, PDG Secretary-General Simplice Nguédet Manzéla publicly called on Mayila to abandon his threat and respect party discipline by discussing his complaints strictly within the party's internal structures.

On 16 July 2007, Mayila announced the formation of a new party, the UPRN, which was intended to be part of the Presidential Majority coalition of parties supporting President Bongo. Bongo promptly dismissed Mayila from the government in a decree issued on the same day, appointing Jean-François Ndongou to take over his portfolio. Mayila, still awaiting the legalization of the UPRN, met with Bongo on 3 October 2007 to explain the difficulties his new party was experiencing and "to resolve misunderstandings". On 12 January 2008, Mayila held a press conference to announce that the party had been legally recognized and would therefore participate in the April 2008 local elections. Mayila remained supportive of Bongo following his dismissal from the government; in his office, he kept a photograph of himself whispering into Bongo's ear. Speaking to the Associated Press in March 2008, he said that Gabon was "neither dictatorship nor democracy, neither paradise nor hell. We are something in between." While acknowledging the country's problems—"no roads, not enough schools, too much unemployment"—he stressed that Gabonese would "fix things on our own time, in our own way—peacefully—not through war."

Omar Bongo died in June 2009. As the President of the UPRN, Mayila backed opposition candidate Pierre Mamboundou for the 30 August 2009 presidential election; the UPRN was one of several parties to support Mamboundou in an effort to unite behind a single opposition candidate. Immediately following the coalition's selection of Mamboundou, Mayila told the press on 21 July 2009: "You have asked for a single candidate for the opposition ... I offer you hope, I offer you a new way for Gabon." Following the election, Mayila held a press conference on 31 August 2009 in which he claimed that Mamboundou had won the election with 39.15% of the vote. The other two main candidates, Ali-Ben Bongo and André Mba Obame, also claimed victory, but Mayila said that the figures he provided, which included a breakdown of votes from each province, "demonstrate[d] clearly" that Mamboundou was the winner.

=== Business career ===
Aside from politics, Mayila also served as president of numerous companies, notably national airlines. He was the President of Air Inter Gabon, COFMA (Compagnie Forestière de Tsamba Magotsi), AGAR, and Air Gabon.

=== Death ===
In 2024, Mayila died in Rang-du-Fliers, France, on 4 February 2025, from a medical condition at the age of 78.

== Awards ==
Mayila received many national awards for his service in politics, not only from Gabon but from other African nations and France. The official French titles are given below:

- Gabon – Grand Croix dans l'Ordre National du Mérite Gabonais
- Gabon – Grand Officier dans l'Ordre National du Mérite
- Gabon – Commandeur dans l'Ordre National de l’Étoile équatoriale du Gabon
- Gabon – Grand Officier dans l'Ordre du Mérite
- Gabon – Commandeur de Mérite
- Gabon – Grand Officier dans l'ordre de l'Étoile équatoriale
- France – Grand Officier dans l'Ordre National du Mérite
- France – Commandeur de la Légion d'Honneur
- France – Commandeur des Palmes Académiques
- Morocco – Commandeur du Wissam Al Alaoui
- Togo – Commandeur dans l'Ordre du Mono.
- Republic of the Congo – Commandeur du Mérite
