= Guy-Bertrand Mapangou =

Gabonese politician

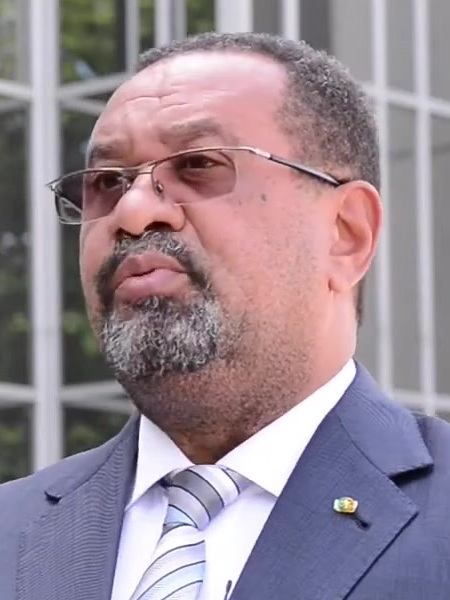
Guy-Bertrand Mapangou (2015)

Guy-Bertrand Mapangou is a Gabonese politician. He was Minister of Interior, Public Security, Immigration of the government of the former Prime Minister Pr Daniel ONA ONDO, the 28 January 2014. He was President of CNC Commission of National Communication since May 2012. He was Deputy Secretary-General and Spokesman of the Presidency of Gabon from October 2009 to January 2011 and he has been Minister-Delegate for State Reform since January 2011. Currently, he is the president of economic, social environmental council of Gabon.

== Professional and political career ==
Mapangou studied journalism in Lille and then worked as a journalist at the Africa No. 1 radio station in Gabon. He was Director of the Cabinet of the President of the National Assembly of Gabon during the 1990s and also served for a time as High Commissioner at the Ministry of Justice.

Later, Mapangou was Deputy Secretary-General in charge of Strategy at the Ministry of Defense, which was headed by Ali Bongo. Following the death of President Omar Bongo, opposition leader Pierre Mamboundou denounced an alleged coup plot on 23 June 2009. Mapangou responded to Mamboundou by denying the existence of coup plot and saying that Mamboundou had not given any information he might have on such a plot to the authorities. Mapangou nevertheless stressed that the army was "alert".

After Ali Bongo received the nomination of the Gabonese Democratic Party (PDG) as its candidate for the August 2009 presidential election, Mapangou worked on Bongo's campaign. Bongo won the election, according to official results, and it was anticipated that Mapangou would be one of his top associates as president. Taking office on 16 October 2009, he appointed François Engongah Owono as Secretary-General of the Presidency and Mapangou as Deputy Secretary-General of the Presidency on the same day; Mapangou was also assigned the role of Spokesman of the Presidency.

In the press, Mapangou's appointment at the Presidency was interpreted in light of two factors: Mapangou was already a close associate of Bongo because he had worked under Bongo at the Ministry of Defense, and Mapangou was native to the area of Fougamou in Ngounié Province—therefore his appointment could potentially draw local support away from opposition leader Louis-Gaston Mayila, who was also native to that area.
