= Blaise Louembe =

Gabonese political figure (born 1960)

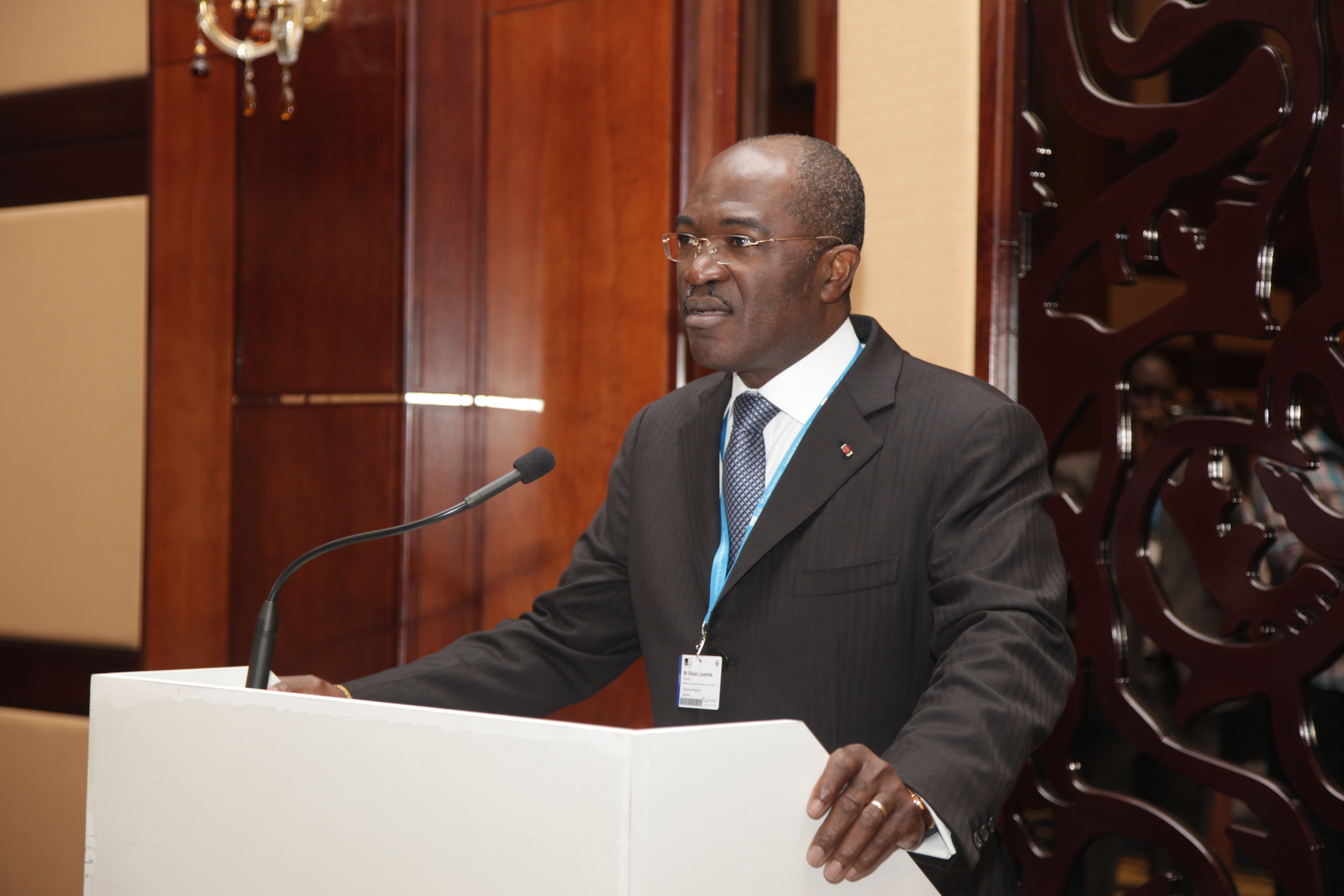
Blaise Louembe in 2018

Blaise Louembé (born 20 February 1960) is a Gabonese political figure. He served in the government of Gabon as Minister of the Economy, Finance, the Budget, and Privatization from 2008 to 2009 and was appointed as Minister of the Budget, Public Accounts, the Civil Service, and State Reform in October 2009. Since February 2014 he has served as Minister of Youth, Sports and Leisure.

Born in Koulamoutou, Blaise Louembe was Paymaster-General of Gabon from 22 March 2000 until he was appointed to the government as Minister of the Economy, Finance, the Budget, and Privatization on 7 October 2008. When Ali Bongo took office as President, he retained Louembe in the government but modified his portfolio, appointing him as Minister of the Budget, Public Accounts, and the Civil Service, in charge of State Reform, on 17 October 2009.

Blaise Louembe is also a businessman who own restaurants, estate, and a private channel called Kanal 7.

Following the 2023 Gabonese coup d'état, the Gabonese Democratic Party elected Louembe as its new leader in January 2025 to replace former president Ali Bongo. Under Louembe's leadership, the party endorsed Brice Oligui Nguema, who overthrew Bongo, in the 2025 Gabonese presidential election. This was opposed by some party executives and led to the creation of a splinter faction under Ali Akbar Onanga Y’Obégué, who was named by Bongo as the party's rightful leader.
