= Paul Boundoukou-Latha =

Gabonese politician (1952–2020)

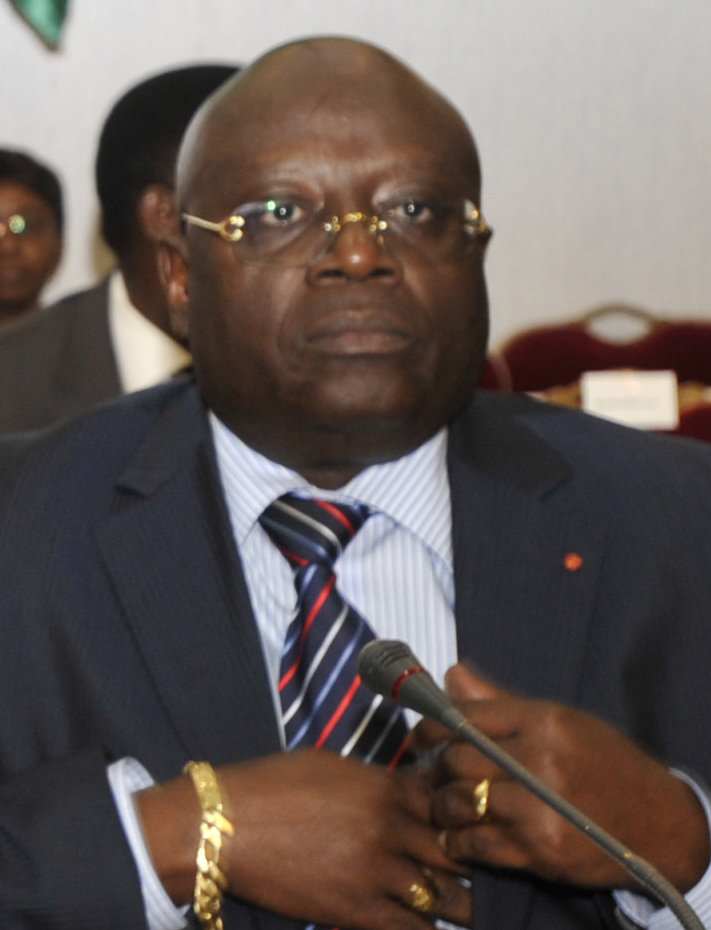
Paul Bunduku-Latha in 2010.

Paul Bunduku-Latha (1952 – 7 June 2020) was a Gabonese politician and diplomat. He was Gabon's Ambassador to Morocco from 1989 to 1993, Ambassador to the United States and Mexico from 1993 to 2001, and Ambassador to Germany from 2001 to 2006. He was Vice-Minister for the Environment from January 2009 to October 2009, Vice-Minister of Economy, Trade, Industry, and Tourism from October 2009 to January 2011, and he was appointed as Vice-Minister of Foreign Affairs in January 2011. In June 2013, he was appointed as Chairman of the Gabonese Housing Bank, then later appointed as the Chairman of the Gabonese Social Aid Fund.

== Diplomatic career ==
Following political studies in France at the University of Poitiers, Bunduku-Latha graduated in 1979. Back in Gabon, he was placed in charge of the Europe Studies Department at the Ministry of Foreign Affairs in 1983, and he was Director of International Organizations and Multilateral Cooperation from 1984 to 1986. Later, he was Gabon's Ambassador to Morocco from 1989 to 1993.

Bunduku-Latha was appointed as Gabonese Ambassador to the United States on 23 June 1993 and presented his credentials on 3 September 1993; he served concurrently as Ambassador to Mexico. Later, in December 2000, he was instead appointed as Ambassador to Germany; that was considered something of a demotion. He was recalled from Germany and replaced by Jean-Claude Bouyobart in May 2006.

== Political career ==
Bunduku-Latha joined the Gabonese Union for Democracy and Development (UGDD), an opposition party founded by his brother Zacharie Myboto in 2005, and held the post of UGDD Political Adviser. Later, Bunduku-Latha accepted an appointment to the government, along with UGDD Secretary-General Sylvestre Ratanga, on 14 January 2009; he was named Minister-Delegate under the Deputy Prime Minister for the Environment, Sustainable Development, and the Protection of Nature, Georgette Koko.

On 25 July 2009, following the death of President Omar Bongo in June 2009, Bunduku-Latha announced his support for the candidate of the Gabonese Democratic Party (PDG), Ali Bongo, in the 30 August 2009 presidential election. Bongo won the election, and after taking office as President he moved Bunduku-Latha to the position of Minister-Delegate under the Minister of the Economy, Trade, Industry, and Tourism on 17 October 2009. He was one of two ministers-delegate assigned to that ministry, sharing the responsibility with Françoise Assengone Obame. He also was elected President of the ACP council of ministers as Minister-Delegate under the Minister of the Economy, Trade, Industry and Tourism.

Bunduku-Latha joined the PDG on 6 March 2010.
