= La Concorde =

National anthem of Gabon

English: The Concorde
- National anthem of Gabon
- Lyrics: Georges Aleka Damas, 1960
- Music: Georges Aleka Damas, 1960
- Adopted: 1960

Audio sample
- U.S. Navy Band instrumental version (chorus and one verse): file; help

"La Concorde" (pronounced [la kɔ̃.kɔʁd]) is the national anthem of Gabon. Written and composed by politician Georges Aleka Damas, it was adopted upon independence in 1960.

== History ==
In a speech in Port-Gentil on 15 March 1962, President Léon M'ba stated his intention to have the national anthem translated into the various Gabonese dialects "so that in the remotest village in the country everyone will be able to understand its meaning."

== Lyrics ==
=== French lyrics ===
French lyrics

Refrain :
Uni dans la Concorde et la fraternité
Éveille-toi Gabon, une aurore se lève,
Encourage l'ardeur qui vibre et nous soulève!
𝄆 C'est enfin notre essor vers la félicité. 𝄇

I
Éblouissant et fier, le jour sublime monte
Pourchassant à jamais l'injustice et la honte.
Qu'il monte, monte encore et calme nos alarmes,
Qu'il prône la vertu et repousse les armes.

Refrain

II
Oui que le temps heureux rêvé par nos ancêtres
Arrive enfin chez nous, réjouisse (Note: Sometimes written rejouisse.) les êtres,
Et chasse les sorciers, ces perfides trompeurs
Qui sèment le poison et répandent la peur. (Note: Sometimes written Qui semaient le poison et répandaient la peur ("Who were sowing poison and spreading fear."), especially in older publications.)

Refrain

III
Afin qu'aux yeux du monde et des nations amies
Le Gabon immortel reste digne d'envie,
Oublions nos querelles, ensemble bâtissons
L'édifice nouveau auquel tous nous rêvons.

Refrain

IV
Des bords de l'Océan au cœur de la forêt,
Demeurons vigilants, sans faiblesse et sans haine!
Autour de ce drapeau, qui vers l'honneur nous mène,
Saluons la Patrie et chantons sans arrêt!

Refrain

IPA transcription (Note: See Help:IPA/French, French phonology and African French.)

[ʁə.fʁɛ̃]
[y.ni dɑ̃ la kɔ̃.kɔʁd e la fʁa.tɛʁ.ni.te]
[e.vɛj.twa ɡa.bɔ̃ yn o.ʁɔʁ sə lɛv]
[ɑ̃.ku.ʁaʒ l‿aʁ.dœʁ ki vibʁ e nu su.lɛv]
𝄆 [s‿ɛt‿ɑ̃.fɛ̃ nɔtʁ e.sɔʁ vɛʁ la fe.li.si.te] 𝄇

1
[e.blu.i.sɑ̃ e fjɛʁ lə ʒuʁ sy.blim mɔ̃t]
[puʁ.ʃa.sɑ̃ a ʒa.mɛ l‿ɛ̃.ʒys.tis e la ɔ̃t]
[k‿il mɔ̃t mɔ̃t ɑ̃.kɔʁ e kalm no a.laʁm]
[k‿il pʁon la vɛʁ.ty e ʁə.pus le.z‿ aʁm]

[ʁə.fʁɛ̃]

=== Translations ===
Sangu translation

Refrain:
Bootsu, budughe, ghu ghyèèndze, ne bumvile
Rambughe Ngabu, magyéélu me metsaange,
Sighe piindzu I ghwène tsukume, ne utélighe batu !
𝄆 Dine re Dimakulu dyéétu, ghu bufumu ne bumuumbe. 𝄇

I
Yalele ne Nyému, wisi wumeghi
Wupundzi di mubu, ighughume ne tsonyi
Wughi wukoondi ughi, wurumbimisi bekyère béétu,
Wusangimisi menyi, wukungighi bilwaani.

Refrain

English translation

Chorus:
United in the concord and the brotherhood,
Awaken thee, Gabon, dawn is at hand.
Stir up the spirit that thrills and inspires us!
𝄆 At last we rise up to attain happiness. 𝄇

I
Dazzling and proud, the sublime day dawns,
Dispelling for ever injustice and shame.
May it rise, rise again and calm our fears,
May it promote virtue and banish warfare.

Chorus

II
Yes, may the happy days dreamed by our ancestors
Come for us at last, rejoice our hearts,
And banish the sorcerers, those perfidious deceivers
Who sow poison and spread fear.

Chorus

III
So that, in the eyes of the world and of friendly nations,
The immortal Gabon may maintain her good repute,
Let us forget our quarrels, let us build together
The new structure of which we are all dreaming of.

Chorus

IV
From the shores of the Ocean to the heart of the forest,
Let us remain vigilant, without weakness and without hatred!
Around this flag which leads us to honour,
Let us salute the Fatherland and ever sing!

Chorus
