= List of presidents of the Senate of Gabon =

This is a list of presidents of the Senate of Gabon, who is the presiding officer of the Senate of Gabon. The Senate of Gabon was created in 1997.

The president of the Senate is the constitutional successor of the president of Gabon in case of a vacancy.

Name	Took office	Left office	Notes
Georges Rawiri	February 1997	9 April 2006	
Léonard Andjembé (Interim)	9 April 2006	2006	
René Radembino Coniquet	2006	2009	
Rose Francine Rogombé	17 February 2009	9 June 2009	
Léonard Andjembé (Interim)	10 June 2009	20 October 2009	
Rose Francine Rogombé	20 October 2009	27 February 2015	
Lucie Milebou Aubusson	27 February 2015	30 August 2023	
Paulette Missambo	18 September 2023	17 December 2025	
Huguette Nyana Ekoume	17 December 2025	Incumbent	
