= Angèle Rawiri =

Gabonese writer (1954–2010)

Angèle Christiane Rawiri
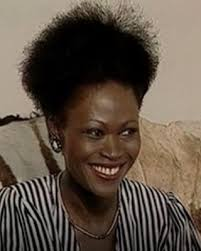
- Born: 1954; Port-Gentil, Gabon
- Died: 2010 (aged 55–56)
- Occupation: Writer
- Parent: Georges Rawiri (father)
- Writing career
- Language: French
- Notable works: Elonga; G'amèrakano au carrefour

Angèle Christiane Rawiri, or Angèle Ntyugwetondo Rawiri (1954–2010) was a Gabonese writer.

== Life and career ==
She was born in 1954 in Port-Gentil, and was the daughter of Georges Rawiri, a Gabonese politician, diplomat and poet who was a friend of President Omar Bongo. She was orphaned age 6. She studied at university in France. She then lived in London for two years, where she worked as a model and actress (notably in supporting roles in James Bond films). She returned to Gabon in the late 1970s and worked as a French-English translator for a Gabonese oil company, Société Nationale Pétrolière Gabonaise (still called Petrogab), while beginning to write. At the end of the 1980s, she returned to France and devoted herself to writing.

Her novel Elonga, published in 1980, denounces the scourge of witchcraft and occult sciences through the return home of a young mixed-race man. Her second novel, G'amèrakano au carrefour, was published in 1983. It deals with the confrontation between tradition and modernity in his native country through the story of a young secretary, Toula, who lives in an eccentric and sinister neighbourhood where she rubs shoulders with delinquents and idlers. She longs for a different life. A friend suggests that she lose weight, go out with a rich man and lighten her skin.

It was in France that she completed and published her best-known novel, The Fury and Cries of Women (1989), which evokes the frustrations of young people who have lived abroad in relation to certain obstacles in Gabonese society, the weight of families, infidelity and female homosexuality.

She belongs to a new post-independence generation of African novelists with a significant female presence.

She died in November 2010 due to an illness in Puteaux, near Paris.

The Fury and Cries of Women has been translated in Spanish in 2025 and published in 2026.

Angèle Rawiri is also the mother of a woman who still lives in the Paris region.

== Published works ==
- Elonga: roman Paris: Silex: L’Harmattan, diffusion, c1986. ISBN 2-903871-72-8
- Gʾamèrakano: au carrefour: roman Paris: Silex, c1988. ISBN 2-87693-021-8
- Fureurs et cris de femme Paris: L’Harmattan, c1989. ISBN 2-7384-0250-X
