= Vincent de Paul Gondjout =

Gabonese politician

Vincent de Paul Gondjout is a Gabonese politician. He is a member of the Gabonese Democratic Party (Parti démocratique gabonais, PDG), and is a Deputy of the National Assembly of Gabon representing the Commune of Libreville. He is the son of Paul Gondjout, who was a prominent figure in Gabon in the 1960s.
