= Léonard Andjembé =

Gabonese politician and professor

Léonard Andjembé (born 1 January 1948) is a Gabonese politician and professor. He is currently the First Vice-president of the Senate of Gabon, and he was the Senate's Interim President for several months in 2009.

== Political career ==
Andjembé was born in the Haut-Ogooué Province of southeastern Gabon and studied in France. He was Director of Research and Pedagogy at the Ministry of National Education from October 1976 to March 1978. As a professor, he has taught moral and political philosophy at the Omar Bongo University in Libreville and was Secretary-General of the university during the 1980s.

Andjembé, a member of the Gabonese Democratic Party (PDG), served in the National Assembly as a Deputy from Lékabi-Lewolo Department until the time of the December 1996 parliamentary election, when he faced Minister of Defense Idriss Ngari (also a PDG member) in a "fratricidal fight" for the seat. When the Senate was created in 1997, he was elected as a Senator from Ngouoni; he was re-elected to the Senate as a PDG candidate in 2003. As First Vice-president of the Senate, Andjembé temporarily directed the work of the Senate following the death of Senate President Georges Rawiri on 9 April 2006. President Omar Bongo rejected the possibility that Andjembé could be elected to succeed Rawiri in May 2006 on the grounds that Bongo and Andjembé originated from the same province and it was necessary to maintain an appropriate regional balance among the heads of state institutions.

Within the PDG, Andjembé was considered one of the leading figures of the party's moderate appeliste faction. As a representative of the Presidential Majority, Andjembé was included on the joint majority–opposition commission on the reform of the electoral process, which began its work in May 2006 and included 12 representatives from the Presidential Majority as well as 12 from the opposition. He was one of several deputy secretaries-general of the PDG until being replaced during the PDG's 9th Ordinary Congress in September 2008.

In December 2008, Andjembé was again designated as the PDG's candidate for the constituency of Ngouoni and Lékabi-Lewolo Department in the 18 January 2009 Senate election. He won re-election to his seat and was then re-elected as First Vice-president of the Senate on 16 February 2009. Following the death of President Bongo on 8 June 2009, Senate President Rose Francine Rogombé constitutionally succeeded Bongo as president, and Andjembé accordingly became Interim President of the Senate.

Andjembé was considered to be one of the PDG leaders favorably disposed to Ali Bongo's effort to secure the party's nomination for the August 2009 presidential election. Bongo received the nomination and then prevailed in the presidential election, according to official results. He was sworn in as president on 16 October 2009, and Rogombé returned to her post as President of the Senate on 20 October, taking over from Andjembé. There was no provision in the constitution specifically enabling her to return to her former post, but it was believed that Rogombé's resumption of duties in the Senate could constitute a precedent in that regard.

On 4 February 2012, Chinese Ambassador Li Fushun held a farewell meeting with Andjembé, the representative of the Senate, prior to the end of her stint as ambassador.

Following the December 2014 Senate election, Andjembé was re-elected as First Vice-president of the Senate on 27 February 2015.
