= Guy Nzouba-Ndama =

Gabonese politician

President of the National Assembly of Gabon
- In office 27 January 1997 – 31 March 2016
- Preceded by: Marcel Éloi Rahandi Chambrier
- Succeeded by: Richard Onouviet

Personal details
- Born: 17 July 1946 (age 80)
- Party: The Democrats; Gabonese Democratic Party

Guy Nzouba-Ndama (born 17 July 1946) is a Gabonese politician who was President of the National Assembly of Gabon from 1997 to 2016. He previously served in the government of Gabon as Minister of National Education from 1987 to 1990 and was President of the Parliamentary Group of the Gabonese Democratic Party (Parti démocratique gabonais, PDG) from 1990 to 1996.

== Background and early career ==
Nzouba-Ndama was born at Koulamoutou, located in Lolo-Bouenguidi Department; he is an ethnic Nzebi. After studying in France, he began teaching philosophy in September 1975, and he was appointed as Director of Orientation at the Directorate-General of Scholarships and Internships in November 1975, while continuing to teach. In 1980, he became Director-General of Scholarships and Internships, remaining in that post until 1983.

== Political career ==
Nzouba-Ndama was first appointed to the government as Minister-Delegate under the Minister of State for Trade and Industry in March 1983. He was then appointed as Minister-Delegate under the Fourth Deputy Prime Minister for the Land-Survey Register, Housing and Lodgings in January 1986 before being promoted to the position of Minister of National Education on 18 November 1987. In the midst of a strike involving teachers, President Omar Bongo dismissed him from his post as Minister of National Education on 26 February 1990; subsequently he was Political Adviser to President Bongo from February to November 1990. In the 1990 parliamentary election, he was elected to the National Assembly as a candidate in Koulamoutou, and he was the President of the PDG Parliamentary Group from 1990 to 1996. He was re-elected to the National Assembly in the December 1996 parliamentary election. Following the latter election, Nzouba-Ndama was elected as President of the National Assembly on 27 January 1997.

Nzouba-Ndama retained his parliamentary seat in the December 2001 parliamentary election and was re-elected as President of the National Assembly on 25 January 2002; he received 111 votes, with one deputy voting against him and seven abstaining. As President of the National Assembly, he visited Cameroon in February 2006.

He was again re-elected as a Deputy in the December 2006 parliamentary election, and he was re-elected for a third term as President of the National Assembly on 24 January 2007, receiving 111 votes from the 120 deputies. Speaking on the occasion, Nzouba-Ndama praised the deputies of the preceding legislature for producing legislation that he said benefited the people, and he thanked President Bongo for retaining confidence in his leadership of the National Assembly. He also discussed his hope that roads across the country would be paved, saying that the National Assembly could use its legislative power to direct the government towards that goal.

Nzouba-Ndama was a member of the Executive Committee of the Inter-Parliamentary Union from 1999 to 2003. Subsequently, he was President of the Parliamentary Assembly of La Francophonie.

=== Events since 2007 ===
22-9-22 arrested with 1.9 million euro's in local currency.. tried to get it into his country. As of the 2000s, Nzouba-Ndama was a Vice-President of the PDG. He was President of the Preparatory Committee for the PDG's Ninth Congress, which was held on 19–21 September 2007; he was also chosen by President Bongo to lead the work of the congress. Nzouba-Ndama met with Wu Bangguo, the Chairman of the Standing Committee of the National People's Congress of the People's Republic of China, on 7 November 2008 to discuss cooperation.

Following Omar Bongo's death in June 2009, Nzouba-Ndama was considered a supporter of Bongo's son Ali in the latter's efforts to obtain the PDG nomination for the August 2009 presidential election. Ali Bongo won the nomination and then prevailed in the presidential election, according to official results. When Bongo was sworn in as President on 16 October 2009, Nzouba-Ndama said that he faced a "Herculean" task: he would face pressure to carry out reforms, but would also be expected to do so in a moderate fashion while preserving the political balance crafted by his father.

Nzouba-Ndama represented Gabon at the fourth ministerial meeting of the Forum on China–Africa Cooperation, which opened on 8 November 2009, and on that occasion he met with Wen Jiabao, the Premier of the People's Republic of China, to discuss the continuation of the friendly and cooperative relationship between the two countries.

In the December 2011 parliamentary election, Nzouba-Ndama easily won re-election to the National Assembly; he won the first seat for Lolo-Wagna, located in Lolo Bouenguidi Department, receiving 98.08% of the vote according to preliminary results. Amidst an opposition boycott, the PDG won an overwhelming majority of seats in the election. Nzouba-Ndama represented Gabon at the 15th summit of the Economic Community of Central African States, which opened on 15 January 2012 at N'Djamena in Chad. He was the only national representative present at the summit who was not a president, vice-president, or government minister.

Nzouba-Ndama was re-elected as President of the National Assembly on 27 February 2012. While most of the top officials who served under Omar Bongo lost their posts in the period that followed his death, Nzouba-Ndama was noted for his political survival, which was attributed to his loyalty to Ali Bongo. He was present for the inauguration of Senegalese President Macky Sall on 2 April 2012.

Despite his earlier loyalty to Ali Bongo, by 2015 tensions seemed to have developed between them, and Nzouba-Ndama was seen as being close to a dissenting faction within the PDG, known as "Heritage and Modernity". On 31 March 2016, Nzouba-Ndama resigned as President of the National Assembly. He said that he chose to resign because of the government's hostility towards him. Shortly thereafter, on 5 April 2016, he announced that he would stand as an independent candidate in the August 2016 presidential election.
