= Paul Toungui =

Gabonese politician

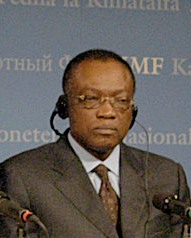
Toungui at the 2004 IMF Spring Meetings

Paul Toungui (born 7 September 1950) is a Gabonese politician who served in the government of Gabon from 1990 to 2012. He was Minister of Finance from 1991 to 1994, Minister of Mines, Energy, and Oil from 1994 to 2002, Minister of State for the Economy and Finance from 2002 to 2008, and finally Minister of State for Foreign Affairs from 2008 to 2012.

== Political career ==
Toungui was born in Okonja, located in Haut-Ogooué Province in southeastern Gabon, and studied mathematics, earning a degree in France. He was Director-General of the Institute of the Economy and Finance from 1983 to 1990. Standing as a candidate of the Gabonese Democratic Party (PDG) in the 1990 parliamentary election, he was elected to the National Assembly of Gabon. In 1991, he joined the government as Minister of Finance and the Budget, holding that post until March 1994.

From March 1994 to January 2002, Toungui was Minister of Mines, Energy and Oil; he was assigned additional responsibility for hydraulic resources in January 1999, and in January 2001 he was promoted to the rank of Minister of State. He was re-elected to the National Assembly as a PDG candidate in the 1996 parliamentary election and the 2001 parliamentary election. Following the latter election, Toungui was made Minister of State for the Economy, Finance, the Budget, and Privatization on 27 January 2002.

In the December 2006 parliamentary election, he was elected to the National Assembly as the PDG candidate in Okonja constituency. After nearly seven years as Finance Minister, Toungui was instead appointed as Minister of State for Foreign Affairs, Cooperation, La Francophonie, and Regional Integration on 7 October 2008. He succeeded Laure Olga Gondjout as Foreign Minister on 9 October.

After President Omar Bongo died in June 2009 and his son Ali Bongo was elected to succeed him, Toungui was retained as Foreign Minister in Ali Bongo's first government, appointed on 17 October 2009. He kept his position despite a wave of dismissals of other long-serving ministers and key officials. Having survived Ali Bongo's initial reworking of the government, he was its longest-serving minister, with nearly two decades of continuous experience. He was dismissed from the government on 28 February 2012.

== Personal life ==
Toungui is the son-in-law of Omar Bongo, who was President of Gabon from 1967 to 2009; he married Bongo's daughter, Pascaline Bongo, in 1995.

Preceded by Laure Olga Gondjout	Foreign Minister of Gabon; 2008–2012	Succeeded by Emmanuel Issoze-Ngondet
