= Gabonese Union for Democracy and Development =

Political party in Gabon

The Gabonese Union for Democracy and Development (French: Union gabonaise pour la démocratie et le développement, UGDD) was a political party in Gabon.

== History ==
The party was formed in 2005 by Zacharie Myboto, a former member of the ruling Gabonese Democratic Party (PDG). Myboto ran as an independent in the November 2005 presidential elections as the UGDD was not legalized prior to the election) in the presidential election held on 27 November 2005. He finished third out of five candidates with 6.58% of the vote. The UGDD was legally recognized by the Ministry of the Interior on 27 April 2006.

In the 2006 parliamentary elections the party won 4 of the 120 seats in the National Assembly. It subsequently joined the Parliamentary Group of the Forces of Change. In the April 2008 local elections the UGDD won 161 seats across the country.

Two members of the UGDD—Sylvestre Ratanga, the party's Secretary-General, and Paul Boundoukou Lata—were appointed ministers on 14 January 2009. Myboto said that, by accepting positions in the government, they had excluded themselves from the UGDD.

In 2010, the party merged with the African Development Movement and the National Republican Rally to form the National Union.
