= Constitutional Court of Gabon =

The Constitutional Court of Gabon (French: Cour Constitutionnelle de la république gabonaise or Cour constitutionnelle du Gabon) is a specialised court in Gabon with jurisdiction over constitutional issues. A constitutional court of this nature is more common among countries using the civil law. It has nine members and was established by the National Assembly in July 1991.

The current president of the court is Dieudonné Aba'A Oyono. Marie-Madeleine Mborantsuo, the court's first president, was considered close to former presidents of Gabon, Omar Bongo and Ali Bongo. She served in the role for 32 years, from the creation of the court until 2023.
