= 2008 Gabonese local elections =

Local elections were held in Gabon on 27–30 April 2008, with 1,990 municipal and departmental councillors being elected.

== Overview ==
Prior to the election, a victory for the ruling Gabonese Democratic Party (PDG) was expected. There were a total of about 850 lists presented in the elections, and campaigning ended at midnight on 26 April. Results given by the Interior Minister, André Mba Obame, on 3 May showed the PDG winning 1,154 seats, while the opposition Gabonese Union for Democracy and Development (UGDD) won 161 seats. The Union of the Gabonese People (UPG) won about 90 seats, while many seats were won by independents.

According to Mba Obame, the PDG majority confirmed the voters' "commitment to the implementation of the political project" of President Omar Bongo. The results still had to be validated and proclaimed by the Constitutional Court. The councillors were to elect mayors within eight days of the formal proclamation of results.

Obame placed voter turnout at between 65% and 70%. Although reported high in most of the country, it was said to be low in Libreville, the capital, where it was estimated at 17%.

There were 119 constituencies in the election, and the PDG was the only party to present candidate lists in all of them. In Libreville, the PDG won a plurality of seats but failed to win a majority, taking 42 of the 98 seats and winning in three of the six arrondissements. The PDG's best result in Libreville was obtained in the fifth arrondissement, where its list was headed by former Prime Minister Jean-Francois Ntoutoume Emane and it obtained 12 out of 16 seats. In the country's second city, Port-Gentil, the PDG won only 15 out the 63 seats, while the independent list of Mayor Séraphin Ndaot Rembogo won 28.

Following Obame's announcement of results, the Rally for Gabon (RPG), which is part of the presidential majority, held a protest against the results, alleging that various means were used to skew the vote in favor of the PDG. It demanded that the vote in Libreville be cancelled and that the electoral system be reformed.

The President of the Constitutional Court, Marie Madeleine Mborantsuo, announced final results on 7 May, confirming the PDG's victory, with its numbers largely unchanged from those given by Mba Obame a few days earlier. Emile Moussavou Moundziegou, a PDG deputy who was accused of destroying a ballot box, was penalized by being barred from office for five years. Additionally, the Court ordered an investigation of violence that occurred in Lemboumbi-Leyou Department in the south-east and in the commune of Mitzic in the north, noting that any elected candidates who were involved in this violence would also lose their mandates.

On 8 May the government set the election for mayors of municipalities and for the presidents and vice-presidents of departmental councils for 20 May; the election for mayors of arrondissements was to be held on 25 May.

The election for mayors of municipalities and for the presidents of departmental councils was held on 23 May, and Ntoutoume Emane was elected unopposed as Mayor of Libreville. He received 84 votes; the remaining 14 votes were invalid. Four deputy mayors were also elected: Michel Teale of the PDG, Christian Odou Mba of the Rally of the Gabonese People (RPG), Eloi Ndzondo of the Circle of Liberal Reformers (CLR), and Léandre Zué of the PDG.
