= Georges Rawiri =

Gabonese politician, diplomat and poet (1932–2006)

President of the Senate of Gabon
- In office February 1997 – 9 April 2006
- President: Omar Bongo
- Succeeded by: Léonard Andjembé (interim)

Personal details
- Born: 10 March 1932 Lambaréné, Gabon
- Died: 9 April 2006 (aged 74) Paris, France
- Party: Gabonese Democratic Party

Georges Rawiri (10 March 1932 – 9 April 2006) was a Gabonese politician, diplomat and poet.

== Early years and entrance to government ==
Rawiri was born in Lambaréné, in western Gabon. He was the nephew of Paul Gondjout, the first President of the National Assembly of Gabon.

Rawiri moved to France in 1946, where he finished school and studied radio techniques. In 1957, he returned to Africa, helping to establish a radio station in Garoua, in northern Cameroon. He served as the head of the Gabonese national broadcasting network from 1960 to 1963.

Rawiri became involved in government in 1963, when he was elected to the City Council in Lambaréné. In 1964, he entered national government, applying his broadcasting experience as the Gabonese Minister of Information, Tourism, Post, and Telecommunications. By 1965, he was also serving as Gabon's ambassador to France, Israel, Italy, Malta, Spain, and the United Kingdom. In this period, he was working under the government of President Léon M'ba, who died in office and was succeeded by Omar Bongo, the vice-president.

== Governmental service under Omar Bongo ==
Rawiri was close to Bongo and remained in government after Bongo took office in 1967. Rawiri served as Minister of Foreign Affairs from 1971 to 1974. Some time later, he served as Minister of State for Economic and Financial Coordination. From 1975 to 1989, he was the Minister of Transportation, and oversaw the construction of the Trans-Gabon Railway. He also served as a Deputy Prime Minister throughout the 1980s. He retained close ties to Lambaréné and served as a liaison between Bongo's government and the locals on at least one occasion.

In the early 1990s, Rawiri left his ministerial roles and became the personal representative of Bongo. In 1997, when the Senate was established, he became its President. He was unanimously re-elected as President of the Senate on 26 February 2003, remaining in that post until his death.

In 2002, the weekly periodical Gabaon was suspended for three months by the Gabonese government after running what the government considered a "violent" critique of Rawiri. Rawiri was rumored to be the second-wealthiest man in Gabon, behind only the president himself.

Rawiri promoted Gabonese poets and novelists during his time in charge of the Ministry of Culture in the 1970s. His daughter, Angèle Rawiri, was a novelist and translator, referred to as the "first female novelist of Gabon".

== Death ==
Rawiri died in April 2006 at a hospital in Paris, France. At the time of his death, he was Co-President of the Africa Caribbean Pacific – European Union (ACP–EU) Joint Parliamentary Assembly. Bongo declared seven days of mourning for Rawiri, calling Rawiri "more than a brother, a parent" to him, describing him as an unprecedented individual in the country's history.

After Rawiri's death, the Georges Rawiri House, intended to serve as the headquarters of the RTG1 television channel, was built with Chinese assistance and inaugurated in 2007, the year after Rawiri's death. A hospital in his hometown of Lambaréné has also been named after him.

Preceded by Jean Rémy Ayouné	Foreign Minister of Gabon; 1971–1974	Succeeded by Paul Okoumba d'Okwatsegue
