= Marcellin Mve Ebang =

Gabonese politician

Marcellin Mve Ebang (born 13 April 1959) is a Gabonese politician. He is a member of the Gabonese Democratic Party (Parti démocratique gabonais) (PDG), a diplomat and a deputy of the National Assembly of Gabon in Libreville. He studied at Paris 1 Pantheon-Sorbonne University in International Law.
