= Order of the Equatorial Star =

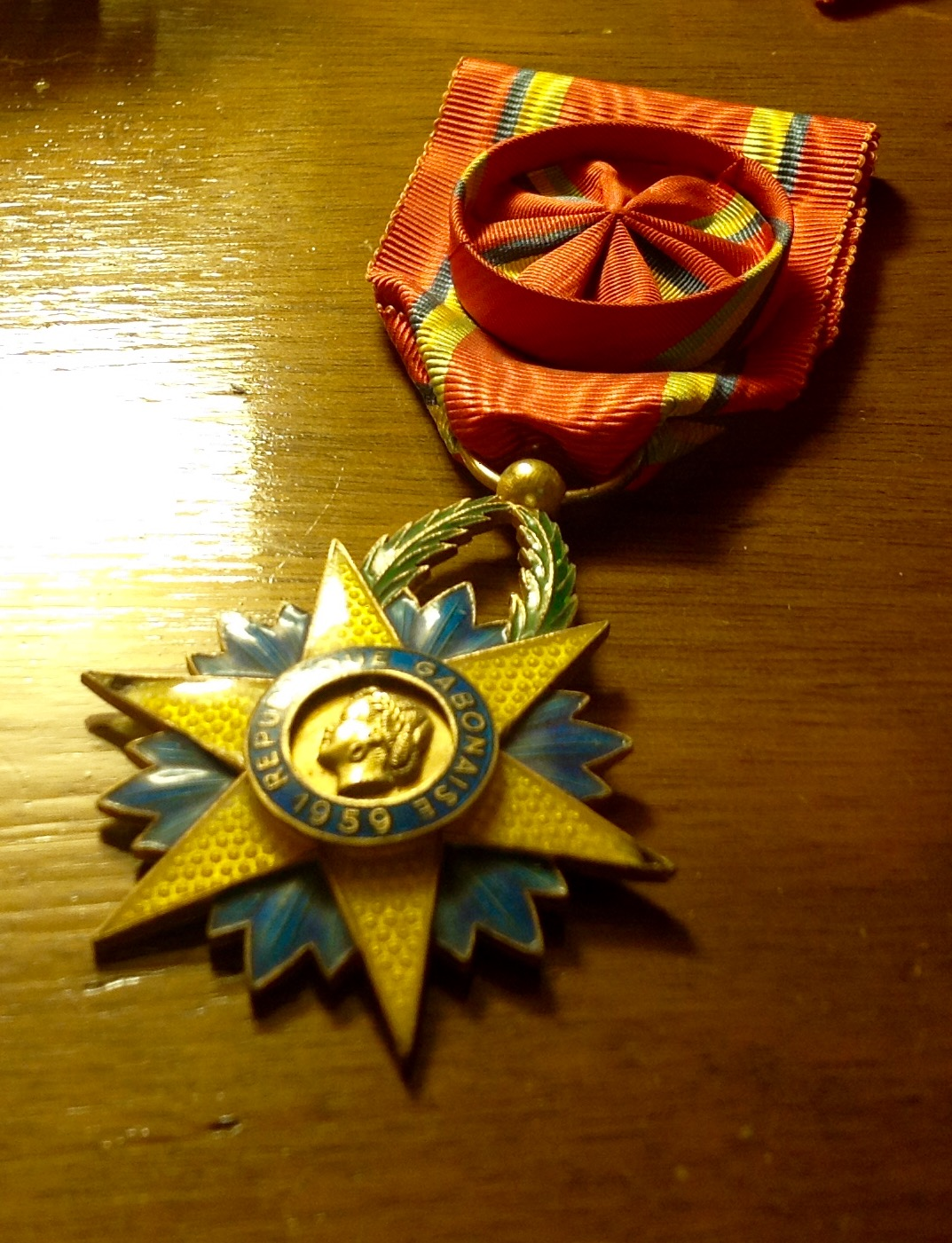
- Order awarded to David Ben Gurion
- Type: Five-grade order
- Awarded for: personal merit and service to the nation, both civil and military.
- Presented by: Gabon
- Status: active
- Established: August 6, 1959
- Ribbon of the Order

Precedence
- Next (higher): none
- Next (lower): National Order of Merit

The Order of the Equatorial Star (French: Ordre de l'Etoile Equatoriale) is a state order of Gabon.

Instituted on 6 August 1959, it is awarded for personal merit and service to the nation, both civil and military. It has five grades: Grand Cross, Grand Officer, Commander, Officer and Knight.

== Notable recipients ==
- Virginie Ambougou – Gabonese royal and politician (1902–1992)
- Jean-Bédel Bokassa – Leader of Central Africa from 1966 to 1979
- Paul Boundoukou-Latha – Gabonese politician (1952–2020)
- Andrés Carrascosa Coso – Spanish prelate of the Catholic Church (born 1955) (Grand Officer) (2009)
- Yvette Chassagne – French politician (1922–2007)
- Maurice Couve de Murville – Prime Minister of France from 1968 to 1969
- Michel Debré – Prime Minister of France from 1959 to 1962
- Lamine Diack – Senegalese businessman (1933–2021)
- Abba Hushi – Polish-born Israeli politician (1898–1969)
- Mordechai Ish-Shalom – Israeli politician and labor leader (1902–1991)
- Luiz Inácio Lula da Silva – President of Brazil (2003–2011; since 2023)
- Kadish Luz – Israeli politician (1895–1972)
- Ferdinand Marcos – President of the Philippines from 1965 to 1986
- Golda Meir – Prime Minister of Israel from 1969 to 1974
- Rose Christiane Raponda – Vice President of Gabon in 2023
- Albert Schweitzer – German polymath (1875–1965)
- Zalman Shazar – President of Israel from 1963 to 1973
- Franz Josef Strauss – German politician (1915–1988)
- Seif el-Din el-Zoubi – Israeli politician (1913–1986)
- Mohammad Reza Pahlavi – Shah of Iran from 1941 to 1979
