= List of presidents of the National Assembly of Gabon =

This is a list of presidents of the National Assembly of Gabon, who is the presiding officer of National Assembly of Gabon.

Name	Took office	Left office	Notes
Paul Indjendjet Gondjout	March 1957	February 1961	
Louis Bigmann	12 February 1961	12 April 1964	
Georges Aleka Damas	April 1964	April 1975	
Paul Indjendjet Gondjout	April 1975	February 1980	
Augustin Boumah	February 1980	November 1990	
Jules-Aristide Bourdes-Ogouliguende	November 1990	April 1993	
Marcel Éloi Rahandi Chambrier	April 1993	May 1996	
Guy Nzouba-Ndama	27 January 1997	31 March 2016	
Richard Auguste Onouviet	8 April 2016	30 April 2018	
In abeyance	30 April 2018	11 January 2019	
Faustin Boukoubi	11 January 2019	30 August 2023	
Transition; Jean-François Ndongou	15 September 2023	17 November 2025	
