= Senate of Gabon =

Upper house of the Parliament of Gabon

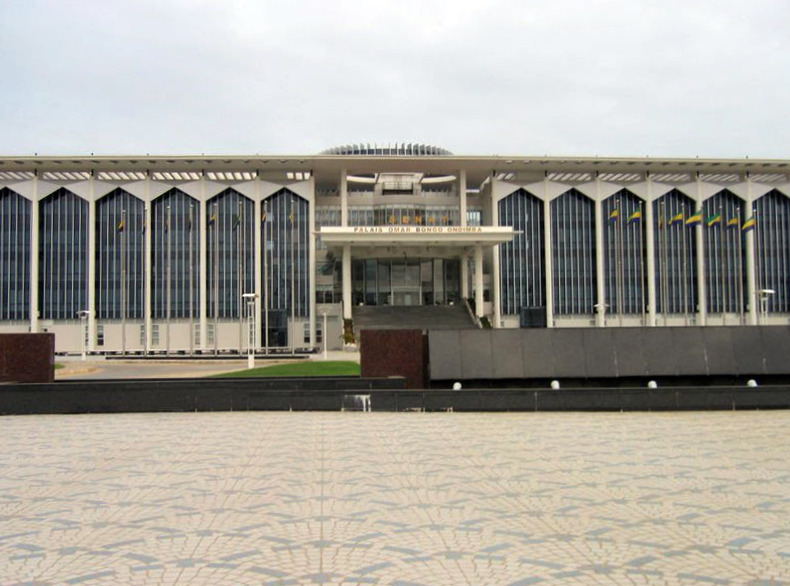
Omar Bongo Ondimba Palace

The Senate (French: Sénat) is the upper house of the Parliament of Gabon. It has 67 members, elected in single-seat constituencies by local and départemental councillors (52 seats) or appointed by the president (15 seats) for a six-year term. Beginning with the 2009 election, some constituencies elect two senators. The Senate currently stands dissolved following the 2023 coup d'état. Elections for the National Assembly have been held, but no timetable for the election of the Senate has been set by the Oligui administration.

== History ==
The 1991 Constitution provided for the establishment of the Senate; previously the legislature had consisted of a unicameral National Assembly. The creation of Senate was approved on 18 March 1994. The Senate was not created until 1997, when an election was held to fill the seats in the upper house.

The first Senate president was Georges Rawiri (1932-2006), a long-time national political figure and close ally of Omar Bongo. He served in this position until his death in 2006.

He was replaced by René Radembino Coniquet, also a member of the Myéné ethnic group.

A Senate election was held on 18 January 2009. The ruling Gabonese Democratic Party won a large majority of seats. On this occasion, the number of senators was increased from 91 to 102. Following the election, Rose Francine Rogombé was elected as President of the Senate.

== Elections ==
| Party | Seats | | | |
| Party | 1997 | 2003 | 2009 | 2014 |
|---|---|---|---|---|
| Gabonese Democratic Party | 52 | 67 | 75 | 81 |
| National Woodcutters' Rally – Rally for Gabon | 19 | 8 | 6 | 0 |
| Gabonese Progress Party | 4 | 1 | 0 | 0 |
| Democratic and Republican Alliance | 3 | 3 | 1 | 1 |
| Social Democratic Party | 0 | 1 | 2 | 2 |
| People's Unity Party | 1 | 0 | – | – |
| Union of the Gabonese People | 1 | 1 | 2 | 1 |
| Gabon of the Future | – | 1 | 0 | 0 |
| Common Movement for Development | 1 | – | – | – |
| Circle of Liberal Reformers | 1 | 4 | 2 | 7 |
| Rally for Democracy and Progress | 1 | 1 | – | – |
| Independent Centre Party of Gabon | 0 | 1 | 2 | 1 |
| Gabonese Union for Democracy and Development | – | – | 3 | – |
| Independents | 8 | 3 | 9 | 7 |
| Total | 91 | 91 | 102 | 100 |
Source: DSG (1997, 2002), IPU (2009), IPU (2014)

== See also ==
- List of presidents of the Senate of Gabon
