= Manuel Corte-Real =

Portuguese diplomat and historian

His Excellency Manuel Corte-Real GCC OIH GCM
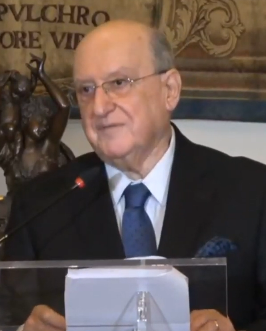

Chief of Protocol of Portugal
- In office 20 November 2005 – 26 October 2008
- Preceded by: Eurico Paes
- Succeeded by: José de Bouza Serrano
- In office 27 October 2000 – September 2002
- Preceded by: Rui Goulart de Ávila
- Succeeded by: Eurico Paes

Portuguese Ambassador to Switzerland
- In office 20 November 2002 – 28 October 2005
- President: Jorge Sampaio
- Preceded by: Rui Goulart de Ávila
- Succeeded by: Eurico Paes

Portuguese Ambassador to Ukraine
- In office 2 December 1993 – 16 November 1998
- President: Mário Soares; Jorge Sampaio
- Preceded by: Diplomatic relations established
- Succeeded by: António Faria e Maya

Personal details
- Born: Manuel Henrique de Melo e Castro de Mendonça Corte-Real; 29 October 1940 (age 85) Lapa, Lisbon, Portugal
- Spouse: Maria da Conceição Corte-Real
- Education: University of Lisbon

Manuel Henrique de Melo e Castro de Mendonça Corte-Real GCC OIH GCM (born 29 October 1940) is a Portuguese diplomat and historian.

== Biography ==
Manuel Corte-Real was born on 29 October 1940, in Lapa, Lisbon. He earned a licentiate degree in History from the Faculty of Letters of the University of Lisbon, where he taught as a lecturer (assistente) from 1966 to 1970.

He began his diplomatic career in September 1969, when he became an attaché; he became a Third Secretary in 1972 and was posted to the Portuguese embassy in Bonn in October 1973. He was promoted to Second Secretary in 1974 and to First Secretary in 1976; in February 1977, he was posted to the Portuguese embassy in Brasília.

In January 1980, he was appointed chief of staff to the Minister of Foreign Affairs, Diogo Freitas do Amaral and, in February 1981, as head of the Office for International Political Bodies (Repartição dos Organismos Políticos Internacionais). In October 1982, he was promoted to the rank of Counsellor, and in 1984 was posted to the Portuguese embassy in London; between January and June 1989, he acted as interim head of mission in London as chargé d'affaires. In 1990, he was appointed Consul-General in Seville.

In April 1993, he was promoted to the rank of Minister Plenipotentiary, and in December of that year, Corte-Real became the first Portuguese Ambassador in Kyiv, after Portugal had recognised the independence of Ukraine in 1992. When Diogo Freitas do Amaral was President of the United Nations General Assembly in 1995–1996, Corte-Real joined him, on secondment, again as his chief of staff.

In 1998, after being promoted to the rank of Minister Plenipotentiary, First Class, in March, he served as Chief of Protocol of the 1998 Lisbon World Exposition.

In November 1998, he was appointed President of the Portuguese Diplomatic Institute (Instituto Diplomático). He served as the country's Chief of Protocol from October 2000 to September 2002, during which tenure he was promoted to the diplomatic rank of Ambassador. In November 2002, he presented his credentials as the Portuguese Ambassador to Switzerland; he returned to Portugal in 2005 and once again served as Chief of Protocol, until 2008. As Chief of Protocol, he was responsible for the important international meetings of the Portuguese Presidency of the Council of the European Union in 2007 as well as for the ceremonies of the Signing of the Treaty of Lisbon, the 20th EU-Russia Summit in Mafra, and the 2nd EU-Africa Summit in Lisbon.

More recently, Corte-Real has led the "Missão para o Património" working group of the Ministry of Foreign Affairs, with the goal of studying and publishing the cultural heritage of the Necessidades Palace.

In 2024, Manuel Corte-Real was appointed by the Council of Ministers to the committee of curators for the official commemorations of the quincentennial of the birth of Luís de Camões, on behalf of the Minister of State and of Foreign Affairs, Paulo Rangel.

== Published works ==
- A feitoria Portuguesa na Andaluzia 1500–1532 (Instituto de Alta Cultura, Ed. Fundação Calouste Gulbenkian, Lisbon, 1967)
- Feitores e escrivães da feitoria Portuguesa na Andaluzia ("Separata da Revista do Tempo e da História", III, Centro de Estudos Históricos da Faculdade de Letras de Lisboa, 1968)
- O Palácio das Necessidades (Ed. Ministério dos Negócios Estrangeiros, Lisbon, 1981) — recipient of the Júlio de Castilho Prize in 1983
  - 2nd Edition, Ed. Chaves Ferreira S.A., 2001; 3rd Edition, By the Book, 2020
- O Palácio de S. Clemente (Ed. Andrea Jakobsen Estúdio, Rio de Janeiro, 2005)
- Embaixadas de Portugal (Ed. Polígono, Lda., 2006)
- "O Palácio da Cova da Moura", in O Palácio da Cova da Moura: a Casa dos Assuntos Europeus (By the Book, 2020)

== Distinctions ==
=== National orders ===
- Grand Cross of the Military Order of Christ (4 August 1998)
- Officer of the Military Order of Christ (21 June 1972)
- Officer of the Order of Prince Henry (29 March 1972)
- Grand Cross of the Order of Merit (21 January 1993)

=== Foreign orders ===
- Commander of the Royal Order of Saint Olav, Norway (12 November 1980)
- Commander of the Order of Merit of the Republic, Italy (12 November 1980)
- Commander of the Order of Merit of the Federal Republic, Germany (10 February 1981)
- Commander of the Order of Saint Gregory the Great, Holy See (21 January 1983)
- Commander of the Order of the Southern Cross, Brazil (21 October 1983)
- Grand Cross of the Order of Bernardo O'Higgins, Chile (30 September 2001)
- Grand Cross of the Order of Merit of the Republic, Italy (1 April 2002)
- Grand Cordon of the Order of the Liberator, Venezuela (24 June 2002)
- Grand Cross, First Class of the Decoration of Honour for Services to the Republic, Austria (14 August 2002)
- 3rd Class of the Order of the Cross of Terra Mariana, Estonia (29 March 2006)
- Grand Cross of the Order of Isabella the Catholic, Spain (19 September 2007)
- Grand Cross of the Order for Merits, Lithuania (8 January 2008)
- Grand Cross of the Royal Order of the Polar Star (16 May 2008)
- Grand Cross of the Order of Merit of the Republic, Poland (3 March 2009)
- Grand Cross of the Royal Norwegian Order of Merit, Norway (25 September 2009)
- Knight Grand Cross of Honour and Devotion, Sovereign Military Order of Malta
- Cross of the Order pro Merito Melitensi, Sovereign Military Order of Malta
- Cross of Merit, First Class of the Order of Merit of the Federal Republic, Germany (1 March 2011)
- Grand Cross of the Order of the Liberator General San Martín, Argentina
- Grand Cross of the National Order of Merit, Gabon
- Commander of the Order of British Empire, United Kingdom
- Officer of the Order of Rio Branco, Brazil
