= Eurico Paes =

Portuguese diplomat

His Excellency Eurico Paes OIH GOM
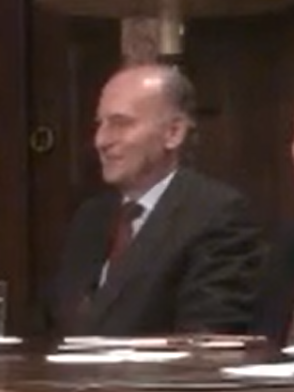

Chief of Protocol of Portugal
- In office 9 September 2002 – 20 November 2005
- Preceded by: Manuel Corte-Real
- Succeeded by: Manuel Corte-Real

Portuguese Ambassador to Switzerland
- In office 28 October 2005 – 7 April 2010
- President: Jorge Sampaio; Aníbal Cavaco Silva
- Preceded by: Manuel Corte-Real
- Succeeded by: José Lameiras

Portuguese Ambassador to Zimbabwe
- In office 5 July 2000 – 9 September 2002
- President: Jorge Sampaio
- Preceded by: Carlos Neves Ferreira
- Succeeded by: João Versteeg

Personal details
- Born: Eurico Jorge Henriques Paes; 3 June 1946 (age 80) Lisbon, Portugal
- Education: University of Lisbon

Eurico Jorge Henriques Paes OIH GOM (born 3 June 1946) is a Portuguese diplomat.

He earned a licentiate degree in Law from the University of Lisbon in 1971, and joined the diplomatic career in 1974.

Among other relevant positions, he chaired the group of United Nations observers for the first democratic elections in Guinea-Bissau in 1994, and coordinated the protocolary preparations and served as the master of ceremonies during the Handover of Macau in 1999,

He served as the Portuguese Ambassador in Harare (Zimbabwe) from 2000 to 2002, as the country's Chief of Protocol from 2002 to 2005, and as the Portuguese Ambassador in Bern (Switzerland) from 2005 to 2010.

== Distinctions ==
=== National orders ===
- Officer of the Order of Prince Henry (26 April 1978)
- Grand Officer of the Order of Merit (11 October 1996)
