= Sari diplomacy =

Sari diplomacy is the use of the sari by non-Asian women as a diplomatic uniform.

Cherie Blair was the first British First Lady to dress up in sarees and salwar suits on formal occasions.

Samantha Cameron, was also noted for her appearance at a Diwali event in London in silk saree which was described by Hello Magazine as "splendid".

In 2014, Pakistan's Prime Minister Nawaz Sharif gifted a sari to India's PM Narendra Modi's mother, as a gesture of diplomatic goodwill between India and Pakistan. In June 2014, Sushma Swaraj, India's External Affairs Minister, gifted a South silk sari to Bangladesh's Prime Minister Sheikh Hasina, who reciprocated with a Jamdani sari.
