= Ihor Brusylo =

Ukrainian politician (born 1980)

- Ігор Михайлович Брусило
- President: Volodymyr Zelenskyy

Ambassador of Ukraine to Italy
- Incumbent
- Assumed office 3 March 2026
- Preceded by: Yaroslav Melnyk

Ambassador of Ukraine to Malta
- Incumbent
- Assumed office 26 June 2026

Ambassador of Ukraine to San Marino
- Incumbent
- Assumed office 26 June 2026

Deputy Head of the Office of the President of Ukraine
- In office 13 March 2021 – 3 March 2026

Personal details
- Born: 1980 (age 45–46)
- Education: Taras Shevchenko National University of Kyiv; Ukrainian State University of Finance and International Trade
- Occupation: politician, diplomat

Ihor Brusylo (Ukrainian: Ігор Михайлович Брусило; born 1980) is a Ukrainian politician and diplomat. He was Deputy Head of the Office of the President of Ukraine from March 2021 to March 2026, when he was appointed Ukraine's ambassador to Italy. He has also served as Ukraine's ambassador to San Marino and Malta concurrently since 26 June 2026.

== Early life ==
Ihor Brusylo was born in 1980.

He graduated with honors from the Taras Shevchenko National University of Kyiv for the specialty “Translation” and the Ukrainian State University of Finance and International Trade for the specialty “International Law”.

== Career ==
From 2002 to 2005, he worked in the Administration of the President of Ukraine.

In 2005–2007, Ihor Brusylo worked in the Apparatus of the Verkhovna Rada of Ukraine.

From 2007 to 2011 — in the diplomatic service at the Embassy of Ukraine in the Italian Republic.

In 2011–2012, he worked in the Apparatus of the Verkhovna Rada of Ukraine.

From 2012 to 2021, he was the chief consultant, head of the department, deputy head of the department, first deputy head of the service, head of the State Protocol and Ceremonials of Ukraine of the Office of the President of Ukraine.

By decree of the President of Ukraine on March 17, 2021, he was appointed Deputy Head of the Office of the President of Ukraine.

In March 2026, Zelenskyy appointed him as Ukraine's ambassador to Italy.

In June 2026, Zelenskyy also appointed him as Ukraine's ambassador to San Marino and Malta.

== Personal life ==
He is married and has one daughter.
