= Diplomatic uniform =

Uniforms worn by diplomats on formal occasions

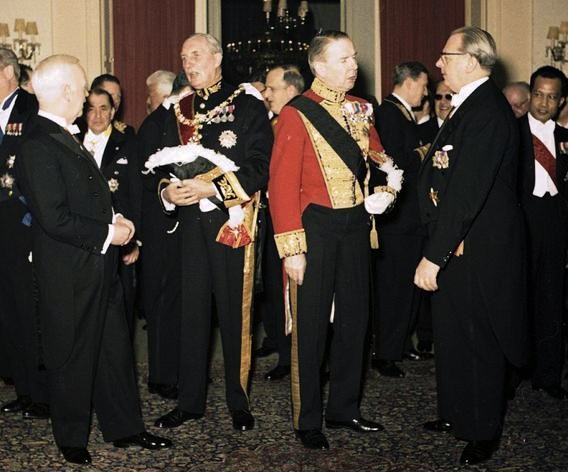
Diplomatic reception, West Germany, 1961. The Danish ambassador wears a red diplomatic uniform, the British ambassador a dark one.

Diplomatic uniforms are ornate uniforms worn by diplomats from some countries at public occasions. Introduced by European states around 1800 and patterned on court dress, they were abandoned by most countries in the twentieth century, but diplomats from some countries retain them for rare, formal occasions.

== History ==
Until the late 18th century, diplomats (who usually belonged to the high nobility) wore their own court clothing to solemn occasions. Diplomatic uniforms were first introduced by France in 1781 and widely adopted by other European nations around 1800 in the course of administrative reforms undertaken as a response to the French Revolution and the Napoleonic Wars. In several countries, diplomatic uniforms were among the first civilian (as opposed to military) uniforms to be adopted. Apart from saving diplomats (who now increasingly were not independently wealthy) the expense of maintaining a full court wardrobe, diplomatic uniforms served to emphasize the importance of the office and to deemphasize the person of its holder.

Several non-European courts adopted European-style diplomatic uniforms during the 19th century. Notably, Japan during the Meiji Revolution introduced European uniforms instead of traditional clothing for all officials in 1872. The Ottoman court was another non-European court that adopted the uniforms, which were introduced during the Tanzimat period. The final period during which the majority of diplomatic services retained formal uniforms for the accredited members of their overseas missions was that prior to World War II.

A detailed study of contemporary uniforms, both military and civil, published in 1929 gives descriptions of the diplomatic uniforms still being worn by representatives of the majority of states then in existence. These included most European nations and a number of Latin American and Asian countries. It is however noted that several states which had only been created following World War I, had not adopted diplomatic uniforms and that others had discarded them. The uniforms described are nearly all of the traditional style of bicorne hat and tailcoat with braiding according to grade, from third secretaries to ambassadors. Consular staff were less likely to have authorised uniforms than their diplomatic colleagues and where consular uniforms existed they were generally of simpler style. As an example, the British Consular Service had silver braiding rather than the gold of diplomats.

While most countries abandoned diplomatic uniforms at some time during the 20th century, several long-established foreign services have retained them for wear by senior staff on ceremonial occasions such as the formal presentation of credentials by ambassadors. A photo of the 2001 New Year's reception at the Vatican shows the ambassadors of Monaco, the Netherlands, Thailand, the United Kingdom, Spain, France, and Belgium all clad in diplomatic uniform. In recent decades, some ambassadors from Cambodia, Denmark, France, Italy, Portugal, and Kyrgyzstan have also been seen in uniform at the presentation of their credentials.

== Design ==
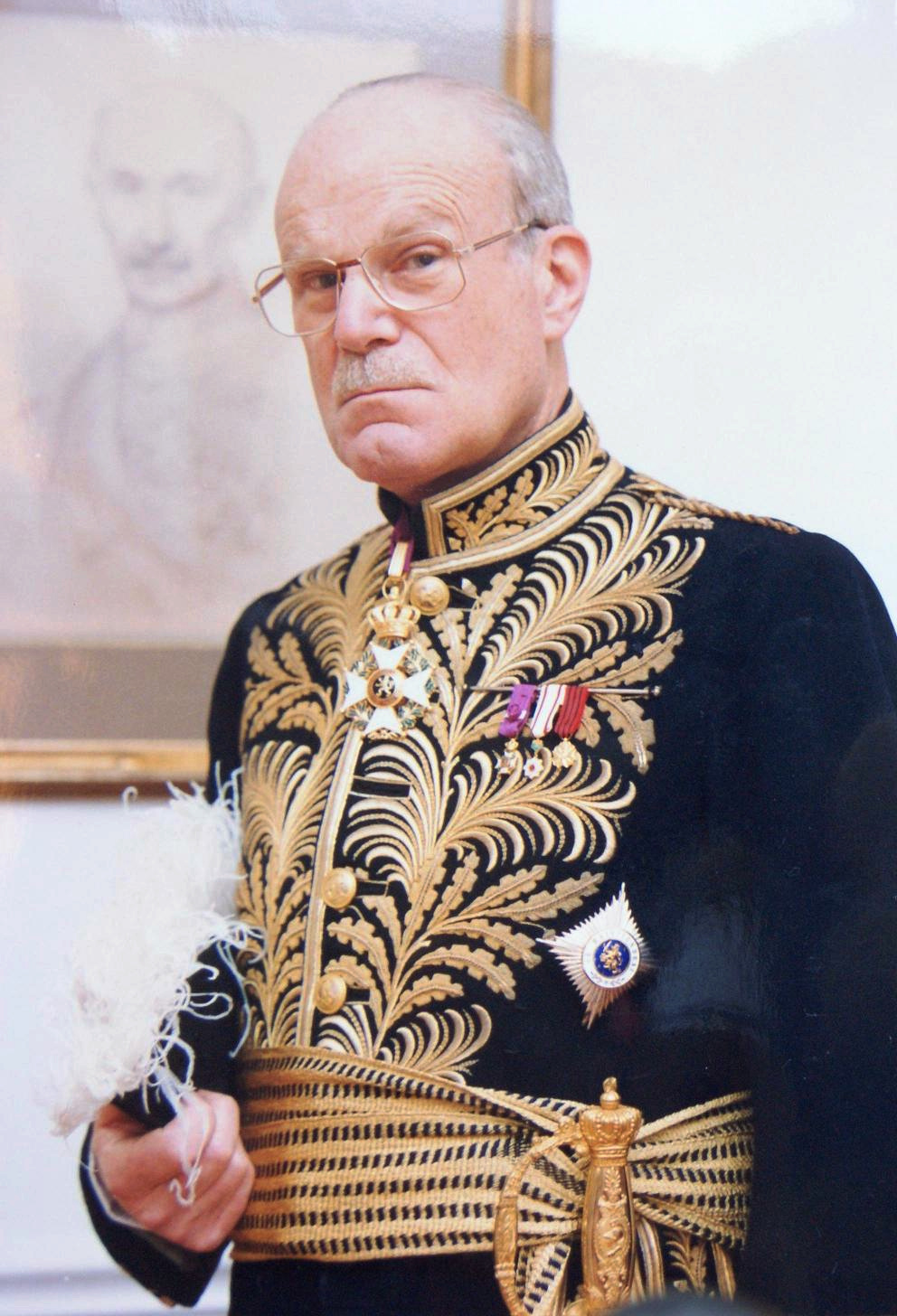
Baron Henri Beyens, wearing Belgian diplomatic uniform (2011)

Diplomatic uniforms generally followed 19th century court fashion and usually included a tailcoat with standing collar, breeches or pantaloons, a sword and a two-cornered plumed hat ("bicorne"). There were normally at least two versions, a dress uniform for ceremonial events and a simpler version for less formal occasions which nevertheless required the use of uniform dress. Unlike their military and naval counterparts, diplomats did not wear uniforms for everyday purposes but substituted the appropriate civilian clothing.

Diplomatic uniforms were usually richly embroidered with gold similar to the uniforms of high court officials. Diplomatic rank was distinguished by the amount and quality of the embroidery. In contrast to military uniforms, which underwent rapid changes throughout the 19th and early 20th century, the diplomatic uniforms tended to keep their traditional design. While the uniforms of the different foreign services generally shared the common features noted above, there were considerable national differences, though often of minor detail.

Thus, as examples, French ambassadors were distinguished by pearl-handled court swords with gold and silk frogs (sword attachments), their Portuguese colleagues by oak leaves and acorns represented in gold embroidery on their dress coats, while Norwegian diplomats wore gold embroidery of pine cone design on their dark blue "swallow-tail" coats. Belgian diplomats of all ranks had "royal blue" tail coats and retained the 18th century fashion of white breeches and stockings with low shoes. Today, Belgian diplomats wear blue and gold waist sashes, Spanish diplomats red cuffs on their dark blue tail-coats, and Danish diplomats distinctive red coats.

== By country ==
=== France ===
Elaborately embroidered dress for French diplomats, counsellors of state and other high ranking civilian officials evolved during the Second Empire. These in turn served as a model for othe European states, being known as habits à la francaise (French clothes). Worn for ceremonial occasions by all ranks of the diplomatic service until World War II, these richly decorated garments were retained for ambassadors only until 1960.

=== Germany ===
In 1817, Prussian diplomats received as uniforms dark blue tail coats with cuffs and a standing collar of black velvet, decorated with oak leaf scrolls embroidered in gold. In 1888, the German Empire introduced the Altbrandenburgischer Waffenrock, a long military-style coat, as the general state uniform for high-ranking officials. Military uniform was worn instead of court uniform by military officers and by those political figures who were reserve officers, which included most diplomats. It was practically impossible under the Empire for one to be a civil servant or a state secretary of ministerial rank without also being a reserve officer.

Diplomatic uniforms were abandoned under the Weimar Republic, but the Nazi regime, which had a general fondness for uniforms, reintroduced them. The stage designer Benno von Arent designed the "startling" Nazi diplomatic uniform, consisting of a dark blue tailcoat whose modern lapels were embroidered with silver oak leaves, a silver sash, a silver aiguillette and a small dagger.

=== Italy ===
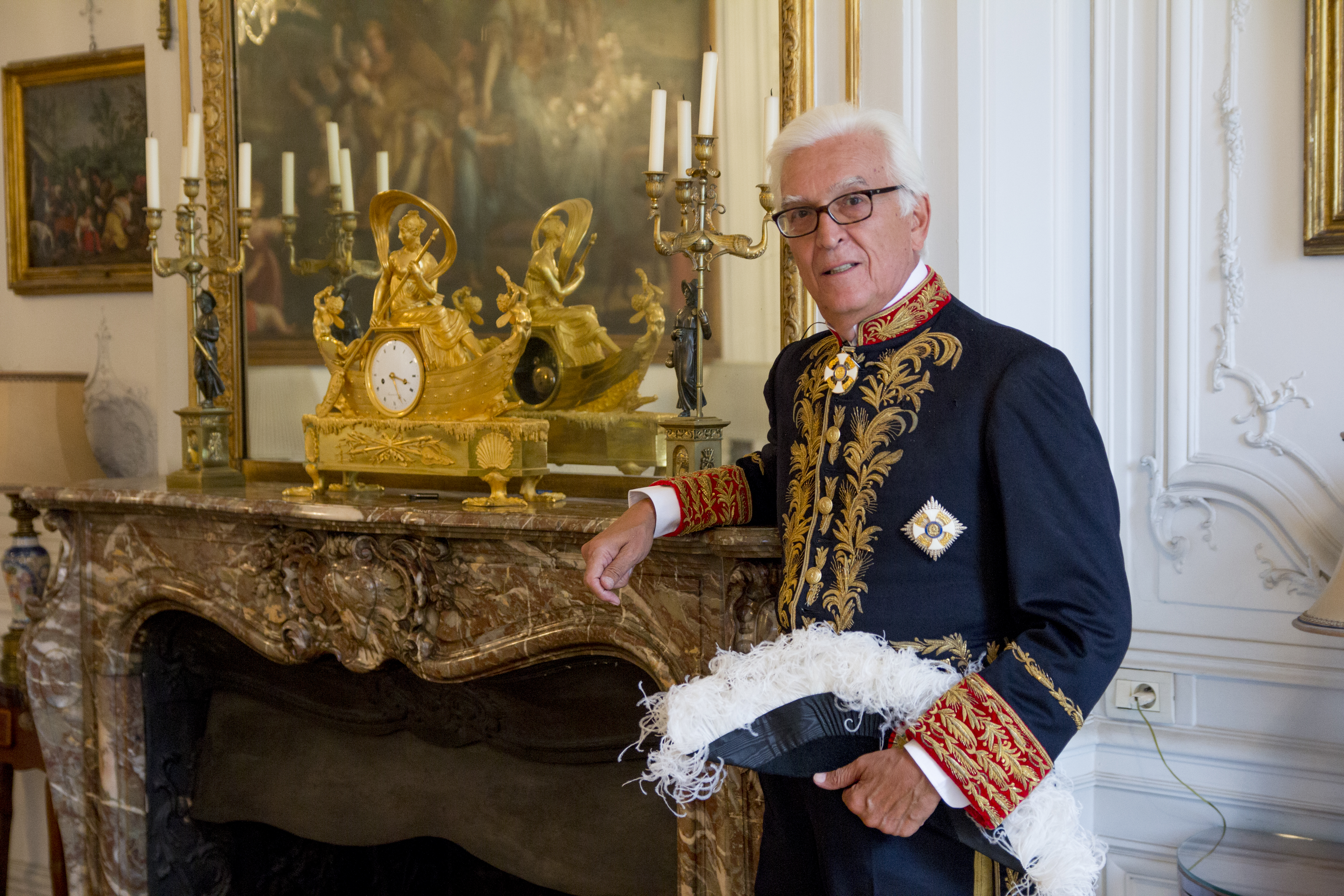
Ambassador Alfredo Bastianelli wearing the current diplomatic uniform with insignia of Grand Officer of the Order of Merit of the Italian Republic

Royal Decree No. 1038 of 8 March 1928 established uniforms for diplomatic and consular officers, consular commissioners and interpreters. The uniform was of dark turquoise blue, except for a hot-weather version which was white. By Decree of the President of the Republic No. 1125 of 21 June 1948, Fascist and royal emblems were replaced with republican symbols. Subsequently, the decreto legge of 25 June 2008, No. 112, converted into law on 6 August 2008, No. 133, in particular the article No. 24, annex "A" No. 334, repealed the 1928 royal decree. Currently it is not clear whether the diplomatic uniform is still formally authorised or not, since the 1948 presidential decree has not been repealed.

=== Japan ===
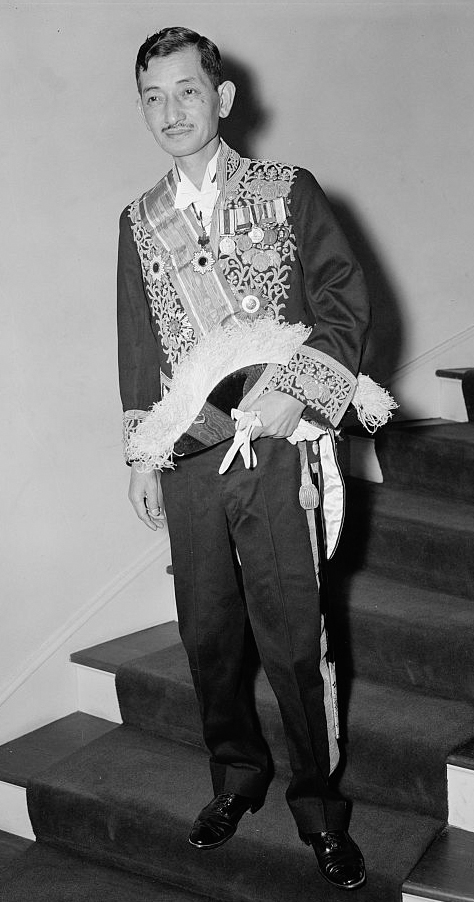
Hiroshi Saitō, the Japanese ambassador to the United States, wearing the Imperial Japanese diplomatic uniform with its distinctive paulownia embroidery (1937)

Following the Meiji Restoration, the Dajō-kan released an edict on 12 December 1872, implementing regulations for the uniforms of civil officials and nobles, and issuing another edict on 29 December of that year regulating their proper wear. Three of the highest subcategories of civil officials were allocated specific court (diplomatic) uniforms: Imperial appointees (勅任官, chokuninkan), non-Imperially appointed senior officials (奏任官, sōninkan), and junior officials (判任官, hanninkan).

On 4 December 1886, the designs of the court uniforms for civil officials were modified, but the designs for junior officials were not updated; due to the high cost of formal court dress, junior civil officials wore standard white tie court dress from then on. On 2 March 1908, an Imperial edict established substitute court uniforms for diplomats dispatched to the tropics or very hot areas. Later, on 29 September 1926, another Imperial edict established alternative court uniforms and court dress, consisting of white tropical tunics, for Japanese officials in the South Pacific.

The standard diplomatic uniform for officials in the three primary categories of the Imperial Japanese diplomatic service (chokuninkan, sōninkan and hanninkan) consisted of a black wool frock coat with gold-embroidered paulownia flowers (chokuninkan) or buds (sōninkan and hanninkan) with gold-embroidered paulownia leaves and ornamentation in patterns and in areas of the coat corresponding to the respective category. The uniform coat was worn with a wool vest (waistcoat) in black or dark gray (chokuninkan and sōninkan) or in navy blue (hanninkan), with wool trousers in the same colors, again corresponding to category. All officials in the three primary categories wore a plumed bicorne hat with their uniforms, with the right side of the hat embellished according to category. Civil officials below the hanninkan level used standard white-tie court dress. However, the higher-ranking among these affixed symbols of their ranks to each cuff.

Diplomats who were also peers (華族, kazoku) could also wear the established uniforms corresponding to their rank, as could former or serving officers of the Imperial Japanese military.

Japanese court and diplomatic dress ceased to be worn after World War II, with the abolition of the pertinent Imperial Household Agency edicts (effective 2 May 1947) and the pertinent Dajō-kan edicts on 1 July 1954, respectively.

=== Poland ===
The Second Polish Republic used diplomatic uniforms, similar to other European countries. Ambassadors and ministers had full embroidery of oak leaves on their chests, collars and cuffs, and white ostrich feathers on a bicorne. Counsellors did not have full embroidery on their chests, but had similar collars and cuffs to Ambassadors. Secretaries were similar to counsellors but did not have embroidery on the collar. Counsellors, secretaries and attachés had black ostrich feathers on a bicorne. Consuls and their staff did not have feathers in bicornes or full embroidery on their chest. Sabres were also used, and buttons on the uniform had a depiction of the Polish eagle.

The Third Polish Republic, however, does not use diplomatic uniform.

=== Portugal ===
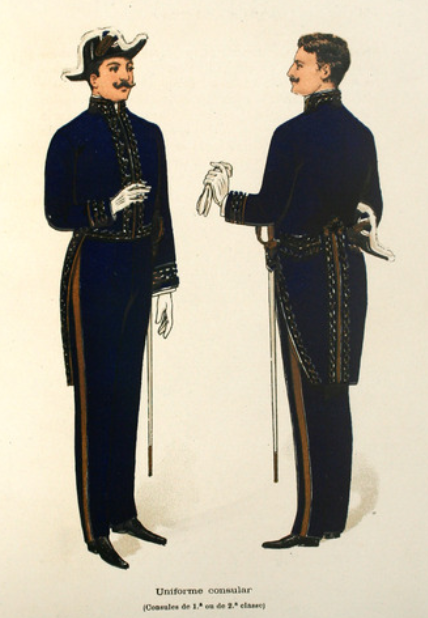
Portuguese diplomatic uniform (Consul, First or Second Class), 1907; it remains mostly identical to the one still in use today.

Although the diplomatic uniform was already in use during the Portuguese Constitutional Monarchy, the first official description of the diplomatic uniform was only coded into law on 4 January 1913, in order to expressly harmonise it with the new national symbols of the Portuguese Republic, established as a result of the 5 October 1910 revolution. The matter of an updated uniform bearing the new national symbols not having been issued shortly following the revolution had been noticed as early as 1911, when Manuel Teixeira Gomes, the first Minister Plenipotentiary to be sent to the Court of St James's by the republican government, had to present his credentials to King George V in "evening dress with trousers".

The diplomatic uniform, as described in the 1913 decree, comprised "dark blue gold-striped cloth trousers and a single-breasted coatee of the same cloth with a stand collar". For heads of mission, First and Second Class, the coatee's collar, chest, cuffs, pocket flaps and tails edge were all to be decorated with gold embroidery; lower-rank diplomats did not bear gold embroidery on their chest. The buttons were gilt and bore the national coat of arms. The sword should bear the same arms, and was mounted on an embroidered sword belt. The uniform was worn with a cocked hat with a black feather border. The decree stipulated the diplomatic uniform was to be worn during ceremonies and "in those countries in which the use of a diplomatic uniform is deemed necessary". It also prescribed an alternative uniform for use "in countries where it is customary to wear [such a uniform]": "dark blue cloth trousers and a coatee of the same cloth, to be worn unbuttoned, with a velvet collar and gilt buttons embossed with the arms of the Portuguese Republic; a waistcoat of the same cloth and bearing identical buttons, and white tie".

On 19 September 1940, a ministerial order issued by the Ministry of Foreign Affairs made slight changes to the uniforms to further distinguish those with the rank of Ambassador: it added a further gold embroidered trim of intertwined oak and olive-leaf along the edge of the chest embroidery, continuing along the edge of the tails, as well as an identical trim around the edge of the cuffs. The cocked hat for Ambassadors, was now to be lined with white feathers, as opposed to the black feathers worn by those of inferior diplomatic rank.

According to Bouza Serrano, there is a tradition amongst members of the Portuguese diplomatic service to keep their uniforms unaltered and not add the additional oak-leaf gold embroidery on the chest upon reaching the rank of Ambassador. This served to distinguish between career diplomats and political appointees, the latter of which were immediately entitled to use the elaborately embroidered uniform; the former retained their less ornate uniform from their time as Counsellor as a mark of seniority, changing only the colour of the feathers on the edging of their hats from black to white.

Although they are not mentioned in the pieces of legislation that describe the diplomatic uniform, it is customary to wear white gloves as part of the full uniform. At indoors receptions in Portugal (usually, that means at the palaces of Ajuda, Queluz, or, less often, Necessidades), neither gloves, nor cocked hat, nor sword are worn.

=== Russia and the Soviet Union ===
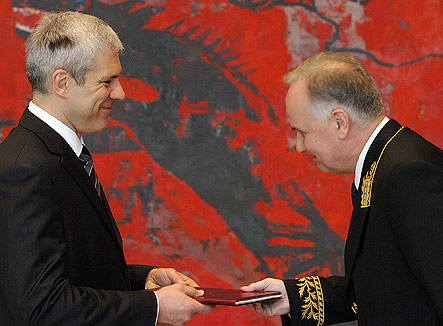
Russian ambassador Alexander Konuzin in uniform, presenting his letters of credence to the Serbian President Boris Tadić, 2008

In 1834, the Russian Empire introduced diplomatic uniforms. As worn until 1917 these were of dark green (almost black) cloth with bicorn hats and braiding according to rank. Regulations introduced in 1904 specified six variations of the dark green uniform, depending on the nature of the occasion for which it was worn. These included plain uniforms without gold braid for office wear, plus white knee breeches and stocking for court functions when royalty were present. Peaked caps and epaulettes of military style were specified for street wear or informal occasions when the bicorn or braided tailcoat was considered unsuitable.

After the Russian Revolution, a document entitled "Short Instruction on Adhering to the Accepted Bourgeois Society Etiquette Rules" by the People's Commissariat for Foreign Affairs (NKID) instructed the revolutionary diplomats to wear jackets on formal occasions. From 1923 to 1924, Moscow newspapers debated whether the wearing of civilian Western dress and thereby "bourgeois society symbols, which are totally alien to the spirit of the Workers' and Peasants' State" was appropriate, and there were calls for a Soviet diplomatic uniform to be introduced.

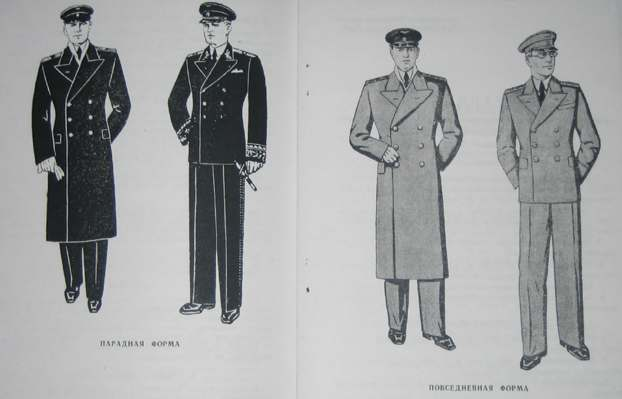
Image from the 1943 Soviet regulations concerning the diplomatic uniform

But it was not until 1943 that a uniform was introduced for NKID staff, consisting of a three-piece uniform suit with gold-plated buttons and shoulder straps. The everyday uniform was grey and the dress uniform, which included a dagger, was black. Accoutrements included a coat, raincoat, hat and an ornate cap with the diplomatic insignia. The black dress uniform was similar to the Nazi SS uniform; the Soviet diplomat Victor Israelyan recounted that during World War II he was once given the Hitler salute and a loud "Heil Hitler!" by a German prisoner of war who mistook him for an SS officer.

The wearing of uniform by all Soviet diplomats on formal occasions was officially discontinued in 1954; thereafter only ambassadors continued to wear the dress uniform, without the dagger, on special occasions. Senior officials of the Soviet Ministry of Foreign Affairs still wore a double-breasted black uniform (or white for the ones assigned to a country with a tropical climate) with gold braided cuffs and collar patches when attending credential presentations by foreign ambassadors, as late as the 1980s. Following the breakup of the Soviet Union these uniforms ceased to be worn in 1991, though they were not formally abolished. In 2001 a black diplomatic uniform was re-introduced resembling the former Soviet model except for new insignia and blue-green collar patches. Russia now maintains such uniforms for wear on rare occasions.

=== Spain ===
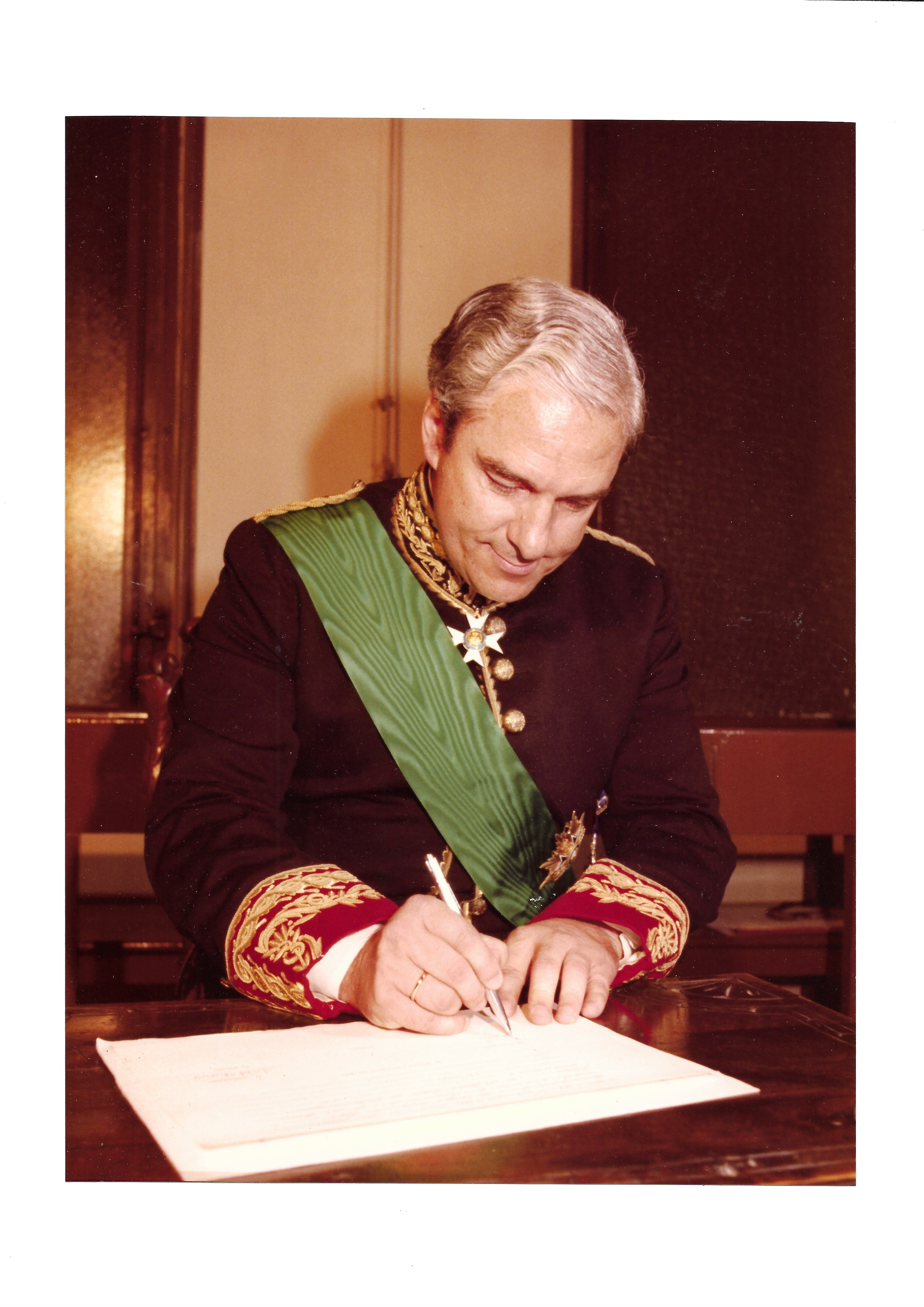
Spanish diplomatic uniform (worn by Vicente Blanco Gaspar).

The Spanish diplomatic uniform is among the few still in active use, retained primarily by monarchies for ceremonial gala occasions. Its design has changed little since the nineteenth century. Following the unification of the Spanish diplomatic and consular career tracks in 1928, a single uniform model has applied to all members of the service. The identifying symbols and regulations governing its use were codified in the Organic Regulations of the Diplomatic Career (Reglamento Orgánico de la Carrera Diplomática) of 15 July 1955, with current specifications defined by the Ministerial Order of 3 October 1997, published in the Boletín Oficial del Estado.

The men's uniform consists of a dark navy blue tailcoat bearing three embroidered lyres distributed across the back. The stand collar, 5 cm wide, is embroidered with bullion, herringbone trim, palms, and oak leaves. The chest closes with nine large gilt buttons engraved with the constitutional coat of arms, and the shoulder boards carry a twisted gold cord secured by a smaller gilt button bearing the same device. The most visually distinctive feature of the Spanish uniform is its red cloth cuffs (bocamangas), embroidered with a design of palms and oak leaves matching that of the pocket flaps. All edges are trimmed with bullion and herringbone work. The coat is lined in white satin at the upper body and red satin in the tails. Blue trousers with a 50 mm gold thread stripe along the side complete the garment. The uniform is worn with a bicorne hat, black shoes, and a dress sword suspended from a sword belt on the left side.

Diplomatic rank is distinguished both by the complexity of embroidery and by the colour of the bicorne's feathers: ambassadors wear white plumes, while all other ranks wear black. Ambassadors additionally bear double embroidery of palms and oak leaves in figure-eight patterns on the collar and cuffs, with further palm embroidery across the chest front.

A women's version of the uniform was established under the same 1997 order. It consists of a short dark blue wool jacket with the same collar embroidery as the men's uniform, closing with seven gilt buttons, and red cloth cuffs embroidered in the same motifs. The skirt reaches the ankle in a fitted tube silhouette with a long slit for ease of movement.

The uniform is worn on formal occasions such as the presentation of credentials and royal receptions. It continues to be worn at posts including the Holy See, and Spain receives foreign ambassadors presenting credentials at the Royal Palace of Madrid.

=== Sweden ===
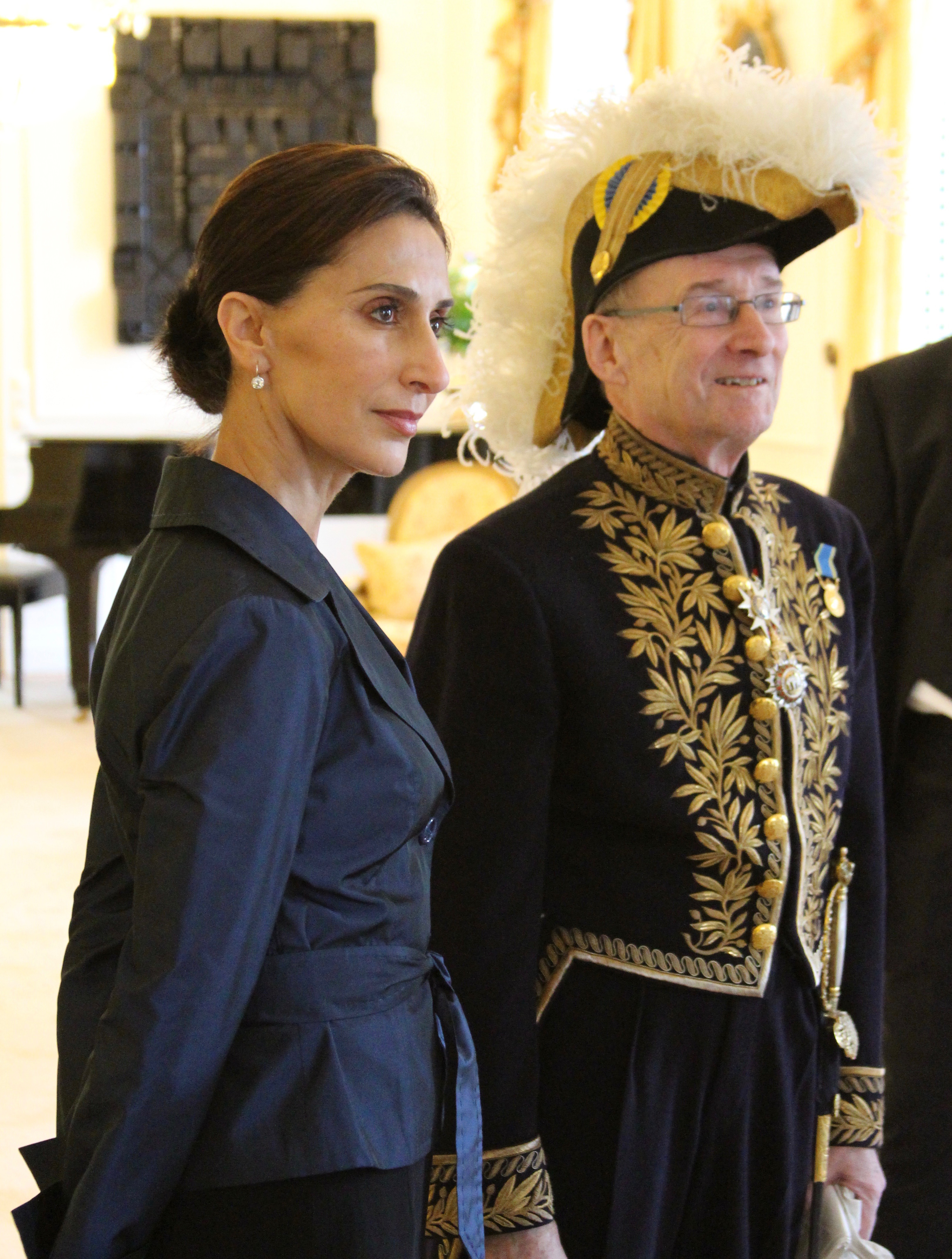
Bertil Roth (right), wearing Swedish diplomatic uniform, introducing the U.S. Ambassador to Sweden, Azita Raji, 2016

The current Swedish diplomatic uniform consists of a dark blue tailcoat with gold olive-leaf embroidery on the collar, chest and cuffs with gilt buttons. Dark blue trousers with gold stripes, dark blue cape and a bicorne with a white plume are also worn, plus white gloves and a gilt smallsword.

The diplomatic uniform is typically worn by Swedish officials accompanying foreign ambassadors to their presentation of credentials ceremony in Stockholm.

=== Switzerland ===
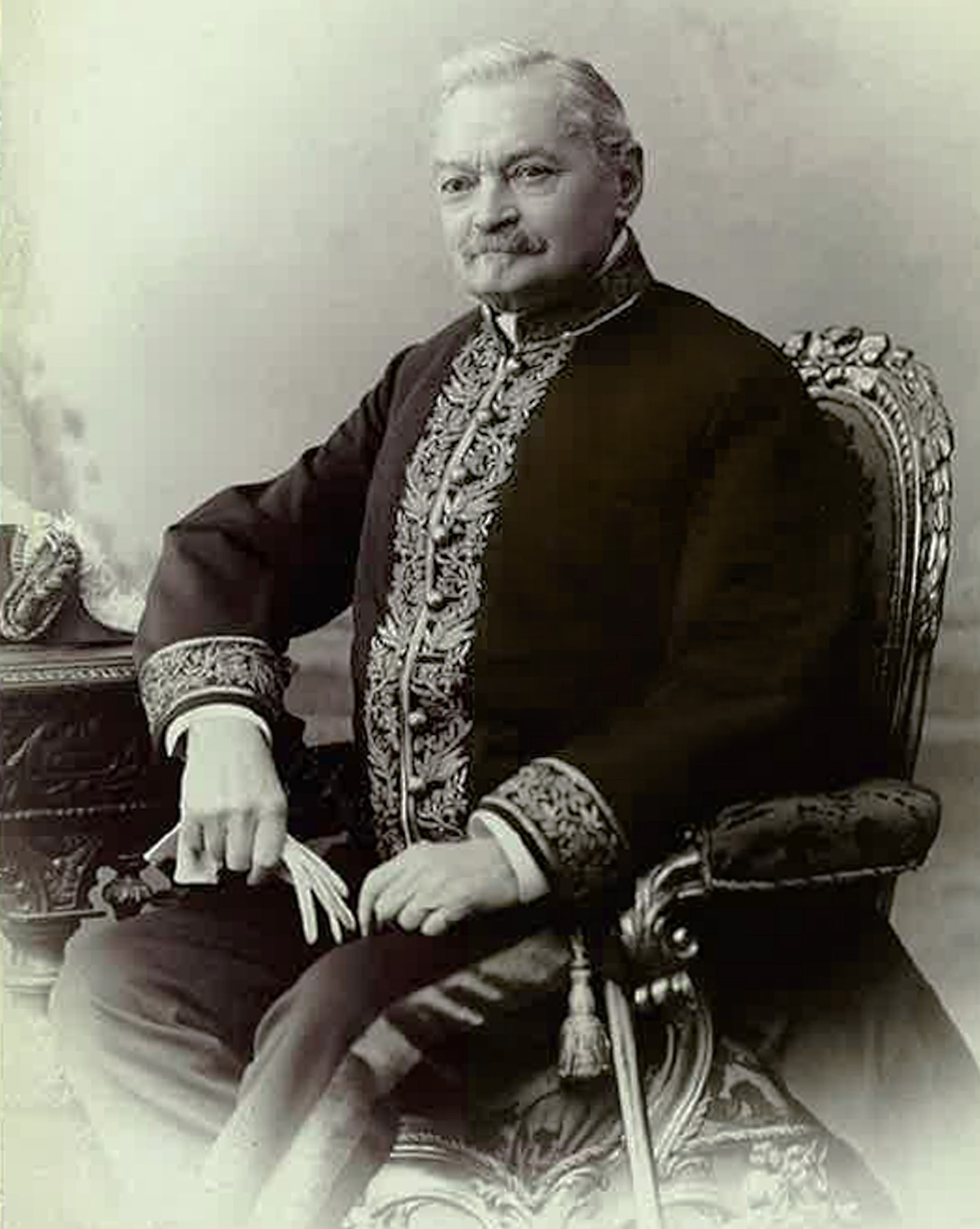
The Swiss diplomat Arnold Otto Aepli in uniform as ambassador to Austria, 1890s

The 1915 regulations of the Federal Political Department instructed Swiss diplomats to wear "a uniform or a tailcoat (white tie)" when presenting their letters of credence. Swiss diplomats received a blue "Alpine rose tailcoat", a uniform with gold-embroidered alpine roses and edelweiss (the Swiss national flowers), for use on formal occasions. They could, however, wear a black tailcoat (white tie) or their own military uniform instead.

The uniform appears to have been abandoned some time after World War II, in the course of the democratisation of the diplomatic service and the introduction of an admission competition, the concours diplomatique, developed by Walter Stucki and introduced in 1956. That the loss of their uniform dismayed some diplomats is reflected in the existence, as of 1987, of an "association for the reintroduction of the diplomatic uniform", founded and led by State Secretary Franz Blankart.

=== United Kingdom ===
==== Historical ====
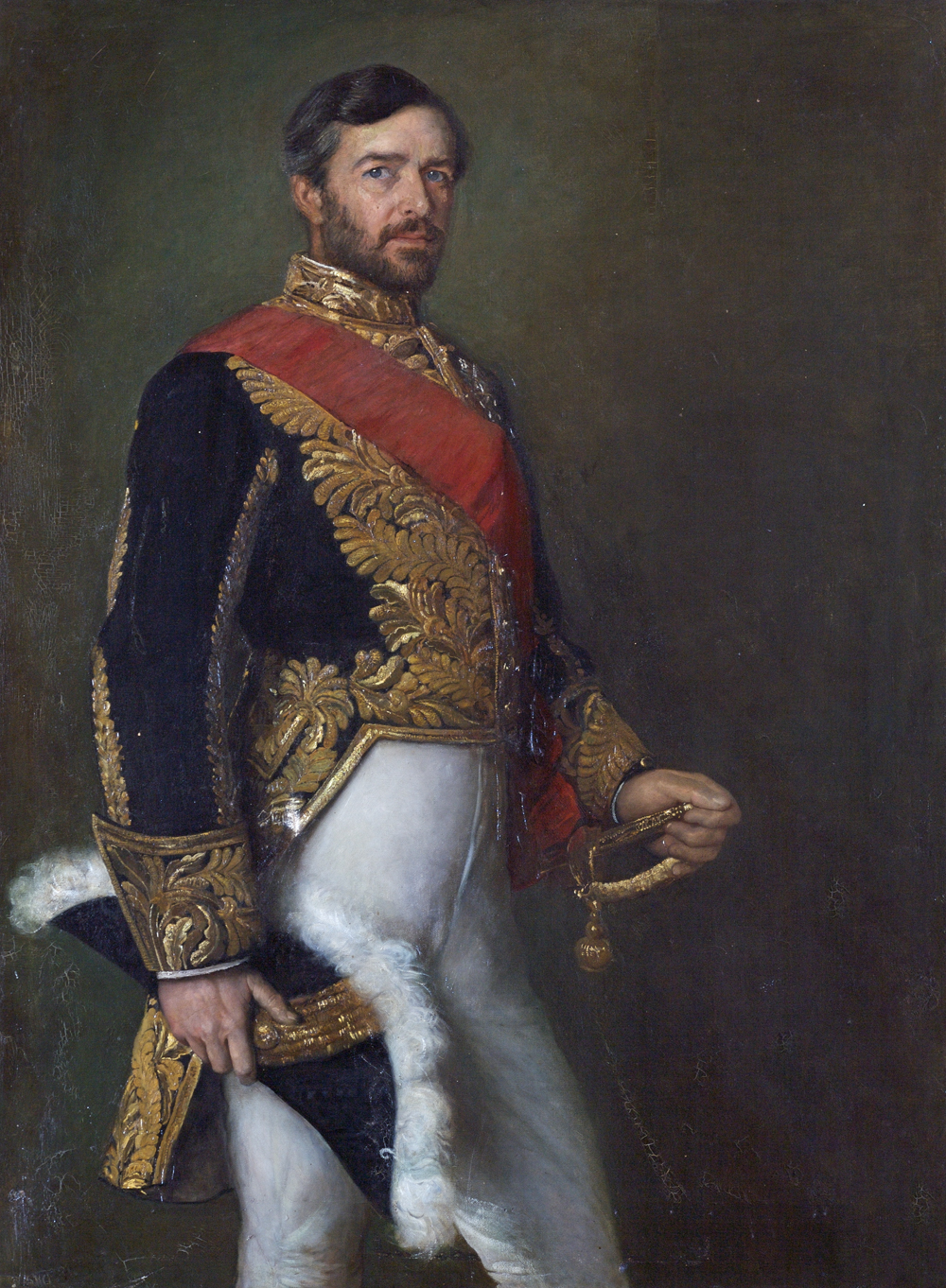
Sir Edward Malet wearing the old-style ambassador's uniform

British diplomats wore the official court uniform consisting of a dark blue high-collar tailcoat with gold oak-leaf embroidery on the collar, chest, cuffs and long tails; white breeches were worn, or else dark blue trousers with gold stripes, and a cocked hat edged with white ostrich plumes. A white uniform, with similar but detachable panels of gold embroidery on the collar and cuffs, was worn in tropical postings.

Ambassadors wore '1st Class' court uniform, with additional gold embroidery on the sleeve and back seams. More junior officers wore different classes of uniform with simplified braiding on cuffs and collars only, as specified for their rank or appointment, (the classes of uniform were differentiated by varying widths of gold embroidery). Members of the Consular Service wore court uniforms with silver braiding according to rank, in contrast to the gold of diplomatic officers. The King's or Queen's Foreign Service Messengers were entitled to '5th Class' court uniform, upgraded to '4th Class' in 1929.

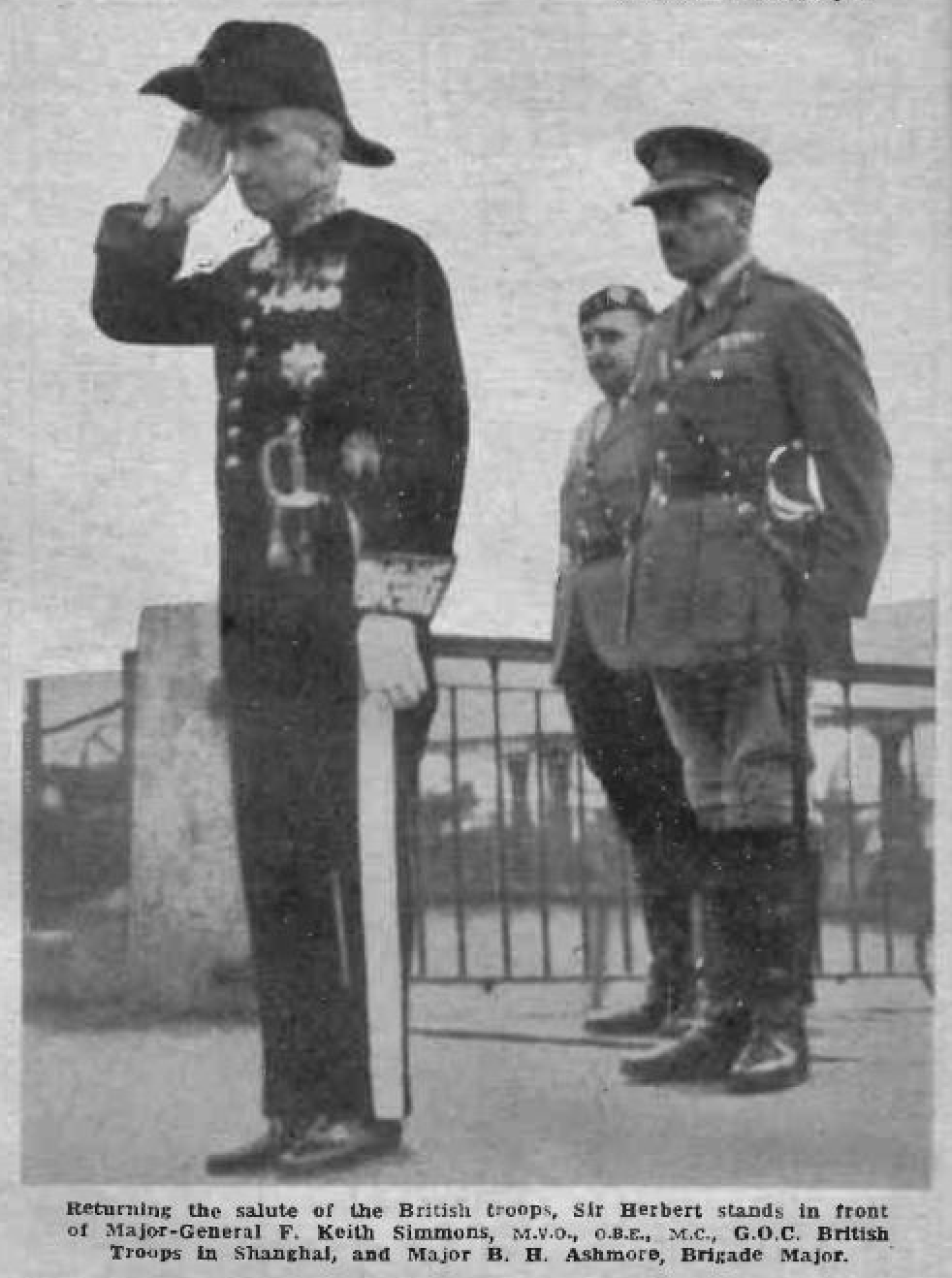
Sir Herbert Phillips, British Consul General, in full consular uniform on his departure from Shanghai in 1940

In 1953 the uniform regulations were revised. The new Foreign Service uniform was 'to be worn at diplomatic and consular posts alike'. Until about 1965 Foreign Office Regulations and Consular Instructions required even junior foreign service officers to acquire this formal dress, following completion of their probation period. However, by the end of the 20th century the use of this uniform had greatly diminished.

==== Current ====
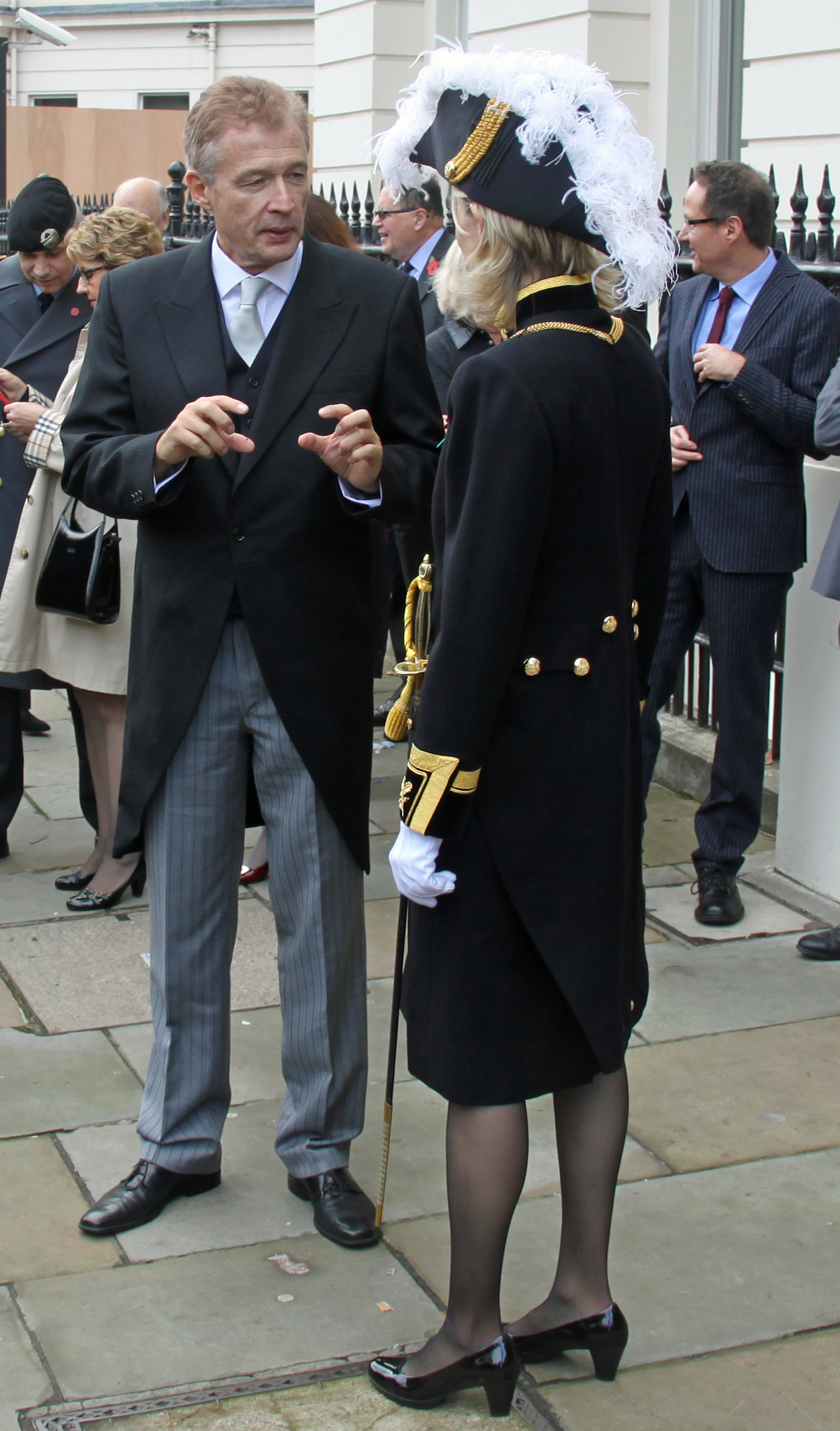
Female UK diplomatic uniform, as worn by the Vice-Marshal of the Diplomatic Corps in 2014

Diplomatic uniform is still worn in certain jurisdictions by members of His Majesty's Diplomatic Service on formal occasions such as the presentation of credentials. As worn by Deputy Heads of Mission, the uniform consists of a dark blue single-breasted tail coat, lined with black silk, with gilt buttons; the stand collar and gauntlet cuffs are faced with black velvet and edged with gold lace. It is worn with dark trousers or skirt, a bicorn hat, white gloves and a gold-mounted sword. Heads of Mission have, in addition, gold embroidery on the collar and cuffs, gold stripes on the trousers and a white ostrich-feather edging to the hat.

Jurisdictions where it is worn include the Holy See, Spain and Thailand. In addition, it is worn by the Permanent Under-Secretary of State for Foreign and Commonwealth Affairs and by certain senior Foreign Office officials. A tropical version is also worn (e.g. in Thailand and Malaysia). A version for women was introduced in 2013; previously they only had the option of a silver-gilt badge of office (the royal cypher encircled by the words "Her Majesty's Diplomatic Service") hung from a Garter-blue ribbon bow.

=== United States ===
American diplomats were first issued uniforms for the mission concluding the 1814 Treaty of Ghent; these consisted of a blue gold-embroidered coat, white breeches and stockings, a sword and a cocked hat with a black cockade. U.S. diplomats routinely designed and wore uniforms of their own choosing until 1817, when the State Department formally prescribed a uniform for ministers based on the one issued for the Ghent mission. This uniform was recommended for use by all ministers abroad by Secretary of State John Quincy Adams in 1823.

The Jackson administration simplified the uniform in 1829, which now consisted of a black coat with a gold star on each side of the collar, black or white breeches, a three-cornered chapeau de bras (i.e., a foldable tricorne hat), a black cockade and eagle, and a steel-mounted sword with white scabbard. This uniform was not mandatory, and some officials wore more brilliant uniforms according to their own taste. In 1853, Secretary of State William L. Marcy issued a circular recommending that U.S. diplomats wear "the simple dress of an American citizen."

In response to what was perceived as the excessive ostentatiousness of some of these individualized uniforms, Congress then temporarily banned uniforms altogether in 1867 due to the rather showy nature of some of the individualized outfits. This caused some discomfort to American diplomats, who now had to appear "underdressed", in evening dress, to official functions. In 1910, Theodore Roosevelt attracted considerable attention when he was one of the few foreign representatives at the funeral of King Edward VII who was not in civil or military uniform.

For a period of time, U.S. diplomats and consular officers wore modified U.S. Navy uniforms, much as the U.S. Public Health Service Commissioned Corps and U.S. National Oceanic and Atmospheric Administration Commissioned Corps continue to do so today. In 1937, President Franklin D. Roosevelt issued an executive order directing that no person in the diplomatic or consular service should wear a uniform or official costume not previously authorized by the United States Congress.

While there has continued to be discussion on the idea of reintroducing uniforms for the U.S. Foreign Service, such as a modified U.S. Navy mess dress for formal occasions and presentation of credentials, such a change would require a law passed by Congress, since it is specified in the Foreign Service Act of 1946, section 1001, that "no officer or employee" of the Foreign Service was to "wear any uniform except such as may be authorized by law."
