= National Order of Merit (Gabon) =

State order of Gabon

National Order of Merit Ordre National du Mérite
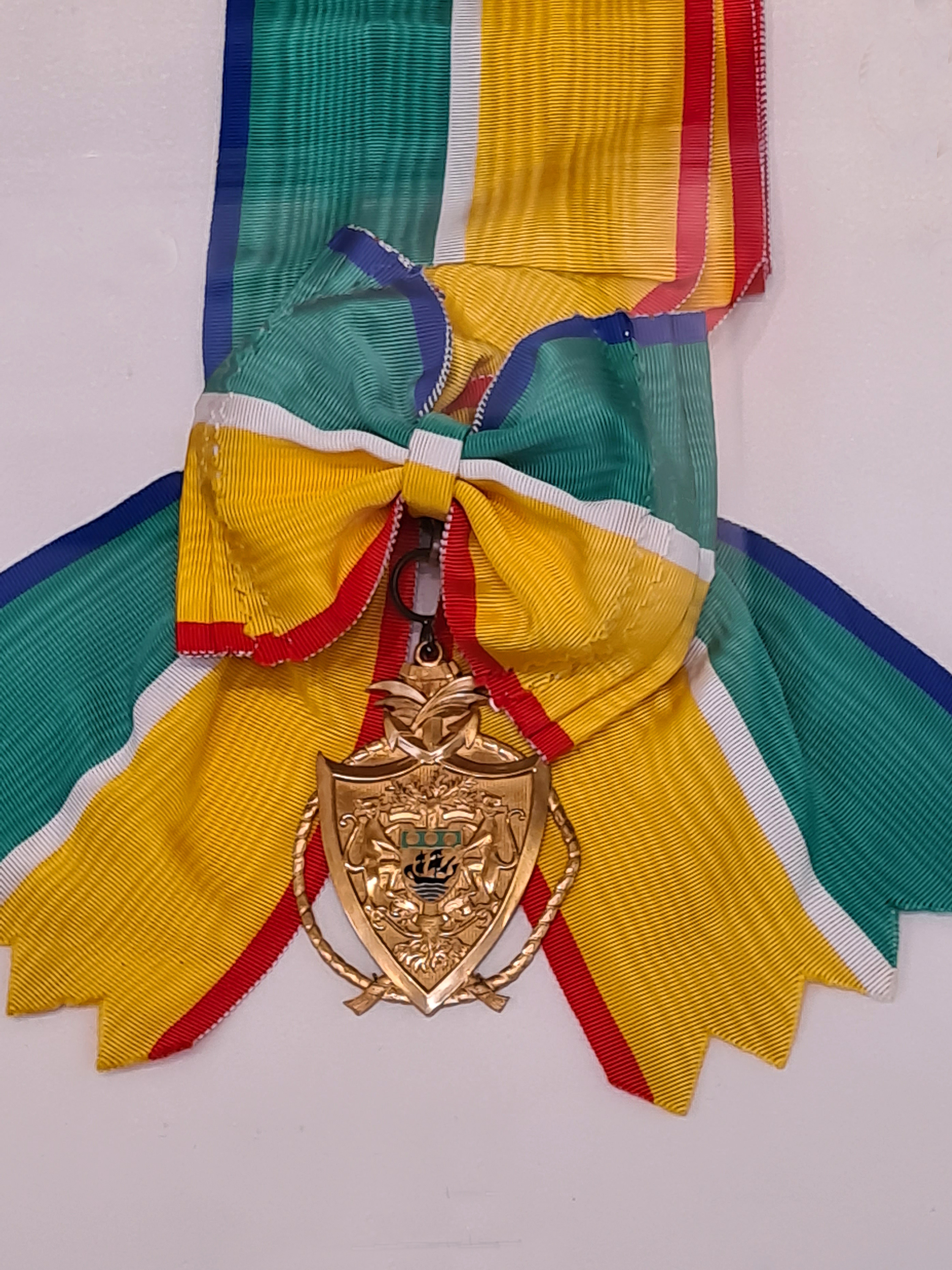
- Grand Cross of the National Order of Merit

Awarded by Gabon
- Type: National order
- Awarded for: personal merit and service to the nation, both civil and military.
- Status: Active
- Grand Master: President of Gabon
- Grades: Grand Cross; Grand Officer; Commander; Officer; Knight

Precedence
- Next (higher): Order of the Equatorial Star
- Ribbon of the order

The National Order of Merit (French: Ordre National du Mérite) is a state order of the Gabonese Republic. The Order was instituted in 1971 and is awarded in five grades to both Gabonese and foreign nationals. It rewards civil and military services as well as professional practice dedicated to the State. The Grand Master of the Gabonese National Order of Merit is the Head of the Gabonese State.

== Grades ==
Ribbons of the National Order of Merit
Grand Cross	Grand Officer	Commander	Officer	Knight

== Recipients ==
Among the recipients are:

- Pierre-Emerick Aubameyang
- Omar Bongo
- Ali Bongo Ondimba
- Paul Boundoukou-Latha
- Georges Catroux
- Manuel Corte-Real
- Michael Jackson
- Jean-Pierre Kelche
- Pascal Lamy
- Imelda Marcos
- Marie-Madeleine Mborantsuo
- Henri Minko
- Ben Moreell
- Séraphin Moundounga
- Charles-Ferdinand Nothomb
- Jean Ping
- Rose Christiane Raponda
- Abdulla Shahid
- Louis Sanmarco
- Al Waleed bin Talal Al Saud
- Tristan Vieljeux
