= José de Bouza Serrano =

Portuguese diplomat

His Excellency José de Bouza Serrano GCIH OIH GCM
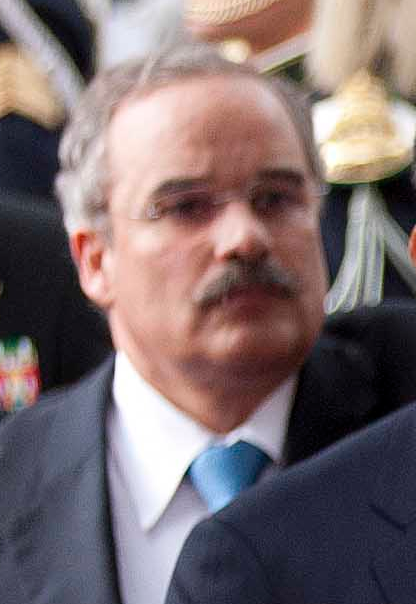

Chief of Protocol of Portugal
- In office 27 October 2008 – 31 March 2012
- Preceded by: Manuel Corte-Real
- Succeeded by: António de Almeida Lima

Portuguese Ambassador to the Netherlands
- In office 14 March 2012 – 20 September 2016
- President: Aníbal Cavaco Silva; Marcelo Rebelo de Sousa
- Preceded by: Jorge Silva Lopes
- Succeeded by: Rosa Batoréu

Portuguese Ambassador to Denmark
- In office 24 November 2004 – 10 October 2008
- President: Jorge Sampaio; Aníbal Cavaco Silva
- Preceded by: José Freitas Ferraz
- Succeeded by: João Silveira Carvalho

Personal details
- Born: José de Bouza Serrano; 20 July 1950 (age 76) Lisbon, Portugal
- Education: University of Lisbon

José de Bouza Serrano GCIH OIH GCM (born 20 July 1950) is a Portuguese diplomat.

He earned a licentiate degree in Law from the University of Lisbon, and joined the diplomatic career in 1978. He served as the Portuguese Ambassador in Copenhagen (Denmark) from 2004 to 2008, as the (non-resident) Portuguese Ambassador in Vilnius (Lithuania) in 2005, as the country's Chief of Protocol from 2008 to 2012, and as the Portuguese Ambassador in The Hague (Netherlands) from 2012 to 2016.

In 2019, Bouza Serrano sold his 170-piece collection of 17th-to-19th-century Ming and Qing Chinese porcelain to the Orient Foundation; the collection is now on permanent exhibition at the Museum of the Orient, in Lisbon, under the name "The Former Bouza Serrano Collection – The Strength of Fragile Things".

An outspoken monarchist (self-described as a "committed monarchist in the service of the Republic"), in 2023 he was in charge of protocol at the wedding of Infanta Maria Francisca, Duchess of Coimbra in Mafra Basilica.

== Published works ==
- O Livro do Protocolo (A Esfera dos Livros, Lisbon, 2011)
- As Famílias Reais dos Nossos Dias: o olhar de um diplomata português (A Esfera dos Livros, Lisbon, 2018)
- A Viúva de Windsor: histórias da História do longo reinado de Isabel II (Oficina do Livro, 2022)
- O Rei Sem-Abrigo: Don Juan Carlos I de Espanha (Oficina do Livro, 2024)

== Distinctions ==
=== National orders ===
- Grand Cross of the Order of Prince Henry (26 March 2012)
- Officer of the Order of Prince Henry (22 April 1989)
- Grand Cross of the Order of Merit (30 December 2004)
