= State Protocol and Ceremonials of Ukraine =

Diplomatic protocol

State Protocol and Ceremonials
- Служба державного протоколу та церемоніалу
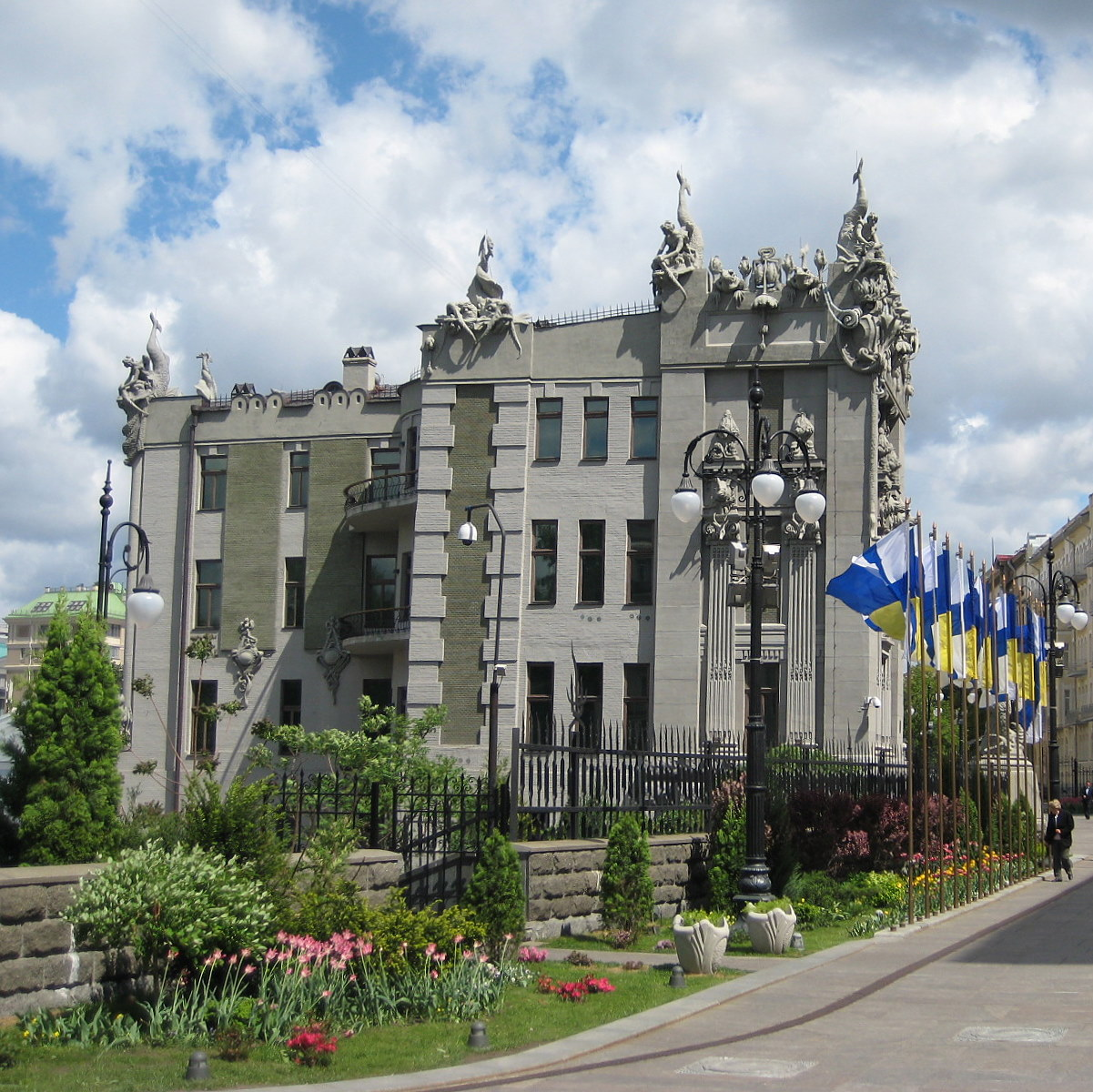

Agency overview
- Formed: November 4, 2020
- Preceding agency: Department for State Protocol and Ceremonies
- Jurisdiction: Ukraine
- Headquarters: 10, Bankova Street, Kyiv, 01220, Ukraine
- Deputy Head of the Office of the President of Ukraine responsible: Ihor Brusylo
- Agency executive: Ruslan Kurochenko, Director
- Parent agency: Office of the President of Ukraine

The State Protocol and Ceremonials Service is a standalone entity in the Office of the President of Ukraine.

The former unit in the Office of the President of Ukraine (until November 4, 2020) was known as the Department for State Protocol and Ceremonies.

== Status ==
The State Protocol and Ceremonials Service draws up and submits proposals as regards planning and holding protocol, ceremonial and other events of the president of Ukraine, foreign visits and working trips of the head of state within Ukraine. The service is responsible for arranging and coordinating visits to Ukraine of heads of foreign states, governments, international organizations and other foreign dignitaries who arrive in Ukraine at the invitation of the president of Ukraine.

The service ensures observance of protocol rules, norms, customs and traditions when other protocol services conduct events in Ukraine on central, regional and local levels and provides professional assistance and advice if opportune.

== Mission and objectives ==
The State Protocol and Ceremonials works to form favorable conditions for reaching substantive results as an outcome of bilateral and multilateral engagements at the highest level. Another mission is to represent Ukrainian historic legacy and cultural heritage by diplomatic means of intercultural exchange to ensure mutual understanding between countries and peoples.

== Senior management ==
The director of state protocol and ceremonials is appointed and dismissed by the chief of staff of the Office of the President of Ukraine. Yaroslav Melnyk held the position from September 10, 2014, until September 21, 2020.

Senior management consists of director, first deputy director and deputy director.

State Protocol and Ceremonials of Ukraine is made up of:

- Division for International Engagements
- Division of State Ceremonials
- Division of National Events and Official Correspondence

As of November 2021 Ruslan Kurochenko is a director of state protocol and ceremonials service. Coordination is exercised by deputy head of the Office of the President of Ukraine Ihor Brusylo.

== Location ==
The State Protocol and Ceremonials of Ukraine is located in a unique architectural landmark "House with Chimaeras" (Mansion of Architect Władysław Horodecki in 10, Bankova Street). This is the State Residence to host international official and other ceremonies of the president of Ukraine (meetings, receptions, ceremonies, negotiations, presentation of credentials, press conferences etc.).

The Hall of Credentials, Hall for Signing Ceremonies, small conference room, grand conference room, dining room, grand dining room, guest room, private room decorated in light blue shades with Chinese motives also known as "Chinese" room and “Tet-a-Tet” room are some of the premises in the Horodetski Mansion.

== Gallery ==
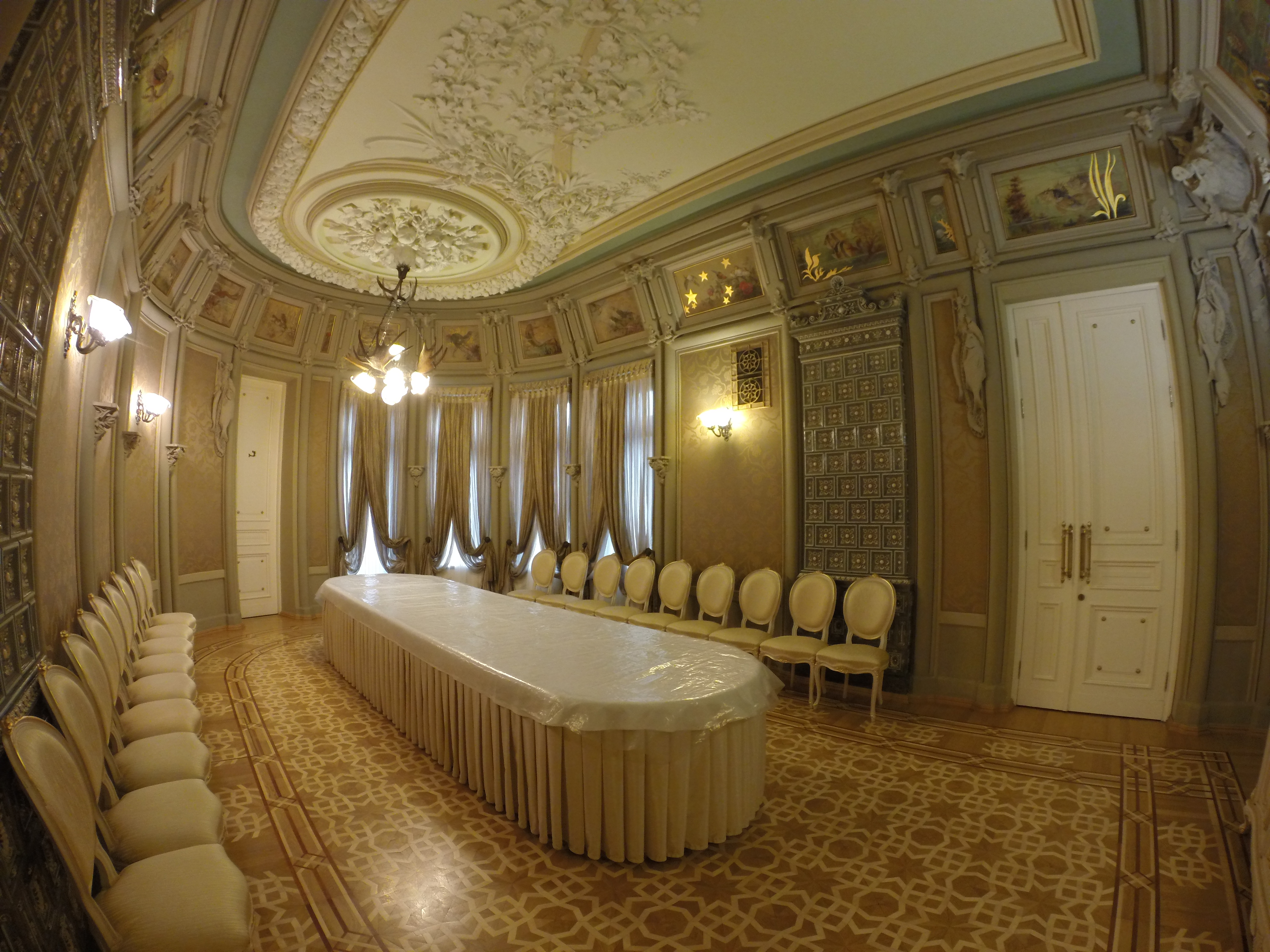
Dining room

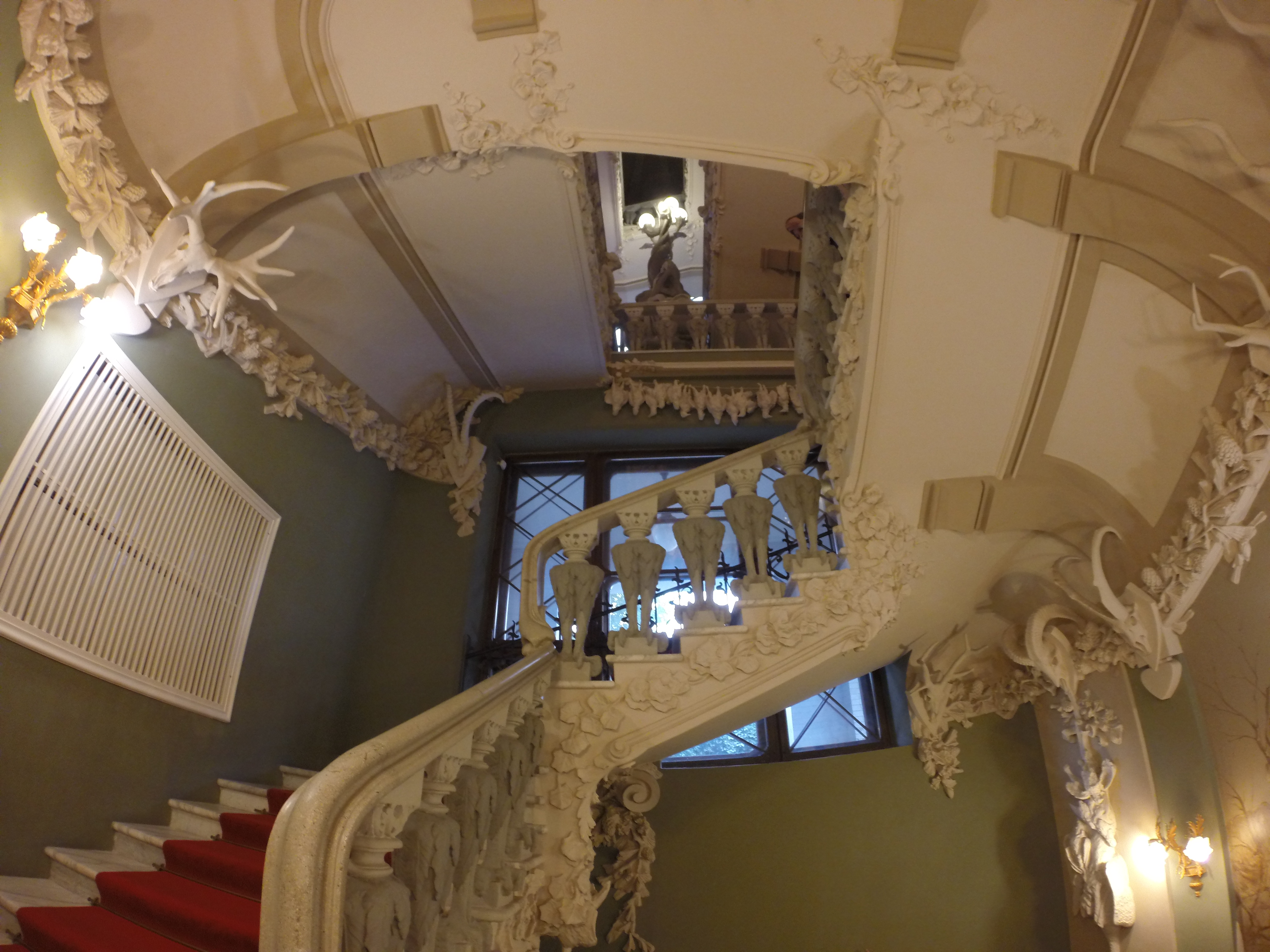
Stucco molding on the central stairs

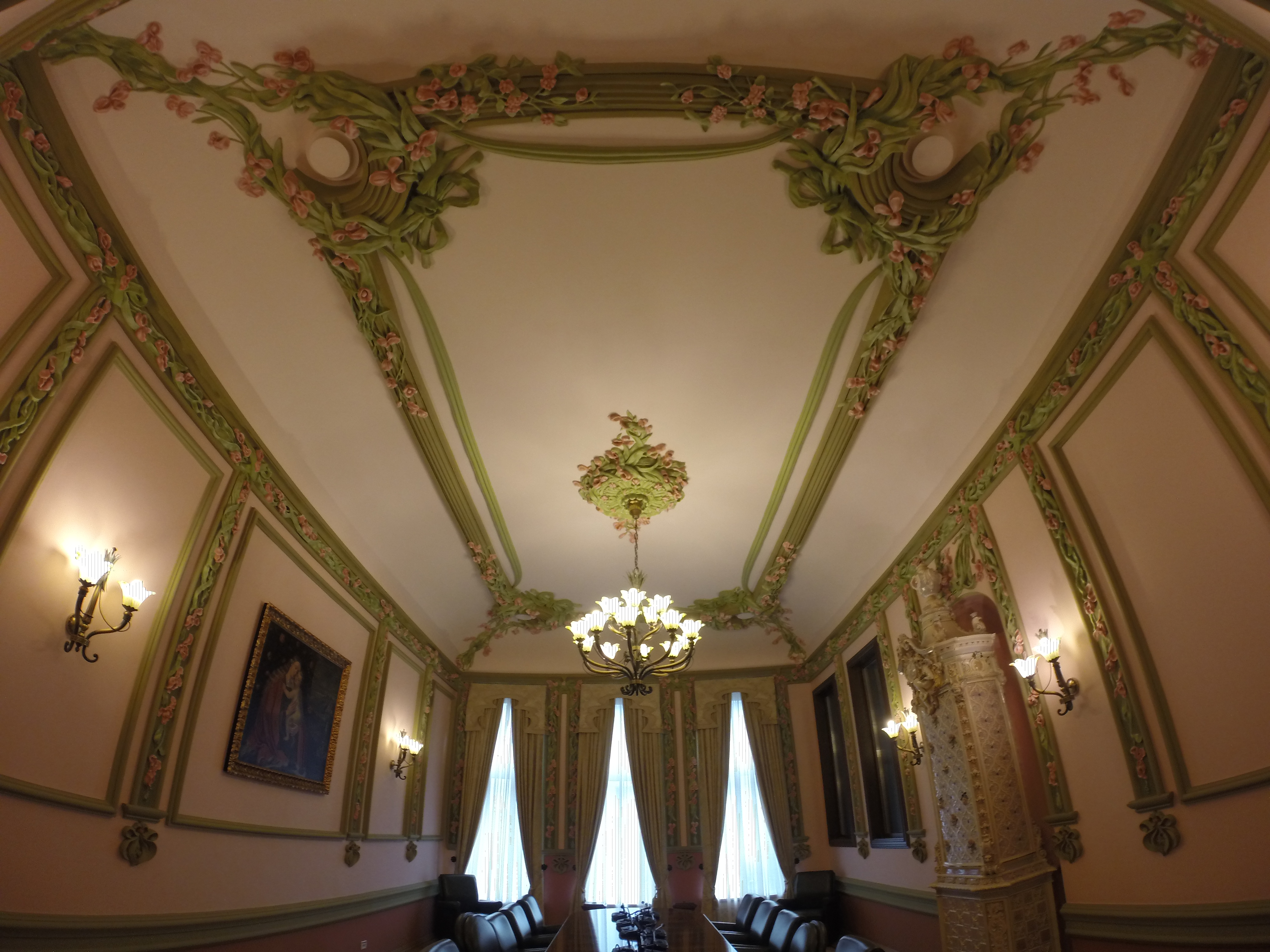
Small conference room

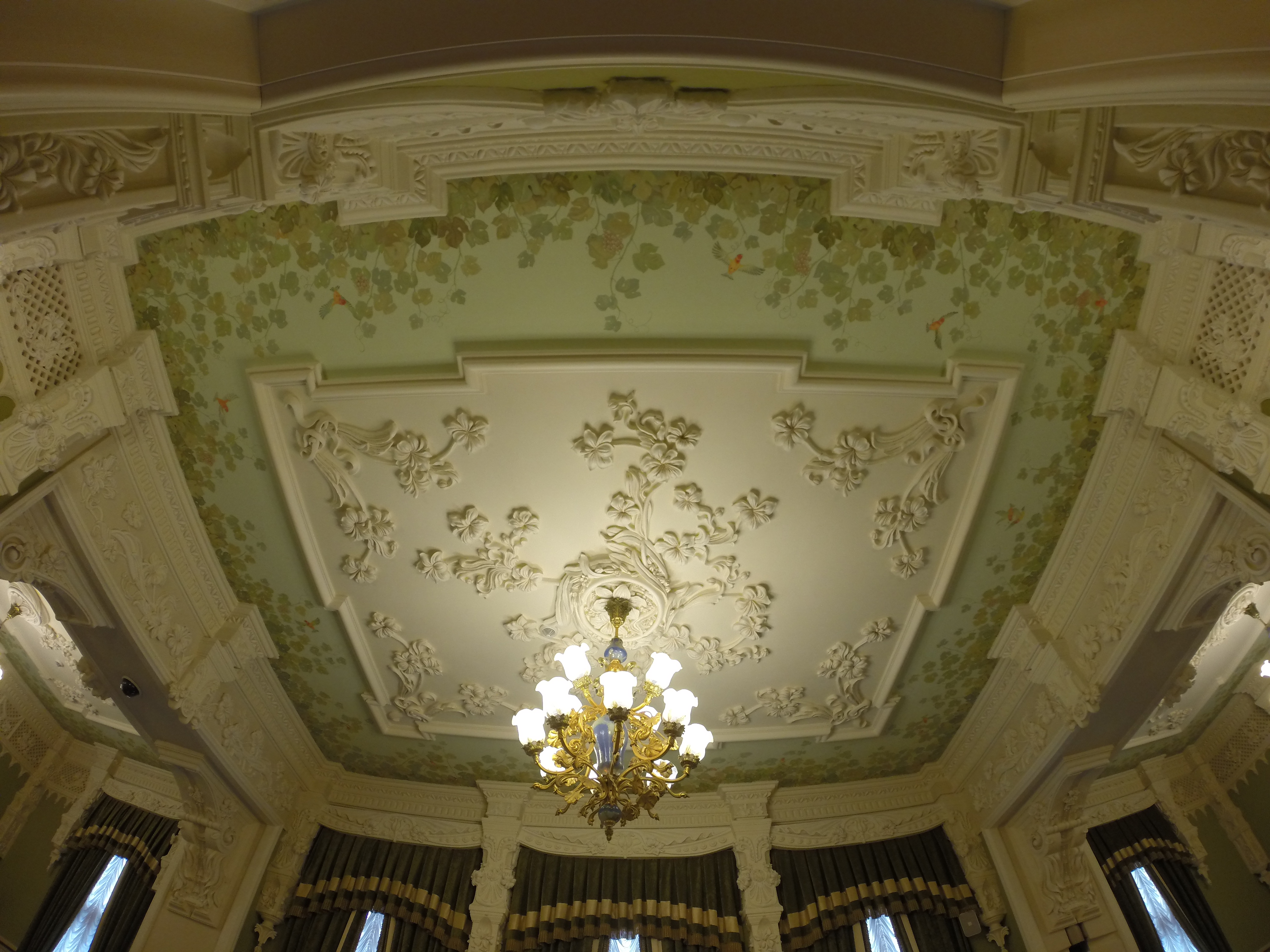
Interior design

== See also ==
- Office of the President of Ukraine
- Protocol (diplomacy)
