= Chief of protocol =

Government official

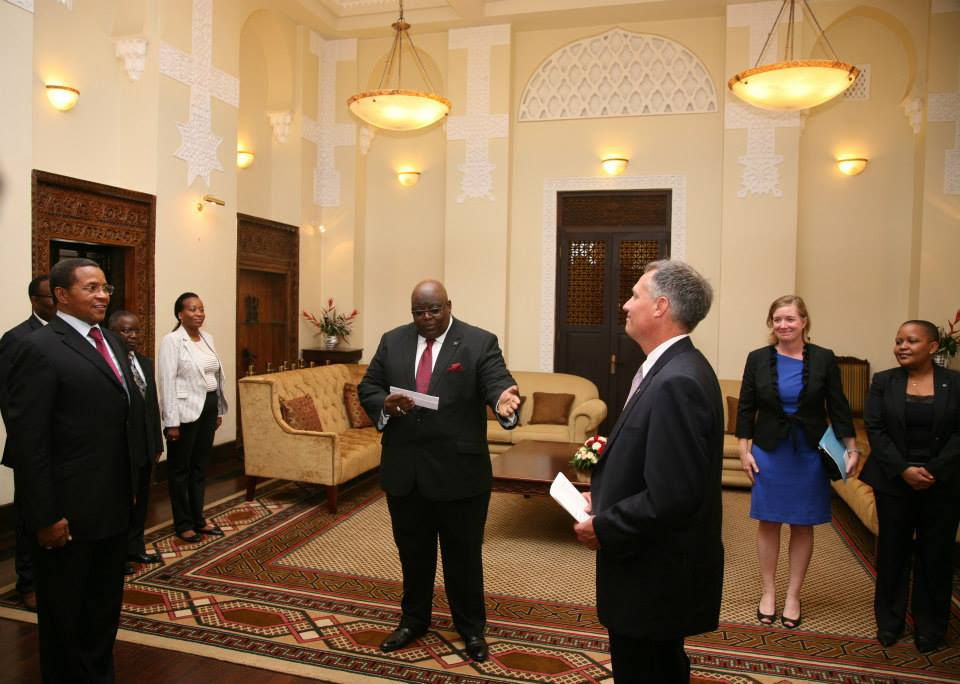
The Chief of Protocol (center) is also responsible to introduce new Ambassadors assigned to his country to the head of state

The chief of protocol (CoP) is a government official who heads the protocol department of a state, overseeing security, logistics and etiquette in diplomatic and national functions. A protocol department decides on diplomatic immunity and privileges, diplomatic host security, diplomatic use of airspace and it is the guardian of official etiquette. Advance protocol teams, usually headed by the chief of protocol, engage as first contact between governments for the planning of bilateral and multilateral summits and visits.

Countries with a chief of protocol include:

- Chief of Protocol of the United States, an official at the U.S. State Department who welcomes visiting dignitaries to the U.S. and travels with the President to facilitate foreign trips.
- Introducer of Ambassadors, a senior diplomat in Spain who presents new ambassadors to the Monarch and is also chief of protocol of the Ministry of Foreign Affairs.
- Chief of Protocol of Canada, the head of the Office of Protocol at Global Affairs Canada. The chief is the most senior protocol officer for high-level international visits to Canada and outgoing state, official and working visits, as well as overall issues relating to entitlements and special status granted to foreign diplomats in Canada. As of 2026, the Chief of Protocol is Sébastien Carrière.
- Chief of Protocol of Fiji, an official at the Foreign Ministry who advises on issues related to protocol and deals with diplomatic missions and regional and international organizations. The official also administers accreditation of all diplomats in Fiji and other matters related to diplomacy and protocol.
- Chief of Protocol of Bhutan (Dronyer), an official at the Foreign Affairs Ministry who receives and facilitates the visits of state guests and coordinates visits by guests from foreign missions and agencies.
- Chief of Protocol of Japan, an official at the Foreign Affairs Ministry.
- Chief of Protocol of Sri Lanka, the head of the Protocol Division at the Ministry of Foreign Affairs. The division is responsible for all matters related to diplomatic relations, such as affording courtesies, privileges and immunities to diplomatic missions and international organizations. It also facilitates logistical and protocol arrangements for visiting dignitaries and foreign trips by the president, prime minister, and foreign minister. It further issues visas for foreign diplomats.
- Chief of Protocol of Kenya, the head of the Protocol Directorate at the Foreign Affairs Ministry. The directorate coordinates protocol matters for efficient diplomatic engagement.
- Chief of Protocol of Germany, the head of Protocol at the Federal Foreign Office. The chief holds ambassadorial rank. The protocol office facilitates visits by foreign guests and foreign trips by the president, chancellor, and foreign minister. The office is split up in five divisions, each of which have different tasks.
- Chief of Protocol of Eswatini
- Chief of Protocol of Denmark
- Deputy Minister for Protocol Affairs of South Korea
- Chief of Protocol of Malawi
- Chief of Protocol of Nepal
- Director of Protocol Affairs of Indonesia. He assists the Director-General for Protocol and Consular Affairs from the Foreign Ministry which by ex-officio serves as the State's Chief of Protocol (Indonesian: Kepala Protokol Negara shortened KPN).
- Chief of Protocol of Iraq
- Chief of Protocol of Israel
- Chief of Protocol of Uganda, also known as the Marshall of Diplomatic Corps
- State Protocol and Ceremonials of Ukraine.
- Chief of State Protocol of South Africa
- First Officer of the Royal Protocol of Saudi Arabia
- Chief of Diplomatic Protocol of Suriname, the head of the Diplomatic Protocol Division at the Ministry of Foreign Affairs, International Business and International Cooperation. The division is responsible for all matters related to diplomatic relations, such as affording courtesies, privileges and immunities to diplomatic missions and international organizations. It also facilitates logistical and protocol arrangements for visiting dignitaries and foreign trips by the president, vice president and ministers. It further issues visas for foreign diplomats.
