= Mamboundou =

Mamboundou is a Gabonese surname. Notable people with the surname include:

- Pierre Mamboundou (1946–2011), Gabonese politician
- Sébastien Mamboundou Mouyama (fl. 2009), Gabonese politician
