= Sébastien Mamboundou Mouyama =

Gabonese politician

Sébastien Mamboundou Mouyama is a Gabonese politician. He is the current National Secretary of Free Trade under the ruling Gabonese Democratic Party (Parti démocratique gabonais) (PDG).
