= Elections in Gabon =

Elections in Gabon take place within the framework of a presidential multi-party democracy with the Democratic Union of Builders as the dominant party. The president and National Assembly are directly elected, whilst the Senate is indirectly elected.

== Latest elections ==
=== President ===
Provisional results released on 13 April showed that Oligui had won 90.35% of the vote while Bilie by Nze won 3.02%, with the remainder going to six other candidates. Turnout was estimated at 70.4%.

On 18 April, Interior and Security Minister Herman Immongo held a press briefing to correct "errors" in the previously announced election results. After a full centralization of the protocols, the results showed Oligui receiving 94.85% of the votes. The corrected results were submitted to the Constitutional Court, which certified them on 25 April.

Candidate	Party	Votes	%
Brice Oligui Nguema	Independent (Rally of Builders)	588,074	94.85
Alain Claude Bilie By Nze	Ensemble pour le Gabon	19,265	3.11
Joseph Lapensée Essigone	Independent	3,744	0.60
Gninga Chaning Zenaba	Independent	2,419	0.39
Alain Simplice Gombré	Gabonese Patriotic Party	2,299	0.37
Stéphane Germain Iloko	Large Rassemblement Arc-en-ciel	2,214	0.36
Axel Stophène Ibinga Ibinga	Independent	1,384	0.22
Thierry Yvon Michel N'Goma	Independent	601	0.10
Total		620,000	100.00
Valid votes		620,000	96.48
Invalid/blank votes		22,632	3.52
Total votes		642,632	100.00
Registered voters/turnout		916,625	70.11
Source: CC

=== National Assembly ===
Preliminary results released by the interior ministry indicated the Democratic Union of Builders was in the lead, followed far behind by the Gabonese Democratic Party of the Bongo regime. A second round of voting was ordered for 11 October in 77 constituencies where a candidate did not obtain a majority.

In the constituencies of Ntoum 1st Arrondissement and Douigny 1st elections were held on 18 October with a second round on 2 November. Elections were cancelled in the constituencies of Lékoni-Lékori 1st, Ndougou 2nd and Ntem 2nd.

Party	First round			Second round			Total seats
Party	Votes	%	Seats	Votes	%	Seats	Total seats
Democratic Union of Builders	163,410	43.68	51	84,032	51.39	50	101
Gabonese Democratic Party	63,867	17.07	5	35,849	21.92	12	17
Rally for the Fatherland and Modernity	20,072	5.37	1	7,161	4.38	2	3
National Union	14,833	3.96	0	9,259	5.66	2	2
Union for the Republic	10,724	2.87	1	2,474	1.51	0	1
Gabonese Democratic Party–Democratic Union of Builders	7,665	2.05	4			0	4
Gabonese Social Democrats	6,108	1.63	0	3,253	1.99	2	2
Democratic Socialist Front	4,736	1.27	0	697	0.43	1	1
Patriotic Alliance	4,641	1.24	0			0	0
The Democrats	4,170	1.11	0			0	0
Together for Gabon	2,911	0.78	0	160	0.10	0	0
Social Democratic Party	2,519	0.67	1			0	1
Concerted National Coordination for Development	2,507	0.67	0			0	0
Party for Development and Social Solidarity	1,655	0.44	0			0	0
Circle of Liberal Reformers	1,581	0.42	0	189	0.12	0	0
Gabonese Patriotic Front	1,577	0.42	0			0	0
Rally for the New Republic	1,609	0.43	0	743	0.45	1	1
National Party for Work and Progress	1,372	0.37	0			0	0
Union for Democracy and Social Integration	1,217	0.33	0			0	0
Rally for Gabon	1,200	0.32	0			0	0
Party for the Seven Wonders of the Gabonese People	1,031	0.28	0			0	0
Union of the Gabonese People	995	0.27	0			0	0
Rally of Gabonese Awakening for Action, Restoration and Development	866	0.23	0			0	0
Democratic and Republican Alliance	715	0.19	0			0	0
Gabonese Patriotic Party	634	0.17	0			0	0
Progressive Socialist Union	632	0.17	0			0	0
Rally for Gabon–UN–LD–GDC	574	0.15	0			0	0
Citizen Movement of Freedom Volunteers	536	0.14	0	773	0.47	0	0
Heritage and Modernity Rally	484	0.13	0	509	0.31	0	0
The Democrats–Rally for Gabon	444	0.12	0			0	0
Gabonese Socialist Party	437	0.12	0			0	0
Christian Democratic Bloc	434	0.12	0	286	0.17	1	1
Independent Centre Party of Gabon	414	0.11	0			0	0
Union of the Gabonese People–Gabonese Progress Party	412	0.11	0			0	0
Unitary Republican Dynamic	343	0.09	0			0	0
Citizen Awakening Party	343	0.09	0			0	0
Gabonese Socialist Union	328	0.09	0			0	0
Rally for Democracy and Progress	300	0.08	0			0	0
Congress for Democracy and Justice	266	0.07	0			0	0
Large Rainbow Rally	265	0.07	0			0	0
Association for Socialism in Gabon	237	0.06	0			0	0
Civic Conscience and Action	211	0.06	0			0	0
National Party for Work and Progress–PGP	205	0.05	0			0	0
Forum for the Defense of the Republic	190	0.05	0			0	0
Popular Movement of the Gabonese Youth	160	0.04	0			0	0
Union of Forces for Change	137	0.04	0			0	0
Bloc of United Patriots	125	0.03	0			0	0
Gabonese Democratic Renewal Party	124	0.03	0			0	0
Union for the New Republic	115	0.03	0			0	0
Rally for Gabon–Christian Democratic Bloc–UN–LD	93	0.02	0			0	0
Sovereigntists–Ecologists Party	88	0.02	0			0	0
Movement for National Rectification	82	0.02	0			0	0
Gabonese Progress Party	66	0.02	0			0	0
ADERE–Gabonese Patriotic Party–Gabonese Patriotic Front–UPNR	32	0.01	0			0	0
Independents	43,424	11.61	0	18,132	11.09	8	8
Vacant			2			1	3
Total	374,116	100.00	65	163,517	100.00	80	145
Valid votes	374,223	92.30		163,415	96.76		
Invalid/blank votes	31,228	7.70		5,469	3.24		
Total votes	405,451	100.00		168,884	100.00		
Registered voters/turnout	922,365	43.96		588,216	28.71		
Source: CNOCER (Note: The number of valid votes reported to be cast was 107 higher than the total number of votes reported to be cast for individual candidates in the first round and 102 lower in the second round.)

== Electoral history ==
=== Pre-independence ===
Following World War II, Gabon (in a combined constituency with French Congo, began to elect members to the French National Assembly. The first elections took place in October 1945, with voters split into two colleges; the First College for French citizens and the Second for non-citizens. Gabriel d'Arboussier was elected by the First College, and although Gabonese politician Jean-Hilaire Aubame received the most votes in the Second College, the election went to a second round, where he was beaten by the Congolese Jean-Félix Tchicaya. The next elections were held in June the following year, with d'Arboussier defeated by Henri Seignon in the First College and Tchicaya re-elected in the Second. Another election was held in November that year, with the Second College gaining an extra seat, and now split into Congolese and Gabonese sections. Maurice Bayrou was elected by the still-combined First College, whilst Aubame was elected in the Gabonese Second College seat on a French Section of the Workers' International ticket.

A third election in 1946 took place in December when the Representative Assembly was elected; it also used a college system, with 12 members elected by the First College and 18 by the Second. The next French elections took place in 1951, with Bayrou re-elected in the First College and Aubame in the Second. The Representative Council was converted into a Territorial Assembly prior to the 1952 elections, with Aubame's Gabonese Democratic and Social Union (UDSG) winning 14 of the 24 seats. Bayrou and Aubame were both re-elected again in the 1956 French elections.

The final national elections in the colonial period were the Territorial Assembly elections of 1957. Although the UDSG emerged as the largest party, winning 14 of the 40 seats, the Gabonese Democratic Bloc (BDG), which had won eight seats, was able to form a 21-seat coalition together with an affiliated list and five independents. This resulted in the BDG's Léon M'ba becoming prime minister, and president when the country became independent in 1960.

=== Post-independence ===
Following independence, the president became a directly elected post, with the National Assembly elected every three years and the president every six. In the first post-independence elections in 1961 both posts were elected simultaneously, and the BDG and UDSG agreed to run on a single united list under the name "National Union". No other party ran and the list won all 67 seats in the National Assembly, whilst M'ba ran unopposed for the presidency, and was elected with 100% of the vote. However, the two parties ran against each other in the 1964 parliamentary elections, with the BDG winning 31 seats to the UDSG's 16. The BDG was the only party to contest the 1967 general elections, resulting in M'ba being re-elected unopposed and the party winning all 47 seats in the National Assembly.

The following year the country became a one-party state with the Gabonese Democratic Party (PDG, the successor to the BDG) as the sole legal party. General elections were held in 1969, with Omar Bongo (who had succeeded M'ba after his death in 1967) elected unopposed as President and the PDG list winning all 70 seats in the National Assembly. Presidential elections in 1979 and 1986 saw Bongo re-elected in the same manner, whilst the PDG remained unopposed in parliamentary elections in 1980 (in which the National Assembly was increased to 89 seats) and 1985 (111 seats).

Multi-party politics was reintroduced in 1990 and parliamentary elections that year saw the PDG retain its majority in the National Assembly, although it was reduced to 63 of the 120 seats. The first competitive presidential elections were held in 1993, with Bongo re-elected with 51% of the vote, although the runner-up, Paul Mba Abessole, accused the government of vote rigging. The PDG won the 1996 parliamentary elections, winning 85 seats. The Senate was elected for the first time in early 1997, with the PDG winning 52 of the 91 seats. Bongo was re-elected again in 1998 with 67% of the vote, and the PDG gained another seat in the 2001 parliamentary elections. The February 2003 Senate elections saw the PDG win 67 of the 92 seats. Bongo was re-elected for a sixth time in the 2005 presidential elections with 79% of the vote.

The PDG was reduced to 82 seats in the 2006 parliamentary elections, although affiliated parties won a further 17 seats. Senate elections in early 2009 saw the PDG win 75 of the 102 seats in an expanded Senate. Following Bongo's death in June 2009, presidential elections were held later in the year, and won by his son Ali Bongo Ondimba, who received 42% of the vote. The 2011 parliamentary elections were boycotted by most opposition parties, resulting in the PDG winning 115 of the 121 seats. The PDG retained its majority in the Senate in the 2014 elections, winning 81 seats.

The 2016 presidential elections were the closest in the country's history, with Bongo Ondimba re-elected with 49.8% of the vote, around six thousand votes ahead of Jean Ping of the Union of Forces for Change amid various irregularities favouring Bongo. The PDG won the 2018 parliamentary elections but lost 15 seats. Presidential and parliamentary elections were held simultaneously as part of general elections in 2023, but after Bongo was declared winner of the presidential elections, a coup took place that removed him from power. A referendum in 2024 approved a new constitution, with general elections scheduled for the next year.

Gabon held its first post-coup presidential election on 12 April 2025. Brice Oligui Nguema, the transitional leader who had ousted President Ali Bongo and ended over five decades of dynastic rule, secured a landslide victory with approximately 90% of the vote. The election, contested by eight candidates including former prime minister Alain Claude Bilie-By-Nze, saw a voter turnout of 70.4%; a significant increase from the disputed 2023 vote. Nguema, who campaigned on promises of reform, economic diversification, and restoring dignity to the Gabonese people, was granted a renewable seven-year mandate amid concerns over the continuity of Bongo-era power structures. Despite widespread poverty and high youth unemployment, the election marked a critical moment in Gabon’s post-coup political transition.

== Electoral system ==
The voting age in Gabon is 18, and voting is compulsory; non-participants may be fined.

=== President ===
The president of Gabon is elected for a seven-year term in a single round of voting by plurality.

=== National Assembly ===
The 120 members of the National Assembly are elected from nine multi-member constituencies based on the provinces using the two-round system. Constituencies are between nine and eighteen seats in size.

=== Senate ===
The 102 members of the Senate are indirectly elected. Like the National Assembly, they are elected from nine multi-member constituencies based on the provinces, with between four and eighteen seats in each constituency. The elections are carried out by municipal councillors and departmental assembly members using the two-round system. Substitute members are elected at the same time.

== Referendums ==
During the colonial era, Gabonese voters participated in French constitutional referendums in 1945, May 1946 and October 1946. In the 1958 referendum on establishing the French Community, 93% of voters voted in favour; a no vote would have resulted in immediate independence. Since independence in 1960, only one referendum has been held; a constitutional referendum in 1995, which saw amendments to the constitution approved by 96.5% of voters.
