= History of Gabon =

Simplified map of Gabon

Present-day Gabon was first inhabited by rainforest hunter-gatherers (often called Pygmy peoples), attested as early as c. 43,000 BC; archaeology confirms occupations from the Late Pleistocene to the Neolithic along the coast and in the Ogooué. By c. 400–300 BC, Bantu-speaking farming and ironworking communities settled in the middle Ogooué, initiating an expansion that subsequently structured settlement across the region.

From 1472 Atlantic contact reshaped coastal exchange. Myene-speaking polities on the Gabon littoral, including the Mpongwe in the Estuary and the Orungu and Nkomi farther south, acted as brokers linking river routes to European shipping. Trade focused on ivory, copper, salt, raffia cloth, and, by the late 1700s, captives; in 1788 about 500 people were embarked annually at " Gabon and Cape Lopez ", far fewer than the major outlets farther south. Domestic slavery predated overseas commerce and expanded with it, concentrating wealth and authority in lineages and chiefly houses. Coastal lifeways combined salt making, oyster harvesting at Mayumba, and diversified agriculture, while political organization ranged from clan-based councils among the Mpongwe to royal offices among the Orungu and Nkomi.

In 1862–1887 France expanded its control including the interior of the state, and took full sovereignty. In 1910 Gabon became part of French Equatorial Africa and in 1960, Gabon became independent.

At the time of Gabon's independence, two principal political parties existed: the Gabonese Democratic Bloc (BDG), led by Léon M'Ba, and the Gabonese Democratic and Social Union (UDSG), led by Jean-Hilaire Aubame. In the first post-independence election, held under a parliamentary system, neither party was able to win a majority; the leaders subsequently agreed against a two-party system and ran with a single list of candidates. In the February 1961 election, held under the new presidential system, M'Ba became president and Aubame became foreign minister. The single-party solution disintegrated in 1963, and there was a single-day bloodless coup in 1964. In March 1967, Leon M'Ba and Omar Bongo were elected president and vice president. M'Ba died later that year. Bongo declared Gabon a one-party state, dissolved the BDG and established the Gabonese Democratic Party (PDG). Sweeping political reforms in 1990 led to a new constitution, and the PDG garnered a large majority in the country's first multi-party elections in 30 years. Despite discontent from opposition parties, Bongo remained president until his death in 2009.

== Early history ==
=== Archaeology ===
Late Stone Age, Neolithic, and Early/Late Iron Age sequences are documented in the Lope–Okanda–Ogooue region and on the coast.

- Coastal Neolithic at Owendo (Libreville): lithics, pottery, shells, hearths dated to 5040 ± 130 BP.
- Lopé II (middle Ogooue): charcoal from Late Stone Age layers dates to 10320 ± 110 BP, 9170 ± 100 BP, and 6760 ± 120 BP; a much later pit with ceramics dates to 2370 ± 35 BP and 2210 ± 45 BP, indicating reoccupation by pottery-using groups long after the earlier occupations.
- Ceramic traditions and early ironworking:
  - Yindo pottery (Note: Yindo pottery is a ceramic tradition defined for the Lopé–Okanda region of central Gabon. Diagnostic vessels are small bowls and pots with flat bases and beveled, often fluted rims) attested at Okanda I, Lope II, Toube I, Maboue I, Okanda V; highest date at Okanda I 3560 ± 75 BP.
  - After about AD 650, the earlier pit features disappear. Later radiocarbon dates indicate renewed occupations at several sites: Lope XV (AD 1046–1293), Lope V (AD 1215–1414), Otoumbi III (AD 1398–1442), and Lope X (AD 1623–1808).
- Ritual evidence (late precolonial): the Iroungou burial cave near Mouila yielded at least 28 individuals and 512 grave goods (iron currency hoes, bracelets, gongs, long spatulate rods), with radiocarbon placing use in the 14th–15th centuries AD.

=== Precontact period ===
Rainforest hunter-gatherers (often called Pygmy groups, including the Babongo, Baka, and Bakoya) are the earliest known inhabitants of the area, their presence has been attested since the Upper Pleistocene (roughly 43,000–13,000 BC). Archaeology in the Ogooue valley shows Late Stone Age sites long before farming, and genetics points to deep splits between foragers and farmers. Bantu-speaking communities appear by the Early Iron Age, at least the 3rd–2nd centuries BC, and expand through the first millennium AD.

The Bantu expansion is found in the middle Ogooue valley, where Late Stone Age occupations were replaced by Early Iron Age communities around 2400–2300 BP (c. 400–300 BC), notably at Lalara and Otoumbi. Paleoenvironmental studies identify a late Holocene episode of rainforest fragmentation around 2500–2000 BP (c. 550–50 BC) across Central Africa, including Gabon, which created savanna–forest mosaics conducive to such settlements. This timing and geography are consistent with broader models of Bantu expansion that emphasize movement along habitat corridors and slower spread through dense rainforest.

Early Iron Age metallurgy in Gabon is documented by smelting furnaces and slag at sites such as Oveng (Estuaire Province), confirming local iron production and its role in the west-Central African spread of Bantu speakers. Prior to coastal contact, lineage-based communities and flexible chiefly authority embedded in riverine exchange networks structured social and political life in equatorial Africa, a framework widely applied to precolonial Gabon, especially along the Ogooue corridor.

== Precolonial period ==
Portuguese navigators reached the Gabon estuary in 1472 and applied the name "Gabon" from the Portuguese gabão, a hooded cloak likened to the shape of the Komo River estuary. The Portuguese settled on São Tomé, Príncipe and Fernando Pó, and were regular visitors to the coast.

Along the southern littoral, exchange fell within the orbit of the Kingdom of Loango, whose Vili merchants controlled access to ports and markets and set tolls and prices; raffia cloth functioned as currency and a source of power. Trade moved through African brokers and canoe routes linking lagoons, estuaries and inland paths; ivory, copper, salt, and raffia cloth circulated long before the Atlantic slave trade, which was later integrated into these circuits.

During the 17th and 18th centuries, Dutch, English and French competition eroded any early Portuguese advantage; Loango, the Kakongo and Ngoyo remained autonomous polities, and Europeans depended on African middlemen for supplies and captives drawn from interior zones such as the Mayombe. Farther north toward the estuary, with the Myene-speaking groups, intermediaries linked the Ogooué river routes and the lagoon chain to European shipping without sustained European territorial control.

=== Tribes and societies in the precolonial period ===
Coastal Myene-speaking groups—Mpongwe in the Gabon Estuary, Orungu around Cape Lopez, and Nkomi at Fernan Vaz—developed as middleman polities tied to Atlantic trade from the 16th to the mid-19th century, with the slave trade peaking c. late 18th–early 19th century and declining after French settlement in 1843; Orungu and Nkomi retained more centralized structures, while the Mpongwe shifted toward dispersed clan-based authority. The later 19th-century arrival of Fang groups on the coast further disrupted this balance.

These coastal brokers organized a commercial "domain" extending inland through allied or subordinate peoples: Adyumba (Mpongwe near Lake Azingo), Galoa, Enenga, Eshira, and Okande, with nearer neighbors such as Seke and Akele supplying forest products and more distant communities supplying captives. Profits concentrated on ivory and high-prestige imports, while firearms, powder, and ironware were routed inland.

Social classification combined status by birth with wealth from commerce. Among the Mpongwe, categories distinguished free-born lineages, foreigners admitted to reside, and slaves (including house-born), with marriage rules channeling women upward socially but restricting movement downward. In economic terms, the key index of rank was control of dependants—slaves and wives—who provided plantation labor, portage, and domestic production. Female status varied by age, order of marriage, and husband's wealth; a women's society (nzembe) provided solidarity and protection and is associated with Eshira influence.

Politically, the Mpongwe of the Estuary evolved from an 18th-century kingdom into a multipolar system of clans. Each clan was led by an aga with senior notables, and councils of elders exercised collective decision-making with religious and judicial roles. By contrast, the Orungu and the Nkomi maintained royal offices (ompolo) chosen by councils of elders, within a hierarchical structure from families to lineages to clans to the tribe. A coastal vs. interior division mapped onto "sea" clans controlling maritime trade and "land" clans managing hinterland affairs; at Cape Lopez the Abulia/Alombe were sea clans and the Apandji a land clan, while at Fernan Vaz an interior abunjé group is noted. Notable Orungu rulers in the late 18th to mid-19th century concentrated power at Sangatanga and pursued warfare to secure commercial advantages, notably under Renwombi-Mpolo and then Rogombé-Mpolo/Pass-all, with an apogee around 1810–1850. Contemporary Nkomi rulers fought the Orungu and developed Anyambie as a parallel coastal hub.

=== Slavery and domestic servitude ===
Domestic slavery predated the Atlantic trade among coastal groups and eased its implantation; the export trade in turn broadened and intensified the reasons for enslavement, including warfare, debts and judicial sanctions. Observers in the early 19th century reported a very large extension of domestic slavery in the Estuary.

Household slaves generally lived and worked permanently on agricultural "habitations" located away from villages, produced staple foods, transported provisions to the coast, and carried merchandise toward the interior. Along the coast, slaves also functioned as a recognized unit of account: fines and bridewealth were stipulated in slaves, even when payment was made in equivalent commodities such as ivory, ebony or redwood. A spatial gradient is noted for the region: the farther from the coast, the fewer domestic slaves were found and the more frequent were convoys of slaves destined for export.

Social rank correlated with control over dependants—slaves and wives—which indexed wealth and political standing among coastal brokers. Funerary practices could include the sacrifice of slaves to accompany notable men in death, a custom attested by contemporary testimonies. Social order was also maintained through ritualized fear and coercion, including exemplary executions.

Overall, preexisting domestic slavery facilitated the Atlantic trade, and the trade fed back by multiplying motives for enslavement and tightening dependence in the coastal economy.

Overall, coastal acculturation to Atlantic trade was deepest among the Mpongwe and more limited among Orungu and Nkomi, shaping divergent capacities to absorb the post-1830 transition from slave exports to other commodities.

=== Coastal lifeways (17th–19th centuries) ===
Salt-making formed a notable littoral industry—especially from north of the Kwilu to Chilongo (Republic of Congo) and around the lagoons—using clay or termite-mound stoves to evaporate seawater, with output packed in cylindrical baskets for inland trade; local salt was often preferred to imported varieties. At Mayumba, seasonal oyster harvesting from the Banya lagoon floor supplemented livelihoods, while coastal agriculture included maize and cassava (both introduced by the 17th century), groundnuts, bananas, sweet potatoes, yams and sugar cane; palms supplied wine and oil.

=== Southern coast and the Loango trading sphere (16th–19th centuries) ===
From Cape Lopez down to the mouth of the Congo River, navigation and exchange were shaped by a chain of lagoons and bays, notably Fernan Vaz/Nkomi, Setté Cama, Iguela/Ngove east of Cape St. Catherine, the Banya lagoon at Mayumba, and Cayo at Pointe-Noire (Republic of the Congo). The coastal surf and bars forced most ships to anchor offshore, while the mangrove-backed littoral north of Mayumba contrasted with higher, drier shores farther south.

Seventeenth-century accounts place the effective northern reach of Loango's authority around Ngove/Ngobe at Cape St. Catherine. The Ngobe generally sent ivory to Mayumba and Loangiri (Republic of the Congo) rather than trade directly with Europeans. In the Setté district, ivory and redwood moved largely through Mayumba, where Loango's representative levied an approximate 10% tax on redwood. Mayumba sat at the north end of the roughly 50-mile Banya lagoon; oysters collected in the dry season provided key subsistence, while ivory was the principal export. Tradition held that Mayumba had submitted to Loango after a Chilongo (Republic of the Congo) conquest.

In the 18th century Setté supplied redwood and ivory, while Mayumba remained a regional outlet for these products. Canoe links allowed communication from Setté to the Ogooué to the north and to Mayumba to the south, reinforcing Mayumba's redistributive role.

At Cape Lopez, Dutch reports describe a ruler at Olibatta, a few miles inland, presiding over a town of roughly 200 houses and acting independently of the Maloango—evidence of plural authority north of Loango.

Nineteenth-century testimonies indicate steady flows between Mayumba and the interior: salt, firearms and cloth ascended the Ogooué, Passa and Alima toward Kuyu and Likuala (Republic of the Congo) in exchange for ivory and captives. The Adouma canoe specialists on the middle–upper Ogooué went no farther upstream than the Nkoni, beyond this, European goods declined in value because communities traded westward to Mayumba.

=== Slave trade (17th–mid-19th centuries) ===
In 1788, the English trader Norris estimated only about 500 captives sold annually at "Gabon and Cape Lopez" , versus roughly 13,500 combined for Loango Bay (Republic of Congo), Malemba (Republic of Congo) and Cabinda (Angola), underscoring the smaller scale of the Gabon outlets. Main suppliers north of the Nyanga River were the Punu and Vunu, mediating between coastal Nkomi, Ngobe, Lumbu, Vili of Mayumba and interior Nzabi, Tshogo, Sangu and Pove; salt was essential, with European goods increasingly important.

By the 1830s–1840s, suppression patrols reshaped tactics. Most captives taken south of Fernan Vaz or at Setté Cama were marched to Mayumba, then a town of about 1,000, where seven or eight barracoons typically held 500–600 people awaiting embarkation.

== French colonial period ==
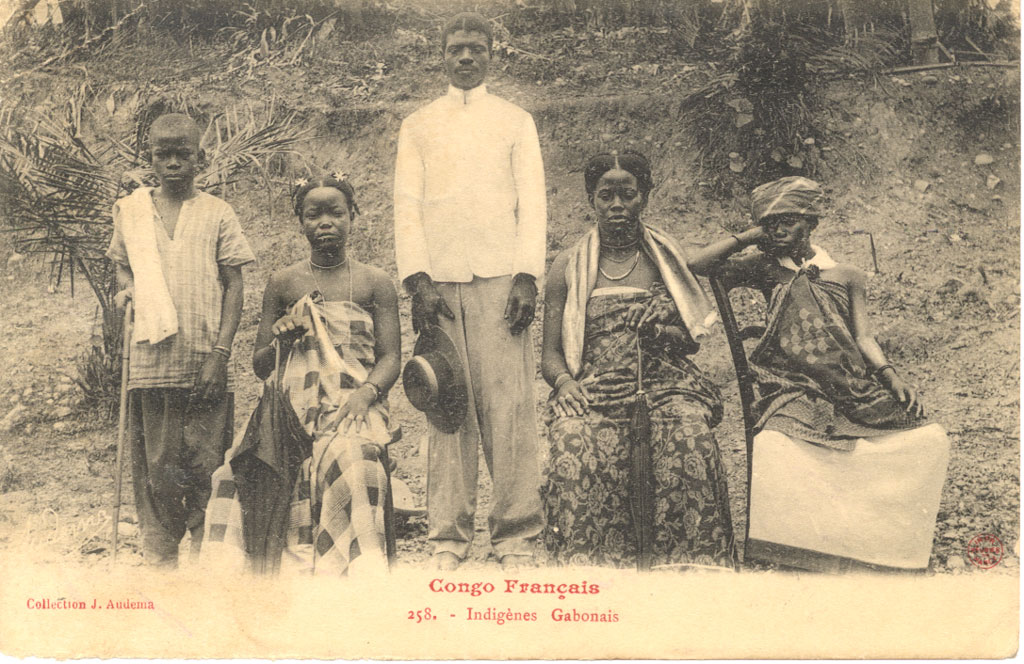
right"French Congo. Natives from Gabon": Colonial postcard c.1905

In 1838 and 1841, France established a protectorate over the coastal regions of Gabon by treaties with Gabonese coastal chiefs.

American missionaries from New England established a mission at the mouth of the Komo River in 1842. In 1849, the French authorities captured an illegal slave ship and freed the captives on board. The captives were released near the mission station, where they founded a settlement which was called Libreville (French for "free town")

French explorers penetrated Gabon's dense jungles between 1862 and 1887. The most famous, Pierre Savorgnan de Brazza, used Gabonese bearers and guides in his search for the headwaters of the Congo River. France occupied Gabon in 1885, but did not administer it until 1903. Gabon's first political party, the Jeunesse Gabonais, was founded around 1922.

In 1910 Gabon became one of the four territories of French Equatorial Africa. On 15 July 1960 France agreed to Gabon becoming fully independent. On 17 August 1960 Gabon became an independent country.

== Independence ==
At the time of Gabon's independence in 1960, two principal political parties existed: the Gabonese Democratic Bloc (BDG), led by Léon M'Ba, and the Gabonese Democratic and Social Union (UDSG), led by Jean-Hilaire Aubame. In the first post-independence election, held under a parliamentary system, neither party was able to win a majority. The BDG obtained support from three of the four independent legislative deputies, and M'Ba was named Prime Minister. Soon after concluding that Gabon had an insufficient number of people for a two-party system, the two party leaders agreed on a single list of candidates. In the February 1961 election, held under the new presidential system, M'Ba became president and Aubame became foreign minister.

This one-party system appeared to work until February 1963, when the larger BDG element forced the UDSG members to choose between a merger of the parties or resignation. The UDSG cabinet ministers resigned, and M'Ba called an election for February 1964 and a reduced number of National Assembly deputies (from 67 to 47). The UDSG failed to muster a list of candidates able to meet the requirements of the electoral decrees. When the BDG appeared likely to win the election by default, the Gabonese military toppled M'Ba in a bloodless coup on 18 February 1964. French troops re-established his government the next day. Elections were held in April 1964 with many opposition participants. BDG-supported candidates won 31 seats and the opposition 16. Late in 1966, the constitution was revised to provide for automatic succession of the vice president should the president die in office. In March 1967, Leon M'Ba and Omar Bongo (then known as Albert Bongo) were elected President and Vice President, with the BDG winning all 47 seats in the National Assembly. M'Ba died later that year, and Omar Bongo became president.

In March 1968 Bongo declared Gabon a one-party state by dissolving the BDG and establishing a new party: the Gabonese Democratic Party (Parti Démocratique Gabonais) (PDG). He invited all Gabonese, regardless of previous political affiliation, to participate. Bongo was elected President in February 1973; in April 1975, the office of vice president was abolished and replaced by the office of prime minister, who had no right to automatic succession. Bongo was re-elected president in December 1979 and November 1986 to 7-year terms. Using the PDG as a tool to submerge the regional and tribal rivalries that divided Gabonese politics in the past, Bongo sought to forge a single national movement in support of the government's development policies.

Economic discontent and a desire for political liberalization provoked violent demonstrations and strikes by students and workers in early 1990. In response to worker grievances, Bongo negotiated on a sector-by-sector basis, making significant wage concessions. In addition, he promised to open up the PDG and to organize a national political conference in March–April 1990 to discuss Gabon's future political system. The PDG and 74 political organizations attended the conference. Participants essentially divided into two loose coalitions, the ruling PDG and its allies, and the United Front of Opposition Associations and Parties, consisting of the breakaway Morena Fundamental and the Gabonese Progress Party.

The April 1990 conference approved sweeping political reforms, including creation of a national Senate, decentralization of the budgetary process, freedom of assembly and press, and cancellation of the exit visa requirement. In an attempt to guide the political system's transformation to multiparty democracy, Bongo resigned as PDG chairman and created a transitional government headed by a new Prime Minister, Casimir Oyé-Mba. The Gabonese Social Democratic Grouping (RSDG), as the resulting government was called, was smaller than the previous government and included representatives from several opposition parties in its cabinet. The RSDG drafted a provisional constitution in May 1990 that provided a basic bill of rights and an independent judiciary but retained strong executive powers for the president. After further review by a constitutional committee and the National Assembly, this document came into force in March 1991. Under the 1991 constitution, in the event of the president's death, the Prime Minister, the National Assembly president, and the defence minister were to share power until a new election could be held.

Opposition to the PDG continued, however, and in September 1990, two coup d'état attempts were uncovered and aborted. Despite anti-government demonstrations after the untimely death of an opposition leader, the first multiparty National Assembly elections in almost 30 years took place in September–October 1990, with the PDG garnering a large majority.

Following President Bongo's re-election in December 1993 with 51% of the vote, opposition candidates refused to validate the election results. Serious civil disturbances led to an agreement between the government and opposition factions to work toward a political settlement. These talks led to the Paris Accords in November 1994, under which several opposition figures were included in a government of national unity, and constitutional reforms were approved in a referendum in 1995. This arrangement soon broke down, however, and the 1996 and 1997 legislative and municipal elections provided the background for renewed partisan politics. The PDG won a landslide victory in the legislative election, but several major cities, including Libreville, elected opposition mayors during the 1997 local election.

== Modern times ==
President Bongo coasted to easy re-elections in December 1998 and November 2005, with large majorities of the vote against a divided opposition. While Bongo's major opponents rejected the outcome as fraudulent, some international observers characterized the results as representative despite any perceived irregularities. Legislative elections held in 2001–2002, which were boycotted by a number of smaller opposition parties and were widely criticized for their administrative weaknesses, produced a National Assembly almost completely dominated by the PDG and allied independents.

Omar Bongo died at a Spanish hospital on 8 June 2009.

His son Ali Bongo Ondimba was elected president in the August 2009 presidential election. He was re-elected in August 2016, in elections marred by numerous irregularities, arrests, human rights violations and post-election violence.

On 24 October 2018, Ali Bongo Ondimbao was hospitalized in Riyadh for an undisclosed illness. On 29 November 2018 Bongo was transferred to a military hospital in Rabat to continue recovery. On 9 December 2018 it was reported by Gabon's Vice President Moussavou that Bongo suffered a stroke in Riyadh and has since left the hospital in Rabat and is currently recovering at a private residence in Rabat. Since 24 October 2018 Bongo has not been seen in public and due to lack of evidence that he is either alive or dead many have speculated if he is truly alive or not. On 1 January 2019 Bongo gave his first public address via a video posted to social media since falling ill in October 2018 putting to rest any rumours he was dead.

On 7 January 2019, soldiers in Gabon launched an unsuccessful coup d’etat attempt.

On 11 May 2021, a Commonwealth delegation visited Gabon as Ali Bongo visited London to meet with the secretary general of the organization, which brings together 54 English-speaking countries. President Bongo expressed Gabon's willingness to join the Commonwealth. In June 2022, Gabon joined the Commonwealth as its 55th member.

In August 2023, following the announcement that Ali Bongo had won a third term in the general election, military officers announced that they had taken power in a coup d'état and cancelled the election results. They also dissolved state institutions including the Judiciary, Parliament and the constitutional assembly. On 31 August 2023, army officers who seized power, ending the Bongo family's 55-year hold on power, named Gen Brice Oligui Nguema as the country's transitional leader. On 4 September 2023, General Nguema was sworn in as interim president of Gabon. In April 2025, Brice Oligui Nguema won presidential election with more than 90% of the vote, becoming the 4th President of Gabon.

== See also ==
- History of Africa
- List of heads of government of Gabon
- List of heads of state of Gabon
- Libreville history and timeline

== Bibliography ==
- Chamberlin, Christopher. "The migration of the Fang into Central Gabon during the nineteenth century: a new interpretation." International Journal of African Historical Studies 11.3 (1978): 429–456. online
- Cinnamon, John M. "Missionary expertise, social science, and the uses of ethnographic knowledge in colonial Gabon." History in Africa 33 (2006): 413–432. online
- Digombe, Lazare, et al. "The development of an Early Iron Age prehistory in Gabon." Current Anthropology 29.1 (1988): 179–184.
- Gray, Christopher. "Who Does Historical Research in Gabon? Obstacles to the Development of a Scholarly Tradition1." History in Africa 21 (1994): 413–433.
- Gray, Christopher John. Colonial rule and crisis in Equatorial Africa: Southern Gabon, c. 1850–1940 (University Rochester Press, 2002). online
- Gray, Christopher J. "Cultivating citizenship through xenophobia in Gabon, 1960–1995." Africa today 45.3/4 (1998): 389–409 online
- M'Bokolo, Elikia (1977). "Le Gabon précolonial: étude sociale et économique". Cahiers d'études africaines. 17 (66–67): 331–344. doi:10.3406/cea.1977.2457.
- Matsuura, Naoki. "Historical changes in land use and interethnic relations of the Babongo in southern Gabon." African Study Monographs 32.4 (2011): 157–176. online
- Ngolet, François. "Ideological manipulations and political longevity: the power of Omar Bongo in Gabon since 1967." African Studies Review 43.2 (2000): 55–71. online
- Nnang Ndong, Léon Modeste (2011). L'Effort de Guerre de l'Afrique: Le Gabon dans la Deuxième Guerre Mondiale, 1939–1947. Paris: L'Harmattan. ISBN 9782296553903.
- Patterson, K. David (1975). The Northern Gabon Coast to 1875. Oxford: Clarendon Press. ISBN 978-0-19-821696-4.
- Martin, Phyllis M. (1972). The External Trade of the Loango Coast, 1576-1870: The Effects of Changing Commercial Relations on the Vili Kingdom of Loango. Oxford: Clarendon Press.
- Rich, Jeremy (2007). A Workman Is Worthy of His Meat: Food and Colonialism in the Gabon Estuary. Lincoln: University of Nebraska Press. ISBN 978-0-8032-0741-7.
- Vansina, Jan (1990). Paths in the Rainforests: Toward a History of Political Tradition in Equatorial Africa. Madison: University of Wisconsin Press. ISBN 978-0-299-12574-5.
- Yates, Douglas A. Historical dictionary of Gabon (Rowman & Littlefield, 2017) online
- Yates, Douglas. "The dynastic republic of Gabon." Cahiers d’études africaines (2019): 483–513. online
- Yates, Douglas A. "The History of Gabon." Oxford Research Encyclopedia of African History (2020).
