= Prime Minister of Gabon =

Head of government

Prime Minister of the Gabonese Republic
- Premier ministre de la République gabonaise (French)
- Coat of arms of Gabon
- Longest serving Léon Mébiame; 16 April 1975—3 May 1990
- Type: Head of government
- Status: Abolished
- Appointer: President of Gabon
- Formation: 17 August 1960 (Note: The office of Prime Minister existed while the autonomous Gabonese Republic was part of the French Union/French Community (21 May 1957 – 17 August 1960).)
- First holder: Léon M'ba; Casimir Oyé-Mba (Third Republic; since 1991)
- Final holder: Raymond Ndong Sima
- Abolished: 4 May 2025
- Website: www.primature.gouv.ga

The prime minister of Gabon (French: Premier ministre de la République gabonaise) was the head of government of Gabon.

The position was first created in 1960, upon the country's independence from France, but was soon abolished by a new constitution adopted on 21 February 1961. It was, however, restored by constitutional amendments enacted on 16 April 1975 and was also retained in the subsequent constitution adopted in 1991. The prime minister has been the head of government of Gabon from 1960 until 1961 (under a parliamentary system) and since 1981 (under a strong semi-presidential system). The President of Gabon was the country's head of government from 1961 until 1981 (until 1975 under a presidential system without a prime minister and then under a presidential system with a prime minister).

A total of thirteen people have served as Prime Minister, twelve men and one woman.

The role of Prime Minister as the Gabonese head of government was abolished due to the approval of a new constitution in a November 2024 referendum, following a transition period until the president elected in April 2025 was sworn in on 3 May 2025. Its duties were largely succeeded by a new role, the Vice President of the Government, while the Vice President of the Republic continues as the deputy to the President and is first in the line of succession. The first appointee of this new role was Alexandre Barro Chambrier.

== Description of the office ==
The President of the Republic nominates the Prime Minister.

The President may terminate the prime minister's post, of his initiative or by the prime minister's presentation of their resignation from the Government, or following a vote of disapproval or the adoption of a motion of censure by the National Assembly.

By proposal, the prime minister may nominate other members of the Government and terminate their posts.

The prime minister may stand in for the President by express authorization and for a determined agenda.

Within forty-five (45) days, after the nomination and deliberation of the Council of Ministers, the prime minister will present before the National Assembly their general policy program that will lead to an open debate, followed by a vote of confidence. The vote is obtained by an absolute majority of the members of the National Assembly.

The prime minister directs the actions of the Government. The prime minister assures the execution of the laws. According to the conditions of Article 20 mentioned above, the Prime Minister exercises regulatory power and nominates civil and military posts of the State. The Prime Minister stands in for the President of the Republic in the aforementioned situations. The prime minister may delegate certain powers to other members of the Government.

A replacement for the prime minister is assured by a member of the Government designated by a decree of the President of the Republic, according to the order of nomination of the decree that arranged the composition of the Government.

The Minister taking over the duties of the Prime Minister in the interim is temporarily invested with the full rights and powers of the position.

The actions of the prime minister are to be countersigned by the members of the Government charged with their execution.

The Prime Minister is the Chief of Government.

== List of officeholders ==
Political parties

Gabonese Democratic Bloc (BDG) → Gabonese Democratic Party (PDG)

Other factions

Independent

Status

Denotes acting or transitional prime minister

No.	Portrait	Name (Birth–Death)	Term of office			Political party	Elected	Cabinet(s)	President(s)	Ref.
No.	Portrait	Name (Birth–Death)	Took office	Left office	Time in office	Political party	Elected	Cabinet(s)	President(s)	Ref.
1		Léon M'ba (1902–1967)	17 August 1960	21 February 1961	188 days	BDG	—	M'ba	Himself	
1		Léon M'ba (1902–1967)	17 August 1960	21 February 1961	188 days	BDG	1961	M'ba	Himself	
Post abolished (21 February 1961 – 16 April 1975)
2		Léon Mébiame (1934–2015) (Note: From 1961 to 1981 the President of Gabon was both head of state and head of government, while the Prime Minister only assisted him in managing government affairs.)	16 April 1975	3 May 1990	15 years, 17 days	PDG	—	Mébiame	O. Bongo	
2		Léon Mébiame (1934–2015)	16 April 1975	3 May 1990	15 years, 17 days	PDG	1980	Mébiame	O. Bongo	
2		Léon Mébiame (1934–2015)	16 April 1975	3 May 1990	15 years, 17 days	PDG	1985	Mébiame	O. Bongo	
3		Casimir Oyé-Mba (1942–2021)	3 May 1990	2 November 1994	4 years, 183 days	PDG	—	Oyé-Mba	O. Bongo	
3		Casimir Oyé-Mba (1942–2021)	3 May 1990	2 November 1994	4 years, 183 days	PDG	1990	Oyé-Mba	O. Bongo	
4		Paulin Obame-Nguema (1934–2023)	2 November 1994	23 January 1999	4 years, 82 days	PDG	—	Obame-Nguema	O. Bongo	
4		Paulin Obame-Nguema (1934–2023)	2 November 1994	23 January 1999	4 years, 82 days	PDG	1996	Obame-Nguema	O. Bongo	
5		Jean-François Ntoutoume Emane (born 1939)	23 January 1999	20 January 2006	6 years, 362 days	PDG	—	Emane	O. Bongo	
5		Jean-François Ntoutoume Emane (born 1939)	23 January 1999	20 January 2006	6 years, 362 days	PDG	2001	Emane	O. Bongo	
6		Jean Eyeghé Ndong (born 1946)	20 January 2006	17 July 2009	3 years, 178 days	PDG	—	Ndong	O. Bongo	
6		Jean Eyeghé Ndong (born 1946)	20 January 2006	17 July 2009	3 years, 178 days	PDG	2006	Ndong	Divungi Di Ndinge	
6		Jean Eyeghé Ndong (born 1946)	20 January 2006	17 July 2009	3 years, 178 days	PDG	2006	Ndong	Rogombé	
7		Paul Biyoghé Mba (born 1953)	17 July 2009	27 February 2012	2 years, 225 days	PDG	—	Mba	Rogombé	
7		Paul Biyoghé Mba (born 1953)	17 July 2009	27 February 2012	2 years, 225 days	PDG	2011	Mba	A. Bongo	
8		Raymond Ndong Sima (born 1955)	27 February 2012	27 January 2014	1 year, 334 days	PDG	—	Sima I	A. Bongo	
9		Daniel Ona Ondo (born 1945)	27 January 2014	28 September 2016	2 years, 245 days	PDG	—	Ondo	A. Bongo	
10		Emmanuel Issoze-Ngondet (1961–2020)	28 September 2016	12 January 2019 (Note: Replaced in the aftermath of the 2019 coup attempt.)	2 years, 106 days	PDG	—	Issoze-Ngondet	A. Bongo	
10		Emmanuel Issoze-Ngondet (1961–2020)	28 September 2016	12 January 2019	2 years, 106 days	PDG	2018	Issoze-Ngondet	A. Bongo	
11		Julien Nkoghe Bekale (born 1958)	12 January 2019	16 July 2020	1 year, 186 days	PDG	—	Bekale	A. Bongo	
12		Rose Christiane Raponda (born 1963)	16 July 2020	9 January 2023	2 years, 177 days	PDG	—	Raponda	A. Bongo	
13		Alain Claude Bilie By Nze (born 1967)	9 January 2023	30 August 2023 (Deposed in a coup)	233 days	PDG	—	By Nze	A. Bongo	
Post vacant (30 August – 7 September 2023)
—		Raymond Ndong Sima (born 1955) acting	7 September 2023	4 May 2025	1 year, 239 days	Independent	—	Sima II	Oligui	
Post abolished (4 May 2025 – present)

== See also ==
- President of Gabon
  - First Lady of Gabon
- Vice President of Gabon
- List of colonial governors of Gabon
- Politics of Gabon
