= Charles Mve Ellah =

Gabonese politician

Charles Mve Ellah is a Gabonese politician. He was born on April 15 1966 in Libreville. He is the former Minister of Agriculture and Vice Minister of Water and Forests. He was also the National Secretary of Culture, the Arts, Sports and Leisure under the ruling Gabonese Democratic Party (Parti démocratique gabonais) (PDG).

He first entered the Gabonese government in 2020 during the COVID-19 crisis as Deputy minister of Water and Forests. He was then promoted to Minister of Agriculture where he notably lead activities with countries like Morocco or Egypt, and was present during conferences such as in Hanoi, Vietnam.
