= Stephanie Mouwandji Itsopault =

Gabonese politician

Stephanie Mouwandji Itsopault is a Gabonese politician. She is the current National Secretary of Social Affairs and Housing under the ruling Gabonese Democratic Party (Parti démocratique gabonais) (PDG).
