= Michel Akouloua =

Gabonese politician

Michel Akouloua is a Gabonese politician. He is a member of the Gabonese Democratic Party (Parti démocratique gabonais) (PDG), and is a Deputy of the National Assembly of Gabon.
