= Roger Mengue Mi Ekomie =

Gabonese politician and agronomist

Roger Mengue Mi Ekomie is a Gabonese politician and agronomist. He is the current National Secretary in charge of Agriculture, Animal Husbandry, and Rural Development of the ruling Gabonese Democratic Party (Parti démocratique gabonais, PDG).
