= Gabonese National Unity Party =

Political party in Gabon

The Gabonese National Unity Party (French: Parti de l'unité nationale gabonaise, PUNGA; Punga being the Eshira word for 'tornado') was a small Marxist political party based in Nyanga Province in Gabon. The party drew support from functionaries in the newly established public administration.

== History ==
The party was founded on 20 August 1958, and was led by René-Paul Sousatte and Jean-Jacques Boucavel, who had broken away from the Gabonese Democratic and Social Union two days earlier. The founders of PUNGA also included Louis M'Vey (of the CGAT trade union movement), Valentin Mihindou, Martin Longa (municipal councillor, BDG member), Henri Moundounga (in charge of the cabinet of the minister of Public Works) and Jean-Félix Lassy (in-charge of the cabinet of the minister of Public Functions). Sousatte served as the chairman of the party, Boucavel as vice chairman, Mihindou as secretary and Marcel Sandoungou as joint secretary.

PUNGA advocated immediate independence from French colonial rule, and called for a 'no' vote in the September 1958 referendum, which would have resulted in independence. At the time PUNGA, which was itself born in the midst of the preparations of the referendum, was the sole political force in the country that advocated this position. As an alternative to French domination, the party was open to the creation of a confederation of free and equal states. PUNGA had the backing of the Gabonese Action Movement, a Gabonese student organization in Metropolitan France.

Ultimately only 15,244 of the 190,334 voters voted 'No'. Following the referendum the influence of the party decreased.

In spite of the radical positions of the party, Sousatte turned against the French Communist Party. This development led to a split between him and M'Vey. In 1962 Sousatte was named Minister of Agriculture.
