= Viviane Biviga =

Gabonese politician

Viviane Biviga is a Gabonese politician. She was the National Secretary of Communications and Technology under the ruling Gabonese Democratic Party (Parti démocratique gabonais) (PDG) from 2012 until 2019.
