= Pierre Sockat =

Gabonese politician

Pierre Sockat is a Gabonese politician. He is the current national secretary of education under the ruling Gabonese Democratic Party (Parti démocratique gabonais) (PDG).
