= Simplice Guédet Manzela =

Gabonese politician (died 2020)

Simplice Guedet Manzela (died 9 April 2020) was a Gabonese politician. He was a member of the Gabonese Democratic Party (Parti démocratique gabonais, PDG), and was a deputy representing Ogooué-Lolo in the National Assembly of Gabon. He was Secretary-General of the PDG from 1994 until September 2008.

He supported the candidacy of Jean Ping in the Gabonese presidential elections of 2016.
