= Raphael Mangouala =

Gabonese politician

Raphael Mangoual

National Secretary

Personal details
- Party: Gabonese Democratic Party
- Occupation: Politician

Raphael Mangouala is a Gabonese politician. He is the current National Secretary in charge of Territorial Administration, Defense, Security, Immigration, and Foreign Affairs and Cooperation of the ruling Gabonese Democratic Party (Parti démocratique gabonais, PDG).
