= Martine Oulabou =

Gabonese teacher and activist

Martine Oulabou Mbadinga (1959 - March 23, 1992) was a Gabonese teacher and activist. Mbadinga's killing by police during a trade union march is credited with precipitating social reforms in Gabon.

== Background ==
In the late 1980s and early 1990s, Gabon was dealing with protest movements led by public unions. Among these was the Union of National Education Teachers (SENA), which called for better learning conditions for students and better working conditions for teachers. Violent strikes took place mainly in Libreville, from December 1990.

After the government of Gabon agreed to reforms, SENA stopped the strikes. However, in January 1991, SENA resumed the protests, saying that the government had reneged on their agreement.

== Biography ==
At the time of her death, Oulabou was 33 years old and taught a CE1 class at the Ecole Publique de la Sorbonne in Libreville. On Monday 23 March 1992, she took part in a peaceful protest organized by SENA. This protest was dispersed by the USI (Special Intervention Unit) police unit. According to a Minister of Communication publication, law enforcement used tear gas and rubber bullets.

At some point Oulabou was shot in the collarbone. She was transported to the private Chambrier clinic, then to the Fondation Jeanne Ebori hospital, where she died from her injuries.

She was buried in Ekouk, a village twenty kilometers from Libreville.

== Legacy ==
The SENA fought for the recognition of Oulabou's date of death as National Teacher's Day. It was declared an official holiday by President Omar Bongo in 2007.

The Ecole Publique Martine Oulabou, named after her, is located in Libreville.

Oulabou's passing was a catalyst for several reforms in Gabon. New measures for a more efficient school system were implemented, and most of the country's schools were built or renovated in the years that followed.
