= Gabonese Mixed Committee =

Political party in Gabon

The Gabonese Mixed Committee (French: Comité mixte gabonais, CMG) was a political party in Gabon.

== History ==
The CMG was established on 12 August 1946 by Léon M'ba, and was affiliated with the African Democratic Rally. In the 1952 Territorial Assembly elections it won two of the 24 elected seats.

In August 1953 the CMG merged with the Gabonese Democratic Party to form the Gabonese Democratic Bloc.
