= Jacques Adiahénot =

Gabonese politician

Jacques Adiahénot (born 11 May 1944) is a Gabonese politician. He was Secretary-General of the Gabonese Democratic Party (PDG) from 1991 to 1994 and subsequently served as a minister in the government of Gabon from 1994 to 2009.

== Political career ==
Adiahénot was born in Libreville and worked as Director of Presidential Press from 1970 to 1976 before going to Paris as the First Counsellor for Information at the Gabonese Embassy to France from 1976 to 1978. Subsequently he was Director-General of Channel 1 at Gabonese Television Broadcasting (RTG) from 1978 to 1989.

From 1989 to 1990, Adiahénot held a minor post in the government as Secretary of State at the Ministry of Public Works and Construction. That marked the beginning of a "meteoric rise in politics" for Adiahénot, who enjoyed the favor of President Omar Bongo. Strikes by students and workers in early 1990 pressured Bongo into holding a National Conference, with opposition participation, in March–April 1990. As a result of the National Conference, Bongo stepped down from the leadership of the ruling PDG and the existence of other political parties was legalized. Bongo's control of the PDG, which had been the only legal political party since its creation in 1968, had been a key feature of his rule up to that point. The party leadership was then turned over to Adiahénot, who served as Executive Political Secretary of the PDG from 1990 to 1991; subsequently he was Secretary-General of the PDG from 1991 to 1994.

Adiahénot was appointed to the government as Minister of State for Communication, Posts and Telecommunications on 25 March 1994. He was elected to the National Assembly in the December 1996 parliamentary election as a PDG candidate in Libreville; after the election, his ministerial portfolio was altered (and his rank reduced to that of an ordinary minister) on 28 January 1997, when he was appointed as Minister of Communication, Culture, Arts, and Popular Education.

On 25 January 1999, Adiahénot was appointed as Minister of State for Tourism, the Environment, and the Protection of Nature, but his portfolio and ministerial rank were quickly changed on 10 February 1999, when he was appointed as Minister of Housing, the Land-Survey Register, and Urban Affairs. In the December 2001 parliamentary election, he was again elected to the National Assembly as a PDG candidate in Libreville; after the election, he retained his post in the government. His ministerial portfolio was modified on 21 January 2006, when he was appointed as Minister of State for Housing, Urban Planning, and Topographical Work. In the December 2006 parliamentary election, he won the second seat from the Fourth Arrondissement of Libreville; subsequently his portfolio was modified on 25 January 2007, when he was appointed as Minister of State for Housing, Lodgings, and Urban Planning. He was then moved to the post of Minister of the Merchant Marine and Port Equipment (without the rank of Minister of State) on 29 December 2007.

=== Events since 2009 ===
President Bongo, who had "an almost paternal relationship" with Adiahénot, died in June 2009. Bongo's son, Ali Bongo, was then designated as the PDG candidate for the 30 August 2009 presidential election. Some leading PDG figures objected to Bongo's nomination and left the party; while Adiahénot did not quit the PDG, he also made no efforts to assist Bongo's presidential campaign. After Bongo won the election, Adiahénot was dismissed from the government on 17 October 2009. Having seen his influence within the PDG markedly reduced by Omar Bongo's death and Ali Bongo's election, Adiahénot then took up his seat in the National Assembly, representing the Fourth Arrondissement of Libreville.

Adiahénot, who had led the PDG through its most difficult period in the early 1990s, was reported to have quit the ruling party in March 2010. That purported decision was not considered surprising; Adiahénot was close to the various party "barons" who had left the PDG after Bongo's presidential nomination, and he "no longer seemed comfortable" in the PDG. He reportedly chose to delay his decision until the PDG's 10th Extraordinary Congress on 13–14 March 2010, hoping that the congress would facilitate reconciliation, but he was said to be disappointed by the outcome. Speculation immediately centered on the possibility that he would join the National Union, an opposition party dominated by former PDG "barons".

Although Adiahénot had not officially announced his departure from the PDG, the official Gabonese Press Agency (AGP) published a bitter denunciation of Adiahénot on 23 March. According to the AGP, Adiahénot was a manipulative politician who exploited Omar Bongo's generosity, "regularly using blackmail and other maneuvers". The AGP argued that his departure was predictable because he had already demonstrated disloyalty at the time of the 1993 presidential election and sympathized with the National Union. Scathingly, the AGP wrote that many PDG members in the Estuary Province "breathe a sigh of relief and rejoice not to suffer the dictates of a politician whose presence in the 4th arrondissement of the capital does not necessarily mean he enjoys indestructible popularity."

The reports of Adiahénot's resignation produced a brief period of confusion, as Adiahénot did not confirm that he was leaving the party. He then announced on 27 March, at celebrations marking the 42nd anniversary of the PDG's founding, that he was remaining a member of the PDG. Nevertheless, his future within the party was considered unclear, as he was no longer a member of the Political Bureau.

Four years later, in March 2014, Adiahénot held a press conference to announce his resignation from the PDG.
