= 1985 Gabonese parliamentary election =

Parliamentary elections were held in Gabon on 17 February and 3 March 1985. The country was a one-party state at the time, with the Gabonese Democratic Party as the sole legal party. The electoral system had been changed from the previous elections, with it now taking place in two stages; firstly a primary election where a candidate and deputy were elected in each constituency, followed by a nationwide ballot on the proposed candidates. The number of elected seats was increased from 89 to 111, with the addition of nine members appointed by the President, one from each province.

== Results ==
Party	Votes	%	Seats	+/–
Gabonese Democratic Party	767,674	100.00	111	+22
Appointed members			9	New
Total	767,674	100.00	120	+32
Valid votes	767,674	99.48		
Invalid/blank votes	3,977	0.52		
Total votes	771,651	100.00		
Registered voters/turnout	807,241	95.59		
Source: Inter-Parliamentary Union
