= Gabonese Democratic Party (1945) =

Political party in Gabon

The Gabonese Democratic Party (French: Parti démocratique gabonais, PDG) was a political party in Gabon.

== History ==
The party was established in 1945 by Emile Issembe and Paul Gondjout.

In August 1953 it merged with the Gabonese Mixed Committee (CMG) to form the Gabonese Democratic Bloc (BDG).
