= Circle for Renewal and Progress =

Political party in Gabon

The Circle for Renewal and Progress (French: Cercle pour le renouveau et le progrès, CRP) was a political party in Gabon.

== History ==
After the restoration of multi-party democracy, the party won one seat in the 1990 parliamentary elections. It retained its seat in the 1996 elections.
