= President of Gabon =

Head of state and government

President of the Gabonese Republic
- Président de la République gabonaise (French)
- Presidential standard

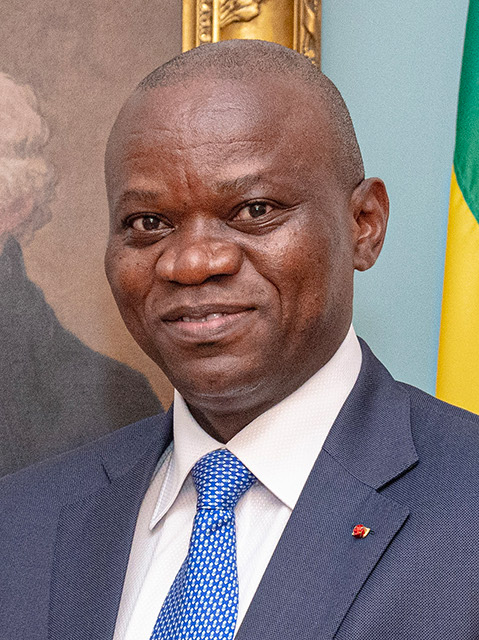
- Incumbent; Brice Oligui Nguema since 30 August 2023 (Note: As Chairman of the Committee for the Transition and Restoration of Institutions from 30 August 2023 until 2 May 2025 and as Transitional President de facto from 30 August 2023 and de jure from 4 September 2023 until 3 May 2025.)
- Executive branch of the Government of the Gabonese Republic
- Type: Head of state; Head of government; Commander-in-chief
- Residence: Presidential Palace, Libreville
- Term length: Seven years, renewable once
- Constituting instrument: Constitution of Gabon
- Formation: 12 February 1961; 65 years ago (Note: The office was already established in July 1958 as President of the Executive Council, while Gabon was part of the French Union/French Community. From 17 August 1960 until 12 February 1961 the Prime Minister was also the head of state.)
- First holder: Léon M'ba
- Deputy: Vice President of Gabon
- Salary: US$65,000 annually
- Website: presidence.ga

The president of Gabon (French: Président du Gabon) is the head of state and government of Gabon. A total of four people have served as president (not counting the collective head of state, one disputed president, three acting presidents and one transitional president) since the post was formed in 1960. Since 2025 the office of prime minister has been abolished, and now the president is the leader of the executive government and the commander-in-chief of the armed forces.

The current president, Brice Oligui Nguema, took power in a coup on 30 August 2023 from Ali Bongo. He was eventually elected to the presidency in the 2025 presidential election.

== Description of the office ==
=== Election ===
The president of the republic is elected for a presidential term of seven years, universal and direct suffrage, as per the 2024 Constitution. The president is eligible for re-election once, with a maximum of two consecutive terms, regardless of constitutional revisions. The 2024 Constitution reintroduced a two-term limit, replacing the unlimited re-election allowed under earlier amendments and explicitly prohibiting more than two successive mandates.

The election is conducted via a two-round majoritarian system. The candidate who obtains an absolute majority of votes expressed in the first round is elected. If no candidate achieves this, a second round is held 14 days after the proclamation of results, between the two candidates who received the most votes in the first round. The candidate with the most votes in the second round is elected. In case of withdrawal or permanent incapacity of one of the top two candidates, the next highest-ranking candidate from the first round replaces them.

Eligibility for the presidency is restricted to Gabonese citizens of either sex who:

- are born Gabonese to at least one Gabonese parent, themselves born Gabonese;
- hold exclusive Gabonese nationality (dual nationals must renounce other nationalities three years prior);
- are aged between 35 and 70 years;
- are married to a Gabonese spouse born to at least one Gabonese parent, themselves born Gabonese;
- have resided in Gabon continuously for at least three years before the election;
- can speak at least one national language;
- enjoy full civil and political rights;
- are certified to be in complete physical and mental well-being by a sworn medical panel designated by the bureaus of both parliamentary chambers.

The president’s spouse and descendants are ineligible to run for the presidency immediately following the president’s term. If a candidate dies or is incapacitated within the month before the first round, the Constitutional Court may postpone the election, but not beyond the incumbent president’s term end.

The Constitutional Court may extend election timelines, but the election must occur no later than the expiration of the incumbent president’s mandate. If the election is delayed beyond the current president’s term, the president remains in office until their successor is elected. The modalities for these provisions are set by organic law.

The presidential term begins on the day of the presidential oath, within eight working days after the Constitutional Court proclaimed the results, and ends after the seventh year. The election must take place no later than three months before the end of the incumbent president’s term. The incumbent president may not shorten their term to seek another mandate.

If the incumbent president runs for re-election, they cannot legislate by ordinance from the announcement of their candidacy until the election, and the National Assembly may not be dissolved. In cases of necessity, Parliament may convene in an extraordinary session.

=== Oath of office ===
The presidential oath marks the beginning of the presidential term and must occur after the Constitutional Court proclaims the official election results, within eight working days if no disputes arise, or within 15 days if contested. The president solemnly takes the following oath before the Constitutional Court and Parliament, with the left hand on the Constitution and the right hand raised before the national flag:

I, [name], elected President of the Republic, pledge before God, our Ancestors, and the Gabonese people to devote all my energies to their well-being, to protect them from all harm, to faithfully respect and defend the Constitution and the rule of law, to preserve democratic achievements, the independence of the homeland, the integrity of the national territory, and to conscientiously fulfill the duties of my office and be just to all. I so swear.

=== Vacancy ===
In case of a temporary incapacity of the president, as certified by the Constitutional Court upon referral by the presidents of both parliamentary chambers or the Vice-President of the Government, the Vice-President of the Republic temporarily assumes presidential duties, excluding certain powers (e.g., constitutional amendments, dissolution of the National Assembly, or referendum initiation). Temporary incapacity cannot exceed forty-five days, after which it becomes permanent. In case of a vacancy or permanent incapacity of the president, as certified by the Constitutional Court upon referral by the National Assembly bureau (by a two-thirds majority) or the Vice-President of the Government (after a simple majority vote in the Council of Ministers), the president of the Senate temporarily assumes presidential duties. If the Senate president is incapacitated, the first vice-president of the Senate takes over. The interim president exercises full presidential powers, except for specific powers (e.g., constitutional amendments or dissolution), and is ineligible to run in the subsequent presidential election. The interim president must take the following oath before the Constitutional Court and Parliament, with the left hand on the Constitution and the right hand raised before the national flag:

I swear to devote all my energies to the good of the Gabonese people, to ensure their well-being and protect them from all harm, to respect and defend the Constitution and the rule of law, to conscientiously fulfill the duties of my office, and to be just to all.

In cases of vacancy or permanent incapacity, the election for a new president must occur between 30 and 120 days after the vacancy or incapacity is declared, unless the Constitutional Court cites force majeure. The modalities are set by organic law.

== List of officeholders ==
Political parties

Gabonese Democratic Bloc (BDG) → Gabonese Democratic Party (PDG)
Gabonese Democratic and Social Union (UDSG)
Democratic and Republican Alliance (ADERE)
Democratic Union of Builders (UDB)

Other factions

Military

Status

Denotes acting or transitional president

Symbols

^{§} Elected unopposed

No.	Portrait	Name (Birth–Death)	Term of office			Political party	Elected	Cabinet(s)	Prime minister(s)	Ref.
No.	Portrait	Name (Birth–Death)	Took office	Left office	Time in office	Political party	Elected	Cabinet(s)	Prime minister(s)	Ref.
1		Léon M'ba (1902–1967) (Note: Briefly interrupted during the 17–18 February 1964 coup d'état.)	17 August 1960	28 November 1967 #	7 years, 103 days	BDG	—	—N/a	Himself (until 1961)	
1		Léon M'ba (1902–1967)	17 August 1960	28 November 1967 #	7 years, 103 days	BDG	1961^{[§]}		Post abolished (1961–1975)	
1		Léon M'ba (1902–1967)	17 August 1960	28 November 1967 #	7 years, 103 days	BDG	1967^{[§]}		Post abolished (1961–1975)	
—		Revolutionary Committee (Note: Members: Daniel Mbene, Jean-Valaire Essone, Jacques Mombo and Daniel Mbo Edou.) (In opposition to Léon M'ba)	17 February 1964	18 February 1964	1 day	Military	—		Post abolished (1961–1975)	
—		Jean-Hilaire Aubame (1912–1989) (Note: Head/Chief of the Provisional Government. Other members were: Philippe N'dong, editor of Gabon's literary review Réalités Gabonaises; Dr. Eloi Chambrier, Gabon's only physician; Philippe Mory, a famous Gabonese actor; and civil servant Paul Gondjout.) (In opposition to Léon M'ba)	18 February 1964	19 February 1964	1 day	UDSG	—		Post abolished (1961–1975)	
—		Omar Bongo (1935–2009) (Note: Previously named Albert-Bernard Bongo; changed name on 29 September 1973, after conversion to Islam. Added Ondimba to the name on 15 November 2003.)	28 November 1967	2 December 1967	30 days	BDG until 1968 renamed to PDG	—		Post abolished (1961–1975)	
2		Omar Bongo (1935–2009)	2 December 1967	8 June 2009 (Note: The duties were suspended from 6 May 2009 until 8 June 2009.) #	41 years, 162 days	BDG until 1968 renamed to PDG	1973^{[§]}		Post abolished (1961–1975)	
2		Omar Bongo (1935–2009)	2 December 1967	8 June 2009 #	41 years, 162 days	BDG until 1968 renamed to PDG	1979^{[§]}	—N/a	Mébiame; Oyé-Mba; Obame-Nguema; Ntoutoume Emane; Eyeghe Ndong	
2		Omar Bongo (1935–2009)	2 December 1967	8 June 2009 #	41 years, 162 days	BDG until 1968 renamed to PDG	1986^{[§]}	—N/a	Mébiame; Oyé-Mba; Obame-Nguema; Ntoutoume Emane; Eyeghe Ndong	
2		Omar Bongo (1935–2009)	2 December 1967	8 June 2009 #	41 years, 162 days	BDG until 1968 renamed to PDG	1993	—N/a	Mébiame; Oyé-Mba; Obame-Nguema; Ntoutoume Emane; Eyeghe Ndong	
2		Omar Bongo (1935–2009)	2 December 1967	8 June 2009 #	41 years, 162 days	BDG until 1968 renamed to PDG	1998	—N/a	Mébiame; Oyé-Mba; Obame-Nguema; Ntoutoume Emane; Eyeghe Ndong	
2		Omar Bongo (1935–2009)	2 December 1967	8 June 2009 #	41 years, 162 days	BDG until 1968 renamed to PDG	2005	—N/a	Mébiame; Oyé-Mba; Obame-Nguema; Ntoutoume Emane; Eyeghe Ndong	
—		Didjob Divungi Di Ndinge (born 1946) (Note: Acted for Bongo during his incapacitation in the hospital, Vice President.)	6 May 2009	10 June 2009	35 days	ADERE	—	—N/a	Eyeghe Ndong	
—		Rose Francine Rogombé (1942–2015) (Note: Succeeded Bongo as the constitutional successor, President of the Senate.)	10 June 2009	16 October 2009	128 days	PDG	—	—N/a	Eyeghe Ndong; Biyoghé Mba	
3		Ali Bongo (born 1959) (Note: Son of Omar Bongo. Born as Alain-Bernard Bongo.) (Note: Vice President Pierre Claver Maganga Moussavou (PSD) acted for Bongo during his illness, leading the cabinet meetings between 15 November 2018 and 25 January 2019; however, he wasn't officially appointed as acting president.)	16 October 2009	30 August 2023 (Deposed in a coup)	13 years, 318 days	PDG	2009	—N/a	Biyoghé Mba; Ndong Sima; Ona Ondo; Issoze-Ngondet; Nkoghe Bekale; Raponda; By Nze	
3		Ali Bongo (born 1959)	16 October 2009	30 August 2023 (Deposed in a coup)	13 years, 318 days	PDG	2016	—N/a	Biyoghé Mba; Ndong Sima; Ona Ondo; Issoze-Ngondet; Nkoghe Bekale; Raponda; By Nze	
3		Ali Bongo (born 1959)	16 October 2009	30 August 2023 (Deposed in a coup)	13 years, 318 days	PDG	2023	—N/a	Biyoghé Mba; Ndong Sima; Ona Ondo; Issoze-Ngondet; Nkoghe Bekale; Raponda; By Nze	
—		Brice Oligui Nguema (born 1975)	30 August 2023	3 May 2025	1 year, 246 days	UDB (Note: Military (CTRI) until 4 March 2025 / Independent until 23 June 2025.)	—	—N/a	Ndong Sima	
4		Brice Oligui Nguema (born 1975)	3 May 2025	Incumbent	1 year, 162 days	UDB	2025	Nguema I	Post abolished (from 2025)	
4		Brice Oligui Nguema (born 1975)	3 May 2025	Incumbent	1 year, 162 days	UDB	—	Nguema II	Post abolished (from 2025)	

== Latest election ==
Candidate	Party	Votes	%
Brice Oligui Nguema	Independent (Rally of Builders)	588,074	94.85
Alain Claude Bilie By Nze	Ensemble pour le Gabon	19,265	3.11
Joseph Lapensée Essigone	Independent	3,744	0.60
Gninga Chaning Zenaba	Independent	2,419	0.39
Alain Simplice Gombré	Gabonese Patriotic Party	2,299	0.37
Stéphane Germain Iloko	Large Rassemblement Arc-en-ciel	2,214	0.36
Axel Stophène Ibinga Ibinga	Independent	1,384	0.22
Thierry Yvon Michel N'Goma	Independent	601	0.10
Total		620,000	100.00
Valid votes		620,000	96.48
Invalid/blank votes		22,632	3.52
Total votes		642,632	100.00
Registered voters/turnout		916,625	70.11
Source: CC

== See also ==
- First Lady of Gabon
- Vice President of Gabon
- Prime Minister of Gabon
- List of colonial governors of Gabon
- Politics of Gabon
