= June 1946 French legislative election in Gabon–Moyen Congo =

Elections to the French National Assembly were held in French Gabon and French Congo on 2 June 1946, with a second round on 30 June.

== Electoral system ==
The two seats allocated to the constituency were elected on two separate electoral rolls; French citizens elected one MP from the first college, whilst non-citizens elected one MP in the second college.

== Results ==
=== First college ===
Candidate	Party	First round		Second round	
Candidate	Party	Votes	%	Votes	%
Henri Seignon	French Section of the Workers' International	674	33.04	750	44.91
Gabriel d'Arboussier		492	24.12		
Jean Puytoroc	Popular Republican Movement	451	22.11	494	29.58
Maurice Bayrou		423	20.74	426	25.51
Total		2,040	100.00	1,670	100.00
Valid votes		2,040	98.03	1,670	98.06
Invalid/blank votes		41	1.97	33	1.94
Total votes		2,081	100.00	1,703	100.00
Registered voters/turnout		3,597	57.85	3,673	46.37
Source: Sternberger et al.

=== Second college ===
Candidate	Votes	%
Félix Tchicaya	3,356	63.25
Jean-Hilaire Aubame	869	16.38
Jacques Opangault	595	11.21
Louis Bigmann	183	3.45
Three other candidates	303	5.71
Total	5,306	100.00
Valid votes	5,306	97.36
Invalid/blank votes	144	2.64
Total votes	5,450	100.00
Registered voters/turnout	6,887	79.13
Source: Sternberger et al.
