= 1964 Gabonese parliamentary election =

Parliamentary elections were held in Gabon on 12 April 1964. The elections were originally scheduled to be held during the week of an abortive coup, but President Leon M'ba of the Gabonese Democratic Bloc (BDG) dissolved the National Assembly and rescheduled them for 12 April. Despite widespread lack of free speech and intimidation of voters, the opposition still garnered 45% of the vote.

== Background ==
The elections were originally to be held the week of an abortive coup. As a result of the coup, M'ba dissolved the National Assembly and rescheduled them for 12 April. Upon insistence of the French government, M'ba allowed opposition candidates to run, which it claimed was the main reason for the coup. However, opposition leaders were barred from participating because of their involvement in the coup, and known anti-M'ba organizers were deported to remote parts of the country.

== Campaign ==
The Gabonese Democratic and Social Union (UDSG) practically disappeared from the political scene, as many of its leaders had been jailed because of the coup, and M'ba's opposition was composed of parties that lacked national focus and maintained only regional or pro-democracy platforms. The two major factions of this were the one who supported Aubame and one who was headed by a trade union leader

== Conduct ==
M'ba was known to have bribed voters with banknotes, and serious electoral irregularities were reported.

France closely followed the elections, deporting a Peace Corps teacher. The French military still maintained a presence in the country, which may have been intimidating voters, and also distributed leaflets and supported M'ba by other means.

== Results ==
Despite issues with the elections, the opposition received 45% of the vote and 16 of 47 seats in the National Assembly, while the BDG received 55% of the vote and 31 seats. The opposition disputed the results, and held strikes across the country, though these did not have a sizeable impact on business.

Party	Votes	%	Seats
Gabonese Democratic Bloc	142,389	55.38	31
Gabonese Democratic and Social Union	114,704	44.62	16
Total	257,093	100.00	47
Valid votes	257,093	97.84	
Invalid/blank votes	5,679	2.16	
Total votes	262,772	100.00	
Registered voters/turnout	309,049	85.03	
Source: Nohlen et al.
