= 1973 Gabonese general election =

- 23 February 1973
- Presidential election
- Turnout: 97.75%
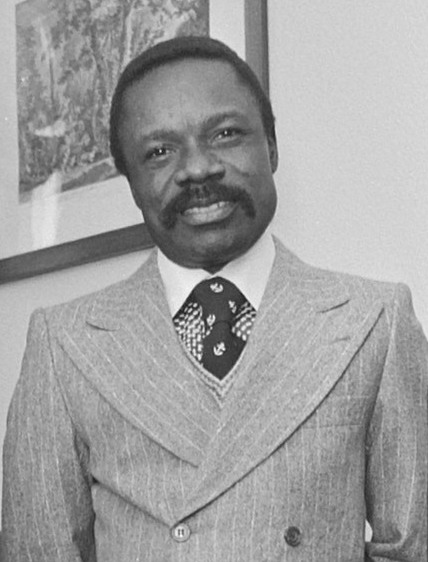
Candidate	Omar Bongo
Party	PDG
Popular vote	515,841
Percentage	100%
President before election
Omar Bongo
PDG
Elected President
Omar Bongo
PDG

General elections were held in Gabon on 25 February 1973 to elect a President and the National Assembly. The country was a one-party state at the time, with the Gabonese Democratic Party (PDG) as the sole legal party. PDG leader and incumbent president Omar Bongo was the only candidate in the presidential election, and was unopposed for a full term. Bongo had ascended as president after Léon M'ba died just days after swearing-in for a second term in 1967; Bongo had declared the PDG to be the only legally permitted party a year later.

In the National Assembly election, voters were presented with a single list of 70 PDG candidates, one for each seat in the expanded Assembly.

Voter turnout was allegedly 97.8%.

== Results ==
=== President ===
Candidate	Party	Votes	%
Omar Bongo	Gabonese Democratic Party	515,841	100.00
Total		515,841	100.00
Valid votes		515,841	99.60
Invalid/blank votes		2,091	0.40
Total votes		517,932	100.00
Registered voters/turnout		529,828	97.75
Source: Nohlen et al.

=== National Assembly ===
Party	Votes	%	Seats	+/–
Gabonese Democratic Party	515,841	100.00	70	+23
Total	515,841	100.00	70	+23
Valid votes	515,841	99.60		
Invalid/blank votes	2,091	0.40		
Total votes	517,932	100.00		
Registered voters/turnout	529,828	97.75		
Source: Nohlen et al.
