= Jeunesse Gabonais =

Political party in colonial Gabon, founded in 1922

The Jeunesse Gabonais was the first political party in colonial Gabon. Founded in 1922, it was "outspokenly anti-colonialist without being anti-French". The party's goals were primarily focused on improving educational opportunities and assimilated Gabonese involvement in colonial administration.
