= Gabonese Progress Party =

Political party in Gabon

- Founded: March 1990
- Headquarters: Libreville
- Ideology: Social democracy Democratic socialism
- Political position: Centre-left
- International affiliation: Socialist International (consultative)

The Gabonese Progress Party (French: Parti gabonais du progrès, PGP) is a political party in Gabon.

== History ==
The PGP was established as a left-leaning party in March 1990, at the beginning of the wave of democratization that swept Africa in the early 1990s. Initially, its key leaders were Pierre-Louis Agondjo Okawé, who was President, Marc Saturnin Nan Nguema, who was Vice-President, and Joseph Rendjambe, who was Secretary-General. Rendjambe died in unclear circumstances in May 1990, resulting in riots by angry opposition supporters in Port-Gentil and Libreville. In the 1990 parliamentary elections the PGP won 18 seats, emerging as the third-largest party.

Agondjo Okawé was the PGP candidate in the 1993 presidential elections, finishing third amidst opposition allegations of fraud. President Omar Bongo of the Gabonese Democratic Party (PDG) received more votes than Agondjo Okawé even in the PGP stronghold on Port-Gentil, a fact that was noted skeptically by observers. Agondjo Okawé refused an invitation to join the government in late 1994, following talks between the government and the opposition. In the 1996 parliamentary elections the party was reduced to 10 seats, but was now the second-largest party to the PDG. The PGP supported radical opposition leader Pierre Mamboundou in the 1998 presidential elections in which Bongo again prevailed, with Mamboundou placed second according to official results.

In the 2001 parliamentary elections the PGP was reduced to three seats. Agondjo Okawé announced in March 2005 that he would not be a candidate for the 2005 presidential elections, a decision attributed to old age and declining health. Agondjo Okawé died in August 2005, and was replaced as party leader by Seraphim Ndaot Rembogo. The PGP subsequently experienced internal disagreement regarding its choice of a presidential candidate, ultimately not nominating anyone. In the 2006 parliamentary elections the party won only two seats.

The party did not nominate a candidate for the 2009 presidential elections, and lost its two seats in the 2011 parliamentary elections, which it boycotted.
