= 1995 Gabonese constitutional referendum =

- 23 July 1995

Results
| Choice | Votes | % |
|---|---|---|
| Yes | 215,229 | 96.52% |
| No | 7,758 | 3.48% |
| Valid votes | 222,987 | 97.73% |
| Invalid or blank votes | 5,181 | 2.27% |
| Total votes | 228,168 | 100.00% |
| Registered voters/turnout | 356,376 | 64.02% |

A constitutional referendum was held in Gabon on 23 July 1995. The vote sought public opinion on the implementation of the Paris Accords, which advised that constitutional reforms agreed to by the government and opposition during negotiations the previous year should be put into place. The changes were approved by 96.5% of voters with a 64.0% turnout.

== Results ==
| Choice | Votes | % |
|---|---|---|
| For | 215,229 | 96.5 |
| Against | 7,758 | 3.5 |
| Invalid/blank votes | 5,181 | – |
| Total | 228,169 | 100 |
| Registered voters/turnout | 356,376 | 64.0 |
Source: Nohlen et al.
