= 1990 Gabonese parliamentary election =

Parliamentary elections were held in Gabon in 1990, the first multi-party elections in the country since 1967. The first round of voting was held on 16 September 1990, with a second round due the following week. However, results from 32 of the 120 constituencies were annulled after public protests claiming fraud by the ruling Gabonese Democratic Party and the second round was postponed. Re-runs were held on 21 October, with a second round on 28 October.

Thirteen parties and 553 candidates contested the elections, with the Gabonese Democratic Party retaining control of the National Assembly by winning 63 of the 120 seats.

== Results ==
Party	Seats	+/–
Gabonese Democratic Party	63	–57
MORENA–Woodcutters	20	New
Gabonese Progress Party	18	New
MORENA–Original	7	New
Association for Socialism in Gabon	6	New
Gabonese Socialist Union	4	New
Circle for Renewal and Progress	1	New
Gabonese Union for Democracy and Development	1	New
Total	120	0
Source: Inter-Parliamentary Union
