= 1961 Gabonese general election =

- 12 February 1961
- Turnout: 98.73%
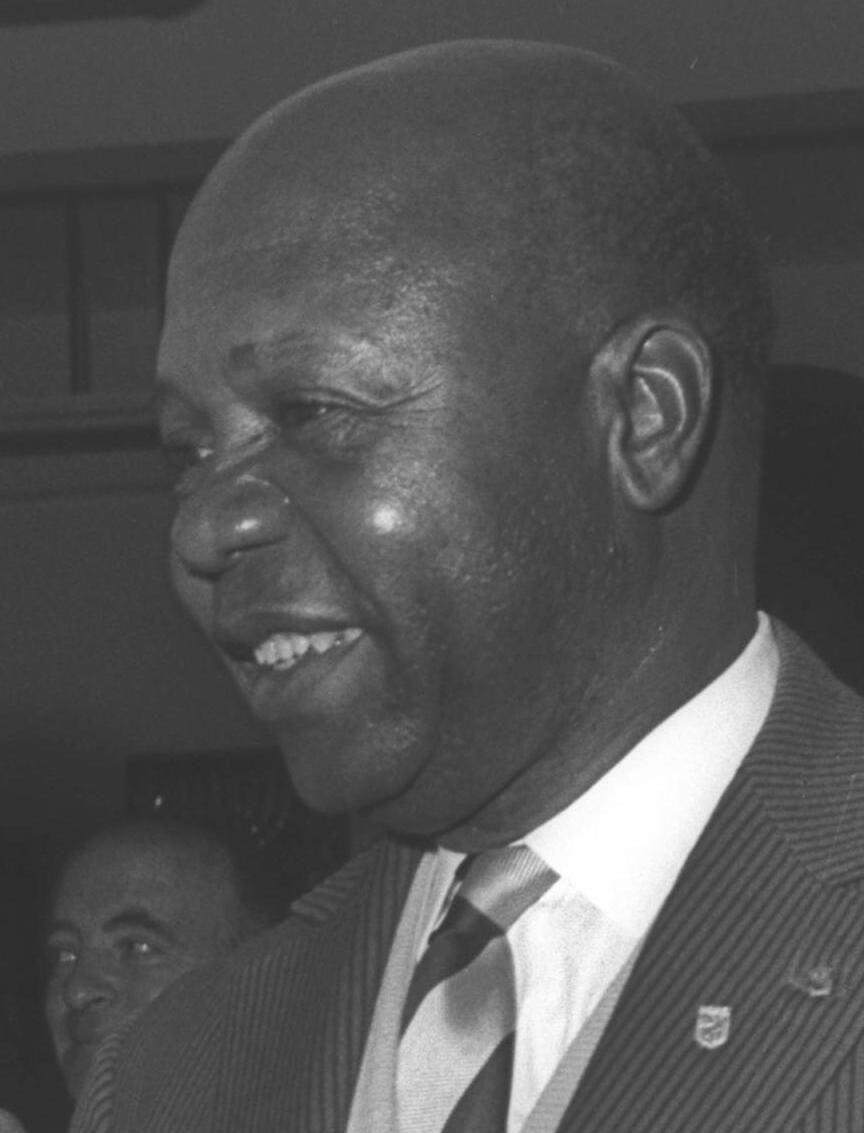
Candidate	Léon M'ba
Party	PDG
Popular vote	315,335
Percentage	100%
Elected President
Léon M'ba
PDG

General elections were held in Gabon on 12 February 1961 to elect a President and the National Assembly. It was the first time a president had been elected. Incumbent Prime Minister Léon M'ba of the Gabonese Democratic Bloc was the only candidate,and was elected unopposed. In the National Assembly election, the Gabonese Democratic Bloc and the Gabonese Democratic and Social Union put forward a joint list of candidates unopposed under the name "National Union". Voter turnout was allegedly 98.7%.

== Results ==
=== President ===
Candidate	Party	Votes	%
Léon M'ba	Gabonese Democratic Bloc	315,335	100.00
Total		315,335	100.00
Valid votes		315,335	99.58
Invalid/blank votes		1,344	0.42
Total votes		316,679	100.00
Registered voters/turnout		320,756	98.73
Source: Nohlen et al.

=== National Assembly ===
Party	Votes	%	Seats
National Union (BDG–UDSG)	315,335	100.00	67
Total	315,335	100.00	67
Valid votes	315,335	99.58	
Invalid/blank votes	1,344	0.42	
Total votes	316,679	100.00	
Registered voters/turnout	320,756	98.73	
Source: Nohlen et al.
