= 1986 Gabonese presidential election =

- 9 November 1986
- Turnout: 99.95%
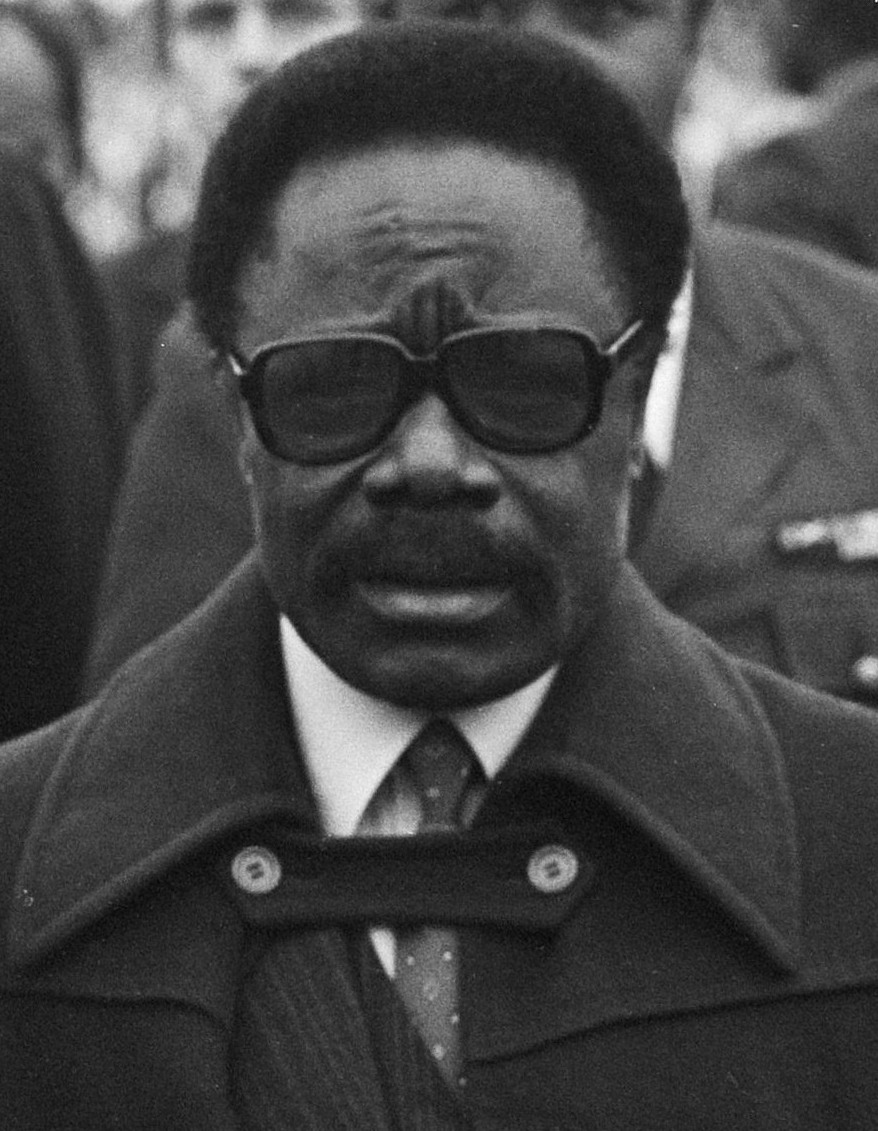
| Candidate | Omar Bongo |
| Party | PDG |
| Popular vote | 903,739 |
| Percentage | 99.97% |
President before election
Omar Bongo
PDG
Elected President
Omar Bongo
PDG

Presidential elections were held in Gabon on 9 November 1986. The country was a one-party state at the time, with the Gabonese Democratic Party (PDG) as the sole legal party. PDG leader and incumbent president Omar Bongo was the only candidate, and was re-elected unopposed. Voter turnout was reported to be 99.9%.

These were the last one-party elections in Gabon, as the country returned to multi-party democracy in 1990.

== Results ==
| Candidate | Party | Votes | % |
|---|---|---|---|
| Omar Bongo | Gabonese Democratic Party | 903,739 | 100.00 |
| Total | | 903,739 | 100.00 |
| Valid votes | | 903,739 | 99.97 |
| Invalid/blank votes | | 300 | 0.03 |
| Total votes | | 904,039 | 100.00 |
| Registered voters/turnout | | 904,467 | 99.95 |
Source: Nohlen et al.
