= Constitution of Gabon =

The Constitution of Gabon is the basic law governing the Gabonese Republic. It was adopted in 1961, rewritten in 1991, 1994, 1995, 1997, 2000, 2003, 2011, 2018, and last revised in 2023.
