= 1952 Gabonese Territorial Assembly election =

Territorial Assembly elections were held in French Gabon in March 1952. The result was a victory for the Gabonese Democratic and Social Union, which won 14 of the 24 contested seats.

== Results ==
Party	Seats
Gabonese Democratic and Social Union	14
Gabonese Mixed Committee	2
Other parties	8
Total	24
