= 1979 Gabonese presidential election =

- 30 December 1979
- Turnout: 100%
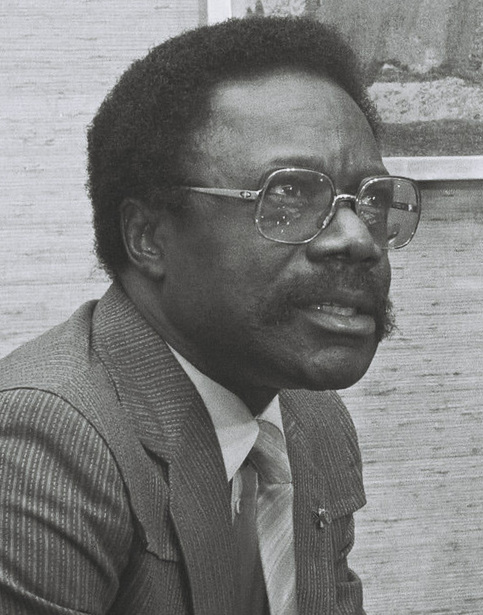
Candidate	Omar Bongo
Party	PDG
Popular vote	727,807
Percentage	100%
President before election
Omar Bongo
PDG
Elected President
Omar Bongo
PDG

Presidential elections were held in Gabon on 30 December 1979, the first time they had been held separately from National Assembly elections. The country was a one-party state at the time, with the Gabonese Democratic Party (PDG) as the sole legal party. PDG leader and incumbent president Omar Bongo was the only candidate, and was unopposed for a second full term. Bongo claimed to have received 100% of valid votes, with only 236 people casting blank or spoiled ballots. Voter turnout was allegedly near 100%.

== Results ==
Candidate	Party	Votes	%
Omar Bongo	Gabonese Democratic Party	725,807	100.00
Total		725,807	100.00
Valid votes		725,807	99.97
Invalid/blank votes		236	0.03
Total votes		726,043	100.00
Registered voters/turnout		726,079	100.00
Source: African Elections Database
