= 1958 Gabonese constitutional referendum =

A referendum on the new constitution of France was held in French Gabon on 28 September 1958 as part of a wider referendum held across the French Union. The new constitution would see the country become part of the new French Community if accepted, or result in independence if rejected. It was approved by 92.6% of voters, with a 78.7% turnout.

== Results ==
Choice	Votes	%
Yes	190,334	92.58
No	15,244	7.42
Invalid/blank votes	3,022	–
Total	208,600	100
Registered voters/turnout	265,161	78.67
Source: Direct Democracy
