= 1967 Gabonese general election =

- 19 March 1967
- Presidential election
- Turnout: 99.41%
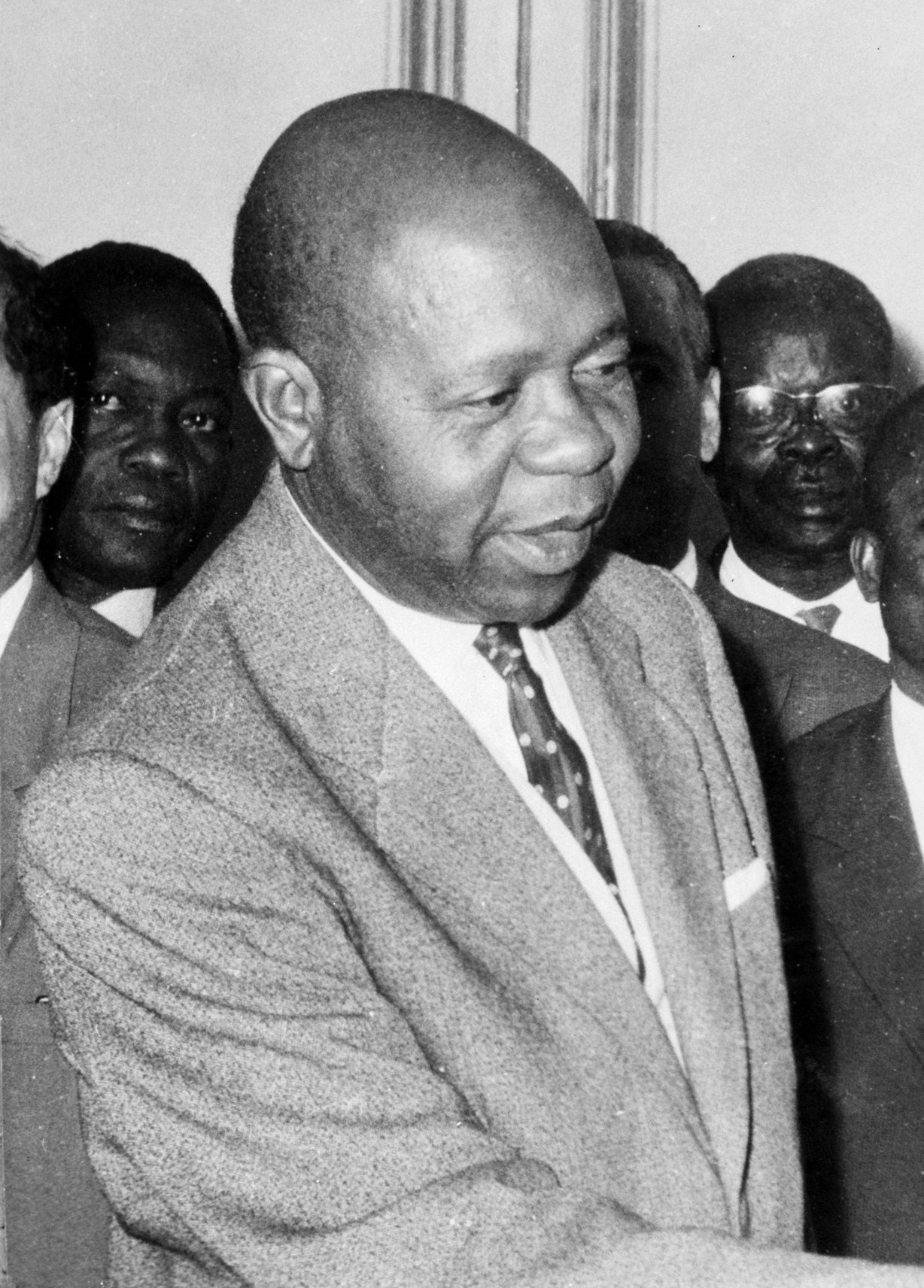
Candidate	Léon M'ba
Party	PDG
Popular vote	346,587
Percentage	100%
President before election
Léon M'ba
PDG
Elected President
Léon M'ba
PDG

General elections were held in Gabon on 19 March 1967 to elect a President and the National Assembly. Incumbent Léon M'ba of the Gabonese Democratic Bloc was the only candidate in the presidential election and was elected unopposed. In the National Assembly election the Gabonese Democratic Bloc was the only party to contest the election, and won all 47 seats. Voter turnout was allegedly 99.4%.

On 27 November 1967, just days after he took his presidential oath at the Gabonese embassy, M'ba died from cancer, and was succeeded by Albert-Bernard Bongo. The following year, Bongo declared his Gabonese Democratic Party (the renamed BDG) to be the only legally permitted party.

== Results ==
=== President ===
Candidate	Party	Votes	%
Léon M'ba	Gabonese Democratic Bloc	346,587	100.00
Total		346,587	100.00
Valid votes		346,587	99.91
Invalid/blank votes		313	0.09
Total votes		346,900	100.00
Registered voters/turnout		348,942	99.41
Source: Nohlen et al.

=== National Assembly ===
Party	Votes	%	Seats	+/–
Gabonese Democratic Bloc	346,587	100.00	47	+16
Total	346,587	100.00	47	0
Valid votes	346,587	99.91		
Invalid/blank votes	313	0.09		
Total votes	346,900	100.00		
Registered voters/turnout	348,942	99.41		
Source: Nohlen et al.
