= 1980 Gabonese parliamentary election =

Parliamentary elections were held in Gabon on 24 February 1980. The country was a one-party state at the time, with the Gabonese Democratic Party as the sole legal party, thereby winning all 89 seats in the enlarged National Assembly. Voter turnout was 108% of the number of registered voters, although this was caused by voters being able to register on election day.

== Results ==
Party	Votes	%	Seats	+/–
Gabonese Democratic Party	706,004	100.00	89	+19
Total	706,004	100.00	89	+19
Valid votes	706,004	99.85		
Invalid/blank votes	1,061	0.15		
Total votes	707,065	100.00		
Registered voters/turnout	651,589	108.51		
Source: Nohlen et al.
