= Gabonese Democratic and Social Union =

Political party in Gabon

Gabonese Democratic and Social Union Union Démocratique et Sociale Gabonaise
- President: Jean-Hilaire Aubame
- Founded: 9 September 1947
- Regional affiliation: African Regroupment Party

The Gabonese Social and Democratic Union (French: Union Démocratique et Sociale Gabonaise, UDSG) was a political party in Gabon.

== History ==
The UDSG was established on 9 September 1947 by Jean-Hilaire Aubame, and was affiliated with the African Regroupment Party. In the 1952 Territorial Assembly elections it won 14 of the 24 elected seats. It won the same number of seats in the 1957 elections, but the Assembly had been enlarged to 40 seats. Although the UDSG was the largest party, the Gabonese Democratic Bloc-led coalition gained a majority of seats.

The party formed an alliance with the BDG for the 1961 general elections. The BDG's Léon M'ba was the sole presidential candidate and the two parties put forward a joint list for the National Assembly elections. Both M'ba and the joint list were unopposed.

In the 1964 parliamentary elections the UDSG won 16 seats, whilst the BDG won 31. The party did not contest the 1967 general elections, and the country became a one-party state in 1968.
