= Politics of Gabon =

The politics of Gabon takes place in a framework of a republic whereby the president of Gabon is head of state and in effect, also the head of government, since he appoints the prime minister and his cabinet. The government is divided into three branches: the executive headed by the prime minister (although previously held by the president), the legislative which is formed by the two chambers of parliament, and the judicial branch. The judicial branch is technically independent and equal to the two other branches, although in practice, since the president appoints its judges, it is beholden to the same president. Since independence, the party system has been dominated by the conservative Gabonese Democratic Party.

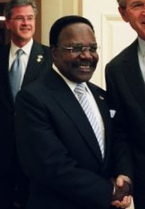
Former President Omar Bongo Ondimba

In March 1991, a new constitution was adopted. Among its provisions are a Western-style bill of rights, the creation of the National Council of Democracy that also oversees the guarantee of those rights and a governmental advisory board which deals with economic and social issues. Multi-party legislative elections were held in 1990-91 even though opposition parties were not declared formally legal.

== Political developments ==
Under the 1961 constitution (revised in 1975 and rewritten in 1991), Gabon became a republic with a presidential form of government. The National Assembly of Gabon has 120 deputies elected for five years. The president is elected by universal suffrage for a seven-year term. The president appoints the prime minister, the cabinet, and judges of the independent Supreme court. The government 1990 made major changes in the political system. A transitional constitution was drafted in May as an outgrowth of a national political conference in March–April and later revised by a constitutional committee. Among its provisions were a Western-style bill of rights; creation of a National Council of Democracy, which oversees the guarantee of those rights; a governmental advisory board on economic and social issues; and an independent judiciary. After approval by the National Assembly, the PDG Central Committee, and the president, the Assembly unanimously adopted the constitution in March 1991. Multi-party legislative elections were held in 1990-91, although opposition parties were not declared formally legal.

After a peaceful transition, the elections produced the first representative, multi-party, National Assembly. In January 1991, the Assembly passed by unanimous vote a law governing the legalization of opposition parties. The president was re-elected in a disputed election in 1993 with 51% of the votes cast. Social and political disturbances led to the 1994 Paris Conference and Accords, which provided a framework for the next elections. Local and legislative elections were delayed until 1996–1997. In 1997, constitutional amendments were adopted to create an appointed Senate, the position of Vice President, and to extend the president's term to seven years. Facing a divided opposition, President Omar Bongo was re-elected in December 1998, with 66% of the votes cast. Although the main opposition parties claimed the elections had been manipulated, there was none of the civil disturbance that followed the 1993 election. The president retains strong powers, such as the authority to dissolve the National Assembly, declare a state of siege, delay legislation, conduct referendums, and appoint and dismiss the prime minister and cabinet members. For administrative purposes, Gabon is divided into nine provinces, which are further divided into 36 prefectures and eight separate subprefectures. The president appoints the provincial governors, the prefects, and the subprefects.

== Political conditions ==
At the time of Gabon's independence in 1960, two principal political parties existed: the Bloc Democratique Gabonais (BDG), led by Leon M'Ba, and the Union Démocratique et Sociale Gabonaise (UDSG), led by Jean-Hilaire Aubame. In the first post-independence election, held under a parliamentary system, neither party was able to win a majority. The BDG obtained support from three of the four independent legislative deputies, and M'Ba was named prime minister. Soon after concluding that Gabon had an insufficient number of people for a two-party system, the two party leaders agreed on a single list of candidates. In the February 1961 election, held under the new presidential system, M'Ba became president and Aubame foreign minister.

This coalition appeared to work until February 1963, when the larger BDG forced the UDSG members to choose between a merger of the parties or resignation. The UDSG cabinet ministers resigned, and M'Ba called an election for February 1964 and a reduced number of National Assembly deputies (from 67 to 47). The UDSG failed to muster a list of candidates able to meet the requirements of the electoral decrees. When the BDG appeared likely to win the election by default, the Gabonese military toppled M'Ba in a bloodless coup on February 18, 1964. French troops re-established his government the next day. Elections were held in April with many opposition participants. BDG-supported candidates won 31 seats and the opposition 16. Late in 1966, the constitution was revised to provide for automatic succession of the vice president should the president die in office. In March 1967, Leon M'Ba and Omar Bongo (then Albert Bongo) were elected president and vice president. M'Ba died later that year, and Omar Bongo became president.

In March 1968, Bongo declared Gabon a one-party state by dissolving the BDG and establishing a new party—the Gabonese Democratic Party. He invited all Gabonese, regardless of previous political affiliation, to participate. Bongo was elected president in February 1975 and re-elected in December 1979 and November 1986 to seven-year terms. In April 1975, the office of vice president was abolished and replaced by the office of prime minister, who had no right to automatic succession. Under the 1991 constitution, in the event of the president's death, the prime minister, the National Assembly president, and the defence minister share power until a new election is held. Using the PDG as a tool to submerge the regional and tribal rivalries that have divided Gabonese politics in the past, Bongo sought to forge a single national movement in support of the government's development policies.

Opposition to the PDG continued, however, and in September 1990, two coup attempts were uncovered and aborted. Economic discontent and a desire for political liberalization provoked violent demonstrations and strikes by students and workers in early 1990. In response to grievances by workers, Bongo negotiated with them on a sector-by-sector basis, making significant wage concessions. In addition, he promised to open up the PDG and organize a national political conference in March–April 1990 to discuss Gabon's future political system. The PDG and 74 political organizations attended the conference. Participants essentially divided into two loose coalitions, the ruling PDG and its allies and the United Front of Opposition Associations and Parties, consisting of the breakaway Morena Fundamental and the Gabonese Progress Party.

The April conference approved sweeping political reforms, including the creation of a national senate, decentralization of the budgetary process, freedom of assembly and press, and cancellation of the exit visa requirement. In an attempt to guide the political system's transformation into a multi-party democracy, Bongo resigned as PDG chairman and created a transitional government headed by a new Prime Minister, Casimir Oye-Mba. The Gabonese Social Democratic Grouping (RSDG), as the resulting government was called, was smaller than the previous government and included representatives from several opposition parties in its cabinet. The RSDG drafted a provisional constitution that provided a basic bill of rights and an independent judiciary but retained strong executive powers for the president. After further review by a constitutional committee and the National Assembly, this document came into force in March 1991.

Despite further anti-government demonstrations after the untimely death of an opposition leader, the first multi-party National Assembly elections in almost 30 years took place in September–October 1990, with the PDG garnering a large majority. Following President Bongo's re-election in December 1993 with 51% of the vote, opposition candidates refused to validate the election results. Serious civil disturbances, which were heavily repressed by the presidential guard, led to an agreement between the government and opposition factions to work toward a political settlement. These talks led to the Paris Accords in November 1994, in which several opposition figures were included in a government of national unity. This arrangement soon broke down, and the 1996 and 1997 legislative and municipal elections provided the background for renewed partisan politics. The PDG won a landslide victory in the legislative election, but several major cities, including Libreville, elected opposition mayors during the 1997 local election. President Bongo coasted to an easy re-election in December 1998 with 66% of the vote against a divided opposition. While Bongo's major opponents rejected the outcome as fraudulent, international observers characterized the result as representative, even if the election suffered from serious administrative problems. There was no serious civil disorder or protests following the election, in contrast to the 1993 election.

President Omar Ali Bongo narrowly beat rival Jean Ping in the official results of the presidential election in 2016. With results showing a trend of success for Ping, the final province's results were released after significant delays, showing a remarkable 99.5% support for President Bongo in Haut-Ogooue. This was conveniently just enough to push Ali Bongo into first place. An EU Election Observation Mission present in the country declared that observers had incurred problems accessing the process of vote counting. The right to demonstrate or express oneself was described by the mission as 'restrictive'. The electoral regulations benefitted President Bongo, according to the Mission's report.

On 31 August 2023, army officers who seized power, ending the Bongo family's 55-year hold on power, named Gen Brice Oligui Nguema as the country's transitional leader. On 4 September 2023, General Nguema was sworn in as interim president of Gabon. The October 2024 Gabon constitutional referendum is the next development.

== Executive branch ==
Main office-holders
Office	Name	Party	Since
President	Brice Clotaire Oligui Nguema	Democratic Union of Builders	30 August 2023

The president is elected by popular vote for a seven-year term. He appoints the prime minister. The Council of Ministers is appointed by the prime minister in consultation with the president. President El Hadj Omar Bongo Ondimba, in power since 1967 and the longest-serving African head of state, was re-elected to another seven-year term according to poll results returned from elections held on November 27, 2005. According to figures provided by Gabon's Interior Ministry, this was achieved with 79.1% of the votes cast. In 2003, the President amended the Constitution of Gabon to remove any restrictions on the number of terms a president is allowed to serve. The president retains strong powers, such as the authority to dissolve the National Assembly, declare a state of siege, delay legislation, conduct referendums, and appoint and dismiss the prime minister and cabinet members.

== Legislative branch ==
The Parliament (Parlement) has two chambers. The National Assembly (Assemblée Nationale) has 120 members, 111 members elected for a five-year term in single-seat constituencies and nine members appointed by a head of state - the president. The Senate (Sénat) has 91 members, elected for a six-year term in single-seat constituencies by local and departmental councillors.

== Judicial branch ==
Gabon's Supreme Court or Cour Supreme consists of three chambers - Judicial, Administrative, and Accounts; Constitutional Court; Courts of Appeal; Court of State Security; County Courts

The Constitutional Court is made up of nine judges who have a tenure of seven years, which is renewable once. Three of the court's members are appointed by the President of the Republic, three by the President of the Senate, and three by the President of the National Assembly.

== Administrative divisions ==
There are nine provincial administrations. These are headquartered in Estuaire, Haut-Ogooue, Moyen-Ogooue, Ngounie, Nyanga, Ogooué-Ivindo, Ogooué-Lolo, Ogooue-Maritime and Woleu-Ntem.
