= Gabonese Democratic Party =

Former ruling and dominant political party of Gabon

Gabonese Democratic Party Parti démocratique gabonais
- Abbreviation: PDG
- Secretary-General: Angélique Ngoma
- Senior Vice-President: Paul Biyoghé Mba
- Founder: Léon M'ba (BDG); Omar Bongo (PDG)
- Founded: 1953; 73 years ago (Gabonese Democratic Bloc) 12 March 1968; 58 years ago (reorganized as Gabonese Democratic Party)
- Merger of: CMG; PDG (1945)
- Headquarters: Libreville
- Youth wing: UJPDG
- Women's wing: UFPDG
- Ideology: Conservatism; Economic liberalism Pan-Africanism; Francophilia; 1978–1987: Planned liberalism 1987–1990: Statism
- Political position: Centre-right
- Religion: Islam
- International affiliation: Centrist Democrat International
- Slogan: Dialogue, Tolerance, Paix "Dialogue, Tolerance, Peace"
- Anthem: "Hymne du Parti Démocratique Gabonais" "Anthem of the Gabonese Democratic Party"
- National Assembly: 21 / 145 (14%)
- Senate: 81 / 100 (81%)

Website
- pdg-gabon.com

The Gabonese Democratic Party (French: Parti démocratique gabonais, PDG) is a political party in Gabon. It was the dominant political party in Gabonese politics from 1961 until 2023, when it was deposed in a coup d'état against President Ali Bongo. It was also the sole legal party between 1968 and 1990.

== History ==
The party was established as the Gabonese Democratic Bloc (Bloc Démocratique Gabonais, BDG) in 1953 as a merger of the Gabonese Mixed Committee and the Gabonese Democratic Party. In the 1957 Territorial Assembly elections it won eight seats, finishing behind the Gabonese Democratic and Social Union (UDSG), which had won 14 seats. However, the BDG was able to form a coalition government with the "Entente–Defence of Gabonese Interests" list, headed by one of its members, and five independents.

The BDG and UDSG formed an alliance prior to the 1961 general elections, with BDG leader Léon M'ba as the sole presidential candidate, and a joint "National Union" list running unopposed for the National Assembly. The 1964 parliamentary elections saw the two parties run against each other, with the BDG winning 31 of the 47 seats.

The BDG was the only party to contest the 1967 general elections, with M'ba re-elected as President. M'ba died later in the year and was succeeded by Omar Bongo. On 12 March 1968 Bongo reorganised the BDG as the Gabonese Democratic Party, which was declared to be the only legally permitted party (though the country had effectively been a one-party state since 1967). For the next quarter-century, the PDG and the government were effectively one. As leader of the PDG, Bongo was automatically reelected as president in 1973, 1979 and 1986, and confirmed in office via a referendum. Voters were presented with single PDG lists for the National Assembly in 1973, 1980 and 1985. Constitutional amendments in May 1990 re-established the multi-party system.

The PDG retained power in the 1990 parliamentary elections, winning 63 of the 120 seats in the National Assembly. Bongo was re-elected again in 1993 with 51% of the vote. The party won 85 seats in the 1996 parliamentary elections, and Bongo was re-elected for a fifth time in 1998, with 67% of the vote. The PDG gained one seat in the 2001 parliamentary elections and Bongo was re-elected again in 2005 with 79% of the vote.

The 2006 parliamentary elections saw the PDG reduced to 82 seats, although it comfortably retained its majority and affiliated parties won a further 17 seats. Bongo died in 2009, and his son Ali Bongo became PDG leader. He won presidential elections later in the year with 42% of the vote. The BDG won 113 seats in the 2011 parliamentary elections, which were boycotted by most of the opposition.

Following the overthrow of Ali Bongo as president in the 2023 Gabonese coup d'état, the party elected Blaise Louembe as its new leader in January 2025. It opted not to stand a candidate in the 2025 presidential election, instead endorsing Brice Oligui Nguema, who overthrew Bongo. This was opposed by some party executives and led to the creation of a splinter faction under Ali Akbar Onanga Y’Obégué, who was named by Bongo as the party's rightful leader. At the parliamentary elections later that year, the PDG was reduced to a distant second place, with a rump of only 15 seats.

== Congresses ==
On 17–21 September 1986, the PDG held its Third Ordinary Congress in Libreville; at the congress, it designated Bongo as its candidate for the single-party November 1986 presidential election.

From 1991 to 1994, the Secretary-General of the PDG was Jacques Adiahénot.

The PDG held its Ninth Ordinary Congress on 19–21 September 2008. At this congress, Faustin Boukoubi, who had been Minister of Agriculture, was elected as the party's Secretary-General; he replaced Simplice Guedet Manzela, who had previously been the Secretary-General for ten years. Also at the congress, the Standing Committee of the Political Bureau, composed of 18 members, was elected. The Standing Committee included two members from each of Gabon's nine provinces, and 15 of its 18 members were also members of the government.

PDG has several branches (or 'Federations') abroad, with the largest being in France and in the United States.

== Electoral history ==
=== Presidential elections ===
Election	Party candidate	Votes	%	Result
1961	Léon M'ba	315,335	100%	Elected ✓
1967	Léon M'ba	346,587	100%	Elected ✓
1973	Omar Bongo	515,841	100%	Elected ✓
1979	Omar Bongo	725,807	100%	Elected ✓
1986	Omar Bongo	903,739	100%	Elected ✓
1993	Omar Bongo	213,793	51.2%	Elected ✓
1998	Omar Bongo	211,955	66.9%	Elected ✓
2005	Omar Bongo	275,819	79.18%	Elected ✓
2009	Ali Bongo	141,952	41.75%	Elected ✓
2016	Ali Bongo	177,722	49.80%	Elected ✓
2023	Ali Bongo	293,919	64.27%	Annulled ✗
2025	Did not participate			

=== National Assembly elections ===
Election	Votes	%	Seats	+/–	Position	Result
1957	16,699 in alliance with Entente and DGI	22.3%	8 / 40	New	2nd	BDG–Entente–DGI coalition government
1961	315,335 in alliance with UDSG	100%	67 / 67	▲59	▲1st	BDG–UDSG coalition government
1964	142,389	55.4%	31 / 47	▼36	1st	Supermajority government
1967	346,587	100%	47 / 47	▲16	1st	Sole legal party
1973	515,841	100%	70 / 70	▲21	1st	Sole legal party
1980	706,004	100%	89 / 89	▲19	1st	Sole legal party
1985	767,674	100%	111 / 120	▲22	1st	Sole legal party
1990			63 / 120	▼57	1st	Majority government
1996			85 / 120	▲22	1st	Supermajority government
2001			86 / 120	▲1	1st	Supermajority government
2006			82 / 120	▼4	1st	Supermajority government
2011			113 / 120	▲31	1st	Supermajority government
2018	in alliance with RV and UDIS		100 / 143	▼13	1st	PDG–RV–UDIS coalition government
2025	in alliance with UDB		21 / 145	▼79	▼2nd	Opposition

=== Senate elections ===
Election	Seats	+/–	Position	Result
1997	52 / 92	New	1st	Governing majority
2003	67 / 92	▲15	1st	Governing supermajority
2009	75 / 102	▲8	1st	Governing supermajority
2014	81 / 100	▲6	1st	Governing supermajority

== See also ==
- Viviane Biviga
- Raphael Mangouala
- Antoine Mboumbou Miyakou
- Pierre Sockat
- Simone Saint-Dénis
