= Armed Forces of Gabon =

Gabonese Defense and Security Forces
- Forces de défense et de sécurité gabonaises
- Gabonese Coat of arms
- Founded: 1960
- Service branches: Army; Air Force; Navy; National Gendarmerie
- Headquarters: Libreville

Leadership
- Commander-in-Chief: General Brice Clotaire Oligui Nguema
- Minister of National Defence: Brigitte Onkanowa
- Chief of Staff: Colonel Aimé-Vivian Oyini

Personnel
- Military age: 20 years of age
- Active personnel: 5,000 (2017)

Expenditure
- Budget: $81.52 million (FY17)
- Percent of GDP: 0.55% (FY17)

Industry
- Foreign suppliers: France; United States; China; Israel; South Africa; Russia; Belgium; Brazil; Spain; Sweden; Austria; India

Related articles
- History: 1964 Gabonese coup d'état Central African Republic Civil War; 2019 Gabonese coup d'état attempt 2023 Gabonese coup d'état
- Ranks: Military ranks of Gabon

The Armed Forces of Gabon (French: Forces armées gabonaises), officially the Gabonese Defense and Security Forces (Forces de défense et de sécurité gabonaises), is the national professional military of Gabon, divided into the Army, Air Force, Navy, and a National Gendarmerie, consisting of about 5,000 personnel. The armed forces includes a well-trained, well-equipped 1,800-member guard that provides security for the President of Gabon. Although the President of Gabon has authority over all of the armed forces, the Ministry of National Defense administers it.

== Organizational structure ==
=== Army ===
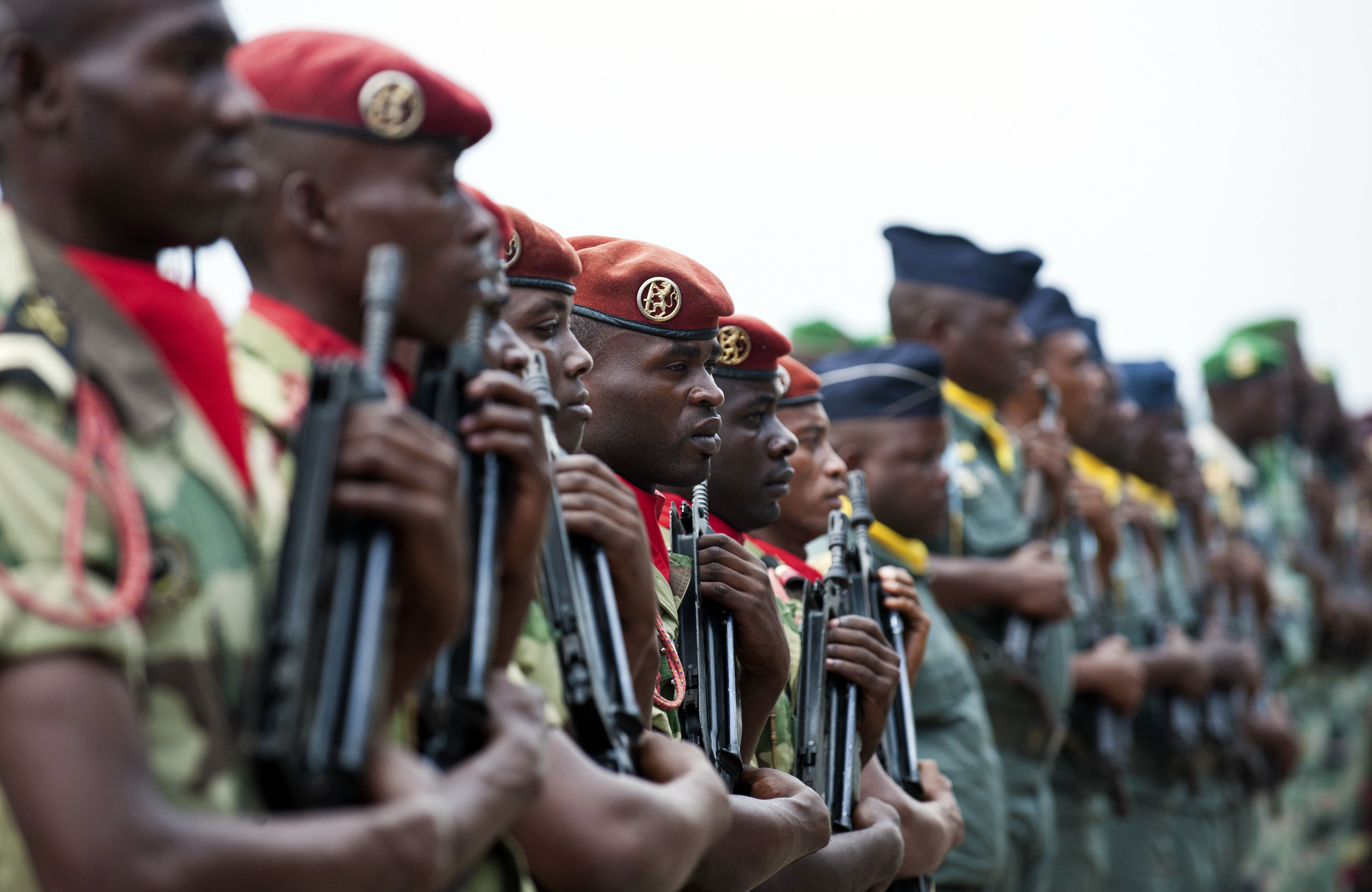
Personnel of the Armed Forces stand in formation during the opening day ceremony of the Central Accord Exercise in Libreville.

The Gabonese Army (French: Armée de terre gabonaise) is the land component of the armed forces, specializing in infantry and mechanized reconnaissance. It was created on December 6, 1960, by decree of president Léon M'ba from non-commissioned officers who served in the French colonial army, mainly the 2nd company of the 21st BIMA. Following independence, Gabon signed defense agreements with France, mainly on technical assistance and training. Until June 1964, the title of Chief of Staff of the Gabonese Armed Forces was held by a senior French Army officer. In 1962 a detachment of the Auxiliary Women of the Gabonese Armed Forces (AFFAG), commanded by Lieutenant Ba Oumar at the military camp of Owendo, was created. President M'ba promoted the initiative following a visit to Tel Aviv, Israel, where he met female staff in its Defense Forces.

==== Order of battle ====
- Republican Guard Battalion (Libreville)
    - 1 Light Armoured recon unit
  - 3 Infantry companies
    - 1 Artillery battery
  - 1 Air Defence battery
- Airborne Regiment
  - 1 Command company
  - 1 Recon & Support company
  - 3 Airborne companies
- 1 Light Armoured Recon Battalion
  - 2 Armoured squads
  - 1 Command & Logistics company
- Support Command Regiment
  - 1 Artillery battery
  - 1 Mortar battery
  - 1 MRLS battery (8 Teruel MRL)
  - 1 Engineer company
  - Logistic units
- 7 Military Regions
  - 7 Motorised infantry battalions (1 battalion for each region)

=== Air Force ===
==== Order of battle ====
- Fighter Squadron 1-02 Leyou at BA02 Franceville with:
  - Mirage F-1AZ
  - MB-326M Impala I
- Heavy Transport Squadron at BA01 Libreville with:
  - C-130 Hercules
  - CN-235
- Ministerial Air Liaison Group (Groupe de Liaison Aérien Ministériel or GLAM) at BA01 Libreville with:
  - 1 Falcon-900EX
  - 1 Gulfstream-III

==== Facilities ====
- BA01 Libreville
- BA02 Franceville
- Tchibanga

=== Navy ===
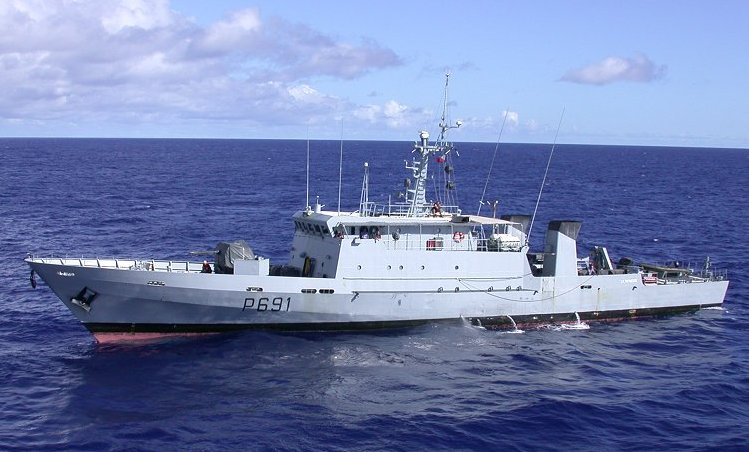
The Gabonese Navy uses a P400-class patrol vessel similar to this one

The Gabonese Navy (French: Marine Nationale du Gabon) is the official maritime branch of the armed forces. It was created in December 1960 as part of the army, and only became an independent entity in 1983. The navy's core purpose is to monitor the country's coastal waters, including 800 km of coastline.

- Headquarters Staff (Libreville)
- Port-Gentil Naval Base
- Mayumba Naval Base
- Port-Gentil Aviation Base
- Marine Rifle Battalion (since 1984)

== Other security forces ==
=== National Gendarmerie ===
The National Gendarmerie of Gabon (Gendarmerie nationale gabonaise) is the national police force of Gabon responsible for law enforcement in the country. It was formed on March 10, 1960, when Gabon, formerly French Equatorial Africa, gained its independence from France. It originated from Libreville Gendarmerie Detachment 1929, which was commanded by Governor General of French Equatorial Africa, Félix Eboue. The main tasks of the gendarmerie are to defend the country's borders, ensure public safety, and to enforce actions taken by judicial and government authorities. The National Gendarmerie is under the direct command of the President of Gabon.

=== Republican Guard ===
The Gendarmerie is also in charge of the Republican Guard (French: Garde républicaine, GR). It is viewed as the most powerful and sophisticated of the security forces. It is primarily tasked with protecting the president and ensures regime stability.

== Equipment ==
=== Small arms ===
Name	Origin	Type	Variant	Notes
M16 rifle	United States	Assault rifle		
FN FAL	Belgium	Battle rifle		
FN CAL	Belgium	Assault rifle		
FN MAG	Belgium	General-purpose machine gun		
AK-47	Soviet Union	Assault rifle		
AKM	Soviet Union	Assault rifle		
RPD	Soviet Union	Light machine gun		
FAMAS	France	Assault rifle		Bullpup design
MILAN	France	Anti-tank guided missile		
M40	United States	Recoilless rifle	M40A1	

=== Armour ===
Name	Origin	Type	In Service	Notes
Armored fighting vehicles
AML-60/AML-90	France/South Africa	Reconnaissance vehicle	24	Including the South African Eland derivative.
EE-3 Jararaca	Brazil	Reconnaissance vehicle	12	
EE-9 Cascavel	Brazil	Reconnaissance vehicle	14	
ERC-90F4 Sagaie	France	Reconnaissance vehicle	6	
RAM MK3	Israel	Reconnaissance vehicle	7	
Véhicule Blindé Léger	France	Reconnaissance vehicle	14	
EE-11 Urutu	Brazil	Infantry fighting vehicle	12	Armed with 20 mm gun.
VN-1	China	Infantry fighting vehicle	5	
Type 07P	China	Infantry fighting vehicle	14	
V-150 Command	United States	Armoured personnel carrier	9	
Bastion	France	Armoured personnel carrier	5	
WZ-523	China	Armoured personnel carrier	3	
Véhicule de l'Avant Blindé	France	Armoured personnel carrier	5	
VXB-170	France	Armoured personnel carrier	12	
Pandur I	Austria	Armoured personnel carrier	1	
ZFB-05	China	Armoured personnel carrier	3	
Aravis	France	Mine-Resistant Ambush Protected	8	
Matador	South Africa	Mine-Resistant Ambush Protected	24	
Ashok Leyland MPV	India	Mine-Resistant Ambush Protected	34	

=== Artillery ===
Name	Origin	Type	In Service	Notes
M101	United States	105 mm towed howitzer	4	
Type 63	China	107 mm multiple rocket launcher	16	
Type 90	China	122 mm multiple rocket launcher	4	
Teruel	Spain	140 mm multiple rocket launcher	8	
MO-120-RT	France	120 mm mortar	4	

=== Air defense ===
Name	Origin	Type	In Service	Notes
ERC-20	France	20mm self-propelled anti-aircraft weapon	4	
ZPU-4	Soviet Union	14.5mm towed anti-aircraft gun	Unknown	
ZU-23-2	Soviet Union	23 mm towed anti-aircraft gun	24	
M1939	Soviet Union	37 mm towed anti-aircraft gun	10	
L/70	Sweden	40 mm towed anti-aircraft gun	3	

=== Retired aircraft ===
Previous aircraft operated were the CM.170 Magister, Embraer EMB 110, Fokker F28, Aérospatiale N 262, Reims C.337, and the Alouette II helicopter.

=== Naval equipment ===
Vessel	Origin	Type	In service	Notes
Kership	France	Offshore patrol		1 on order
P400	France	Coastal patrol	3	
BATRAL	France	Landing craft	1	2 ordered, only one received

== Ceremonial traditions ==
- In April 2001, then-Defense Minister Bongo visited China, during which he reviewed the PLA honor guard upon arrival, and proposed to his Chinese counterpart Chi Haotian that members of the battalion will go to Gabon to help set up and train professional ceremonial units in the Gabonese military. In March 2003, after just under three years, the Chinese Ministry of National Defense sent four officers led by Lieutenant Colonel Wang Yuanjing to Libreville by the end of November of that year, after which they stayed to train the Gabonese guard of honour for more than six months.
- The Principal Music Band of the Gabonese Defense Forces was created in 2010. It brings together elements of the Band of the National Gendarmerie, the Armed Forces and the Prytanée militaire de Libreville. It has a staff of 50 professional currently directed by Captain Jean-Baptiste Rabimbinongo. Its conductor, Lieutenant Léa Nzoufa Nze, was the first woman to conduct a military band to the Saumur International Festival of Military Bands. It takes part in many official ceremonies such as National Flag Day and the military parade marking the country's independence.
