= Gabonese coup d'état =

Gabonese coup d'état may refer to:

- 1964 Gabonese coup d'état
- 2019 Gabonese coup attempt
- 2023 Gabonese coup d'état

== See also ==
- List of coups d'état and coup attempts by country#Gabon
