= Military ranks of the Armed Forces of Gabon =

The military ranks of Gabon are the military insignia used by the Armed Forces of Gabon. Being a former colony of France, Gabon shares a rank structure similar to that of France - with the addition of the use of the executive curl by naval officers in all shoulder or sleeve insignia marks.

== Commissioned officer ranks ==
The rank insignia of commissioned officers.

Rank group	General / flag officers				Senior officers			Junior officers
Gabonese Army
Gabonese Army	Général d'armée	Général de corps d'armée	Général de division	Général de brigade	Colonel	Lieutenant-colonel	Commandant	Capitaine	Lieutenant	Sous-Lieutenant
Gabonese Navy
Gabonese Navy	Amiral	Vice-amiral d'escadre	Vice-amiral	Contre-amiral	Capitaine de vaisseau	Capitaine de frégate	Capitaine de corvette	Lieutenant de vaisseau	Enseigne de vaisseau de 1^{re} classe	Enseigne de vaisseau de 2^{e} classe
Gabonese Air Force
Gabonese Air Force	Général d'armée	Général de corps d'armée	Général de division	Général de brigade	Colonel	Lieutenant-colonel	Commandant	Capitaine	Lieutenant	Sous-Lieutenant
Rank group	General / flag officers				Senior officers			Junior officers

=== Obsolete ranks ===
Rank group	Field/senior officers			Junior officers
Gabonese Army
Gabonese Army	Senior colonel Colonel major	Senior lieutenant colonel Lieutenant-colonel major	First major Commandant major	Senior Captain; Capitaine major	First lieutenant Lieutenant major
Gabonese Navy
Gabonese Navy	Ship-of-the-line captain, 1st class Capitaine de vaisseau major	Frigate captain (senior); Capitaine de fregate major	Corvette captain (senior); Capitaine de corvette major	Ship-of-the-line lieutenant (senior); Lieutenant de vaisseau	Ship-of-the-line ensign, 1st class (senior); Enseigne de vaisseau 1re classe major
Gabonese Air Force
Gabonese Air Force	Senior colonel Colonel major	Senior lieutenant colonel Lieutenant-colonel major	First major Commandant major	Senior Captain; Capitaine major	First lieutenant Lieutenant major

== Other ranks ==
The rank insignia of non-commissioned officers and enlisted personnel.

Rank group	Senior NCOs					Junior NCOs		Enlisted
Gabonese Army
Gabonese Army	Adjudant-chef major	Adjudant-chef	Adjudant	Sergent-chef	Sergent	Caporal-chef	Caporal	Soldat première	Soldat
Gabonese Navy
Gabonese Navy	Maître-principal major	Maître-principal	Premier maître	Maître	Second maître	Quartier-maître de 1^{ère} classe	Quartier-maître de 2^{ème} classe	Matelot brevet	Matelot
Gabonese Air Force
Gabonese Air Force	Adjudant-chef major	Adjudant-chef	Adjudant	Sergent-chef	Sergent	Caporal-chef	Caporal	Soldat première	Soldat
Rank group	Senior NCOs					Junior NCOs		Enlisted
