= BM-14 =

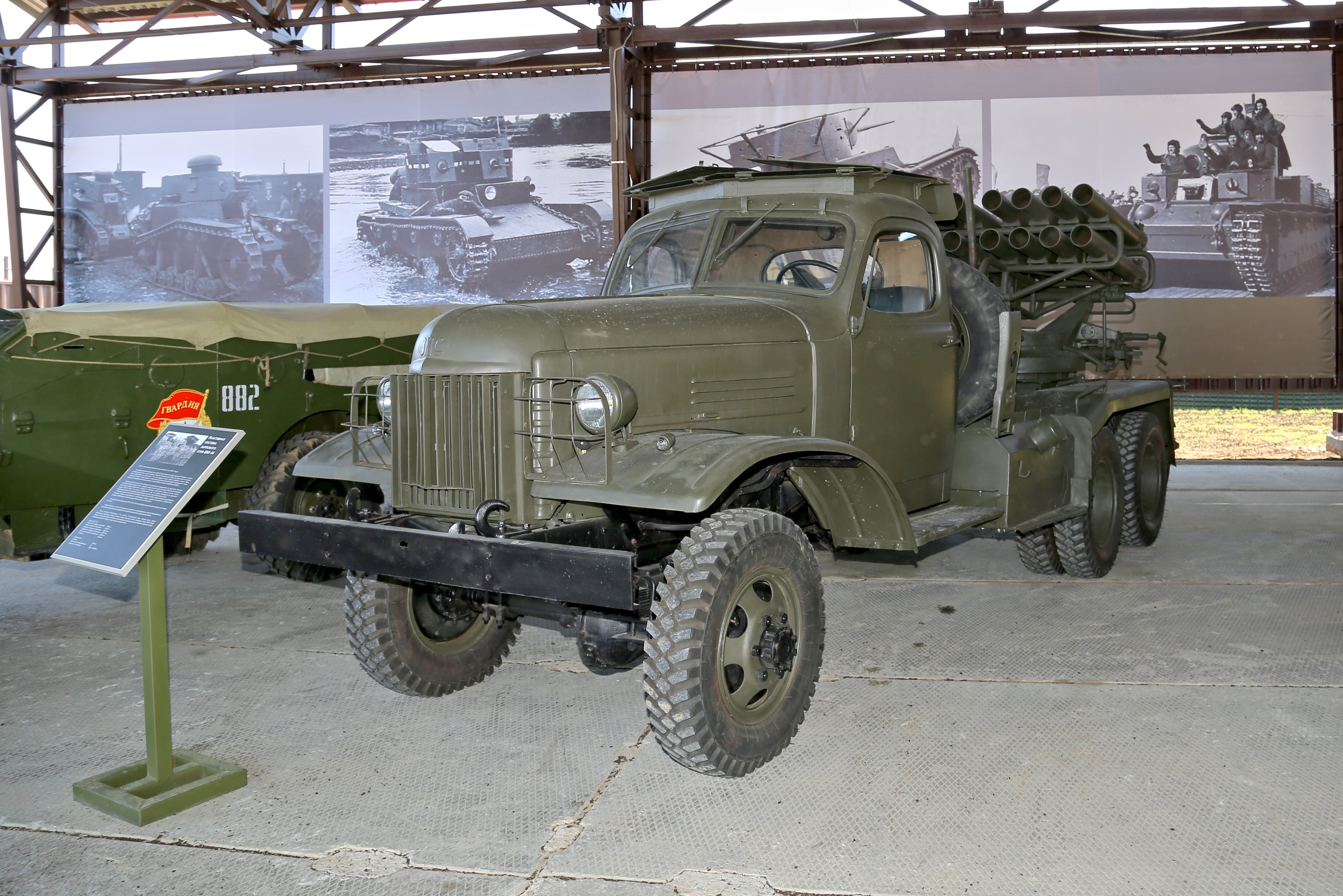
- A 140mm, 16-round launcher (BM-14) mounted on a ZIS-151 truck.
- Type: Multiple rocket launcher
- Place of origin: Soviet Union

Service history
- In service: 1952–present
- Wars: Vietnam War; Cambodian Civil War; Cambodian–Vietnamese War; Dhofar War; Indonesian invasion of East Timor; South African Border War; Angolan Civil War; Lebanese Civil War; Soviet–Afghan War; Algerian Civil War; Somali Civil War; War in Afghanistan (2001–2021); Syrian civil war

Production history
- Designer: NII 303
- Designed: 1950

Specifications
- Mass: 5,323 kg (11,735 lb)
- Length: 5.4 m (17 ft 9 in)
- Width: 1.9 m (6 ft 3 in)
- Height: 2.24 m (7 ft 4 in)
- Crew: 6
- Caliber: Diameter: 140 mm (5.5 in); Length: 1 m (3 ft 3 in); Weight: 39.6 kg (87 lb)
- Barrels: 16 in two rows
- Elevation: +50°/0°
- Traverse: 180°
- Muzzle velocity: 400 m/s (1,300 ft/s)
- Maximum firing range: 9.8 km (6.1 mi)
- Engine: GAZ-51 70 HP; 6-cylinder petrol
- Suspension: Wheeled GAZ-63; 4x4 chassis
- Operational range: 650 km (400 mi)
- Maximum speed: 65 km/h (40 mph)

The BM-14 (BM for Boyevaya Mashina, 'combat vehicle'), is a Soviet-made 140mm multiple launch rocket system (MLRS), normally mounted on a truck.

The BM-14 can fire 140 mm M-14 rockets with a high-explosive fragmentation warhead, a smoke warhead or a chemical warhead. It is similar to the BM-13 "Katyusha" and was partly replaced in service by the 122 mm BM-21 Grad. While the Grad rockets are smaller, they have longer range and carry larger payloads.

Launchers were built in 16 and 17-round variants. The rockets have a maximum range of 9.8 kilometers (6.1 mi).

The weapon is not accurate as there is no guidance system, but it is extremely effective in saturation fire.

== Variants ==
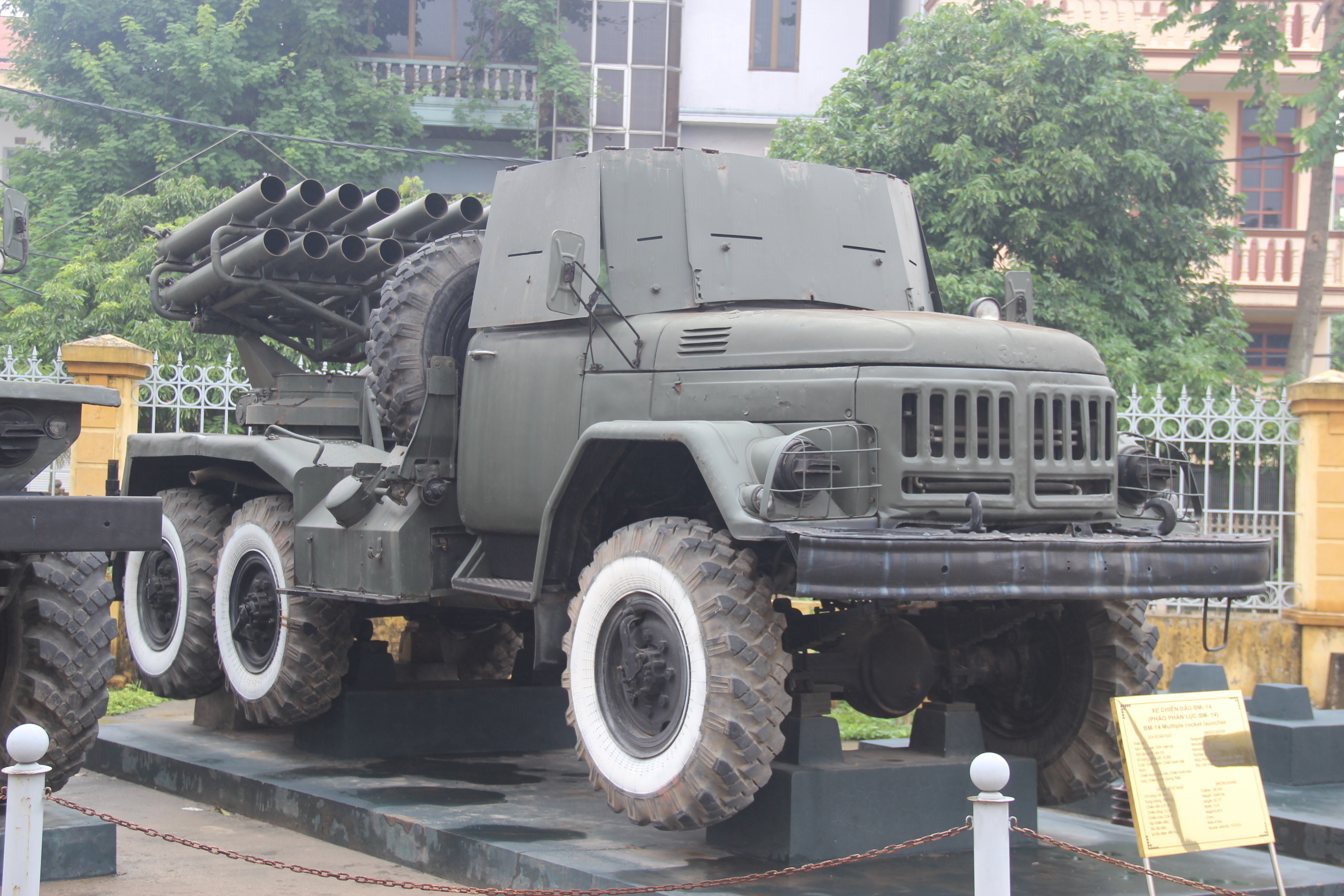
BM-14MM (2B2R)

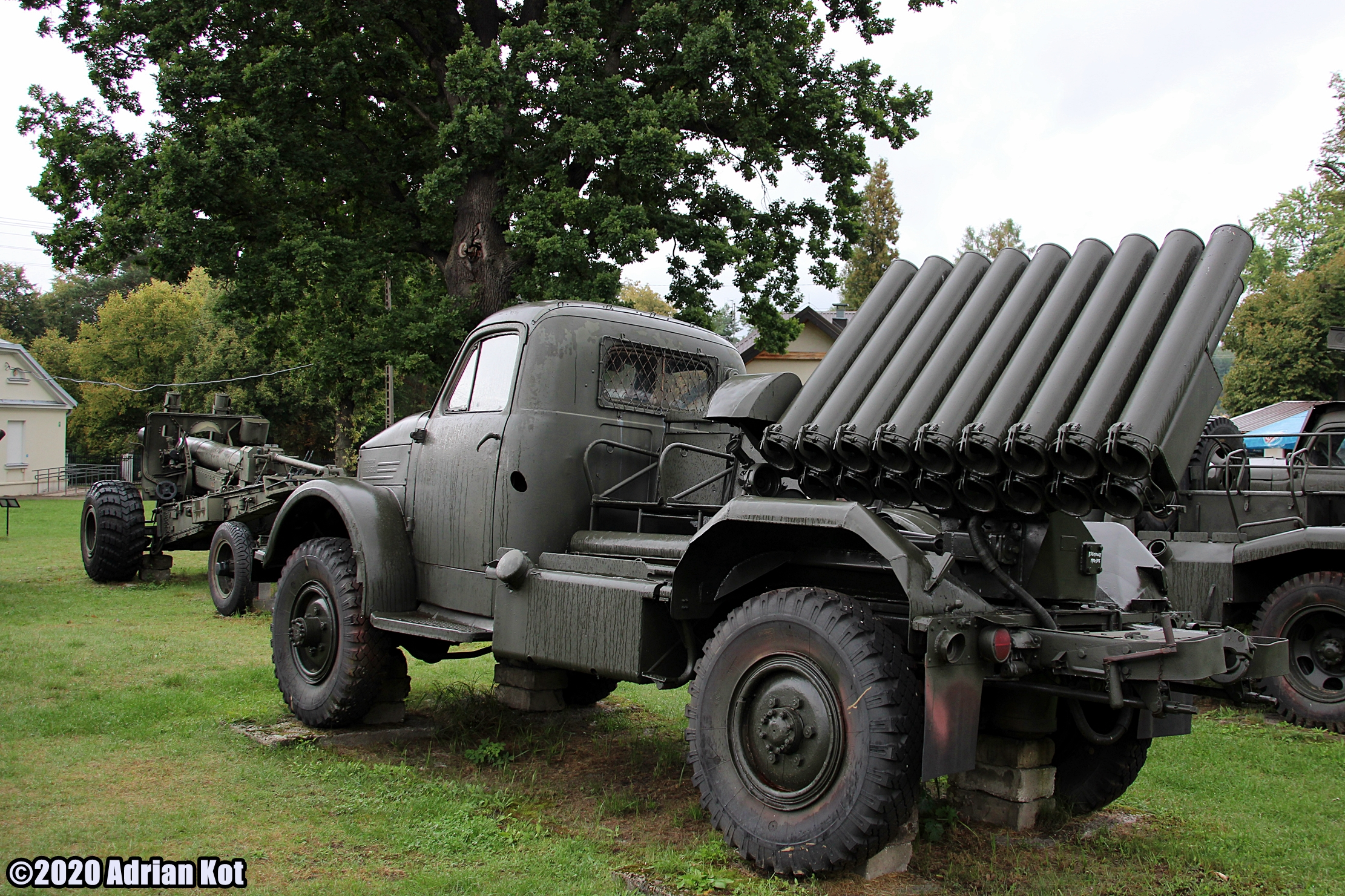
BM-14-17 (8U36)

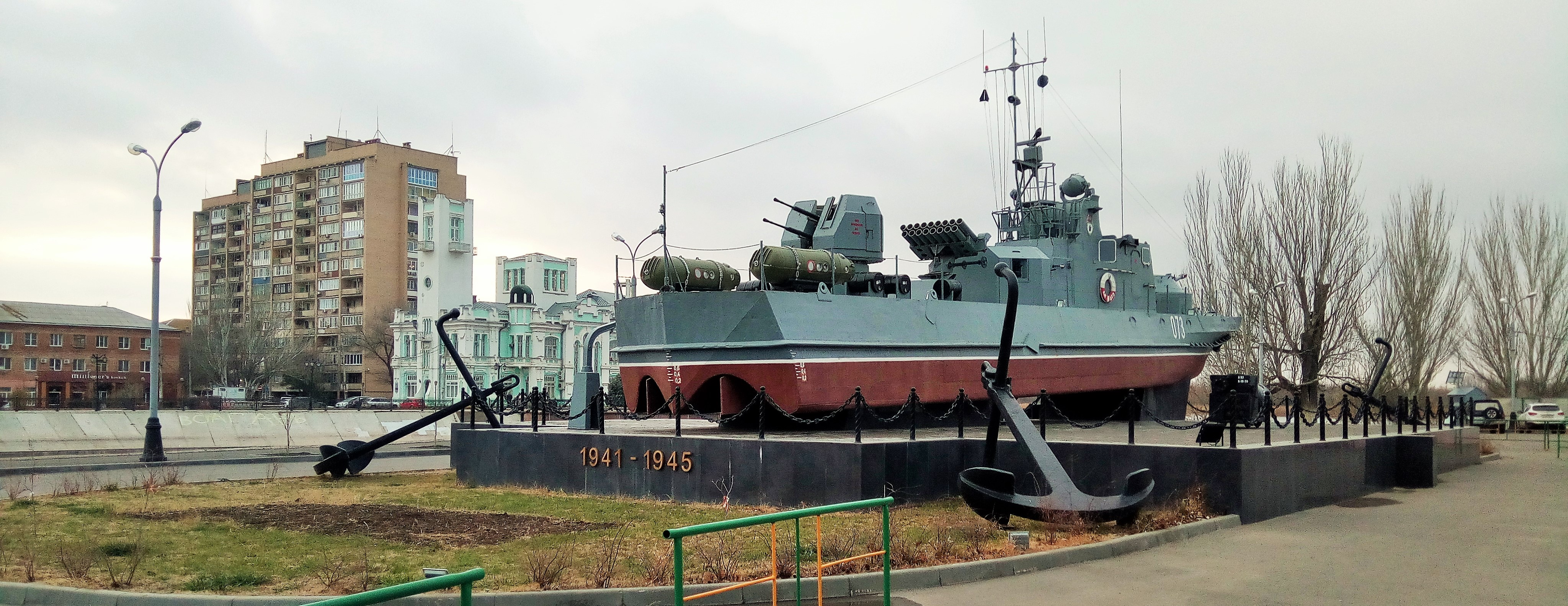
BM-14-17 on the Project 1204 gunboat

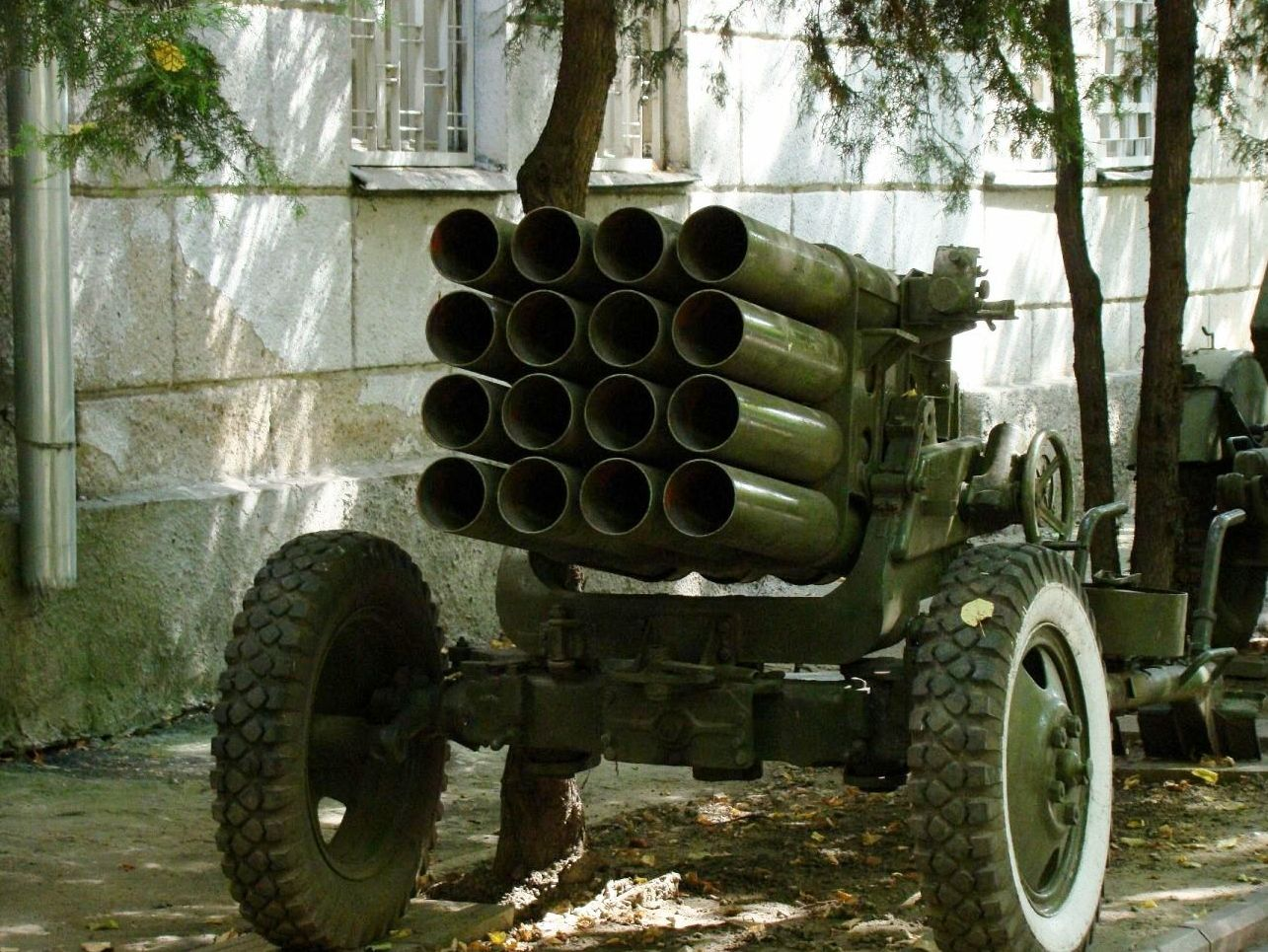
A 140mm, 16-round towed launcher RPU-14 (8U38).

- BM-14 (8U32) − 16-round model (two rows of 8), launcher mounted on the ZIS-151 truck, it entered service in 1952. Also known as BM-14-16
  - BM-14M (2B2) − modified model, mounted on the ZIL-157
  - BM-14MM (2B2R) − final upgrade, mounted on the ZIL-131
- BM-14-17 (8U36) − 17-round (8+9 launch tubes) launcher, mounted on the GAZ-63A, revealed to the public in 1959. This launcher was also used on naval vessels, such as Project 1204 patrol boats
  - BM-14-17M (8U36M) − modified model, mounted on the GAZ-66
- RPU-14 (8U38) − towed 16-round version, based on the carriage of the 85mm gun D-44 and used by Soviet Airborne Troops, where it was replaced by the 122mm BM-21V "Grad-V"

== Ammunition ==
The BM-14 launcher and its variants can fire 140mm rockets of the M-14-series (also called Soviet-made M14 artillery rockets). They have a minimum range of 3.8 kilometers (2.4 mi) and a maximum range of 9.8 kilometers (6.1 mi). The M-14 series consist of three known types:

- M-14-OF − an M-14 rocket with a high-explosive fragmentation warhead containing 3.68 kilograms (8.1 lb) of TNT
- M-14-D − an M-14 rocket with a smoke warhead containing white phosphorus
- M-14-S − an M-14 rocket with a chemical warhead containing 2.2 kilograms (4.9 lb) of sarin

== Use ==
The BM-14-16 was first seen in public during a parade in Red Square, Moscow in 1953 mounted on the rear of a ZIL-151 6×6 truck chassis. In Soviet service, each Motorized Rifle Division and Tank Division had one battalion with 18 launchers attached. While in the Chinese Army each Artillery Division had 32 BM-14-16s. The BM-14 had a short frontline service life, being replaced by the BM-21 Grad in 1964. By 1980, it was mounted on a Zil-131 chassis and used in Soviet Asian military districts, while the RPU-14 remained in frontline service with Soviet Airborne Forces in 1988. In 1990, the RPU-14 began to be replaced by Grad launchers mounted on GAZ-66 trucks.

The North Vietnamese made use of both BM-14 and BM-21 during the Vietnam War. They were often cut down into individual tubes and used for hit-and-run attacks against United States forces. In the beginning of the Ogaden War, the noise of incoming Somali BM-14 rockets spread panic on Ethiopian forces before the Soviets began supplying BM-21s and BMD-20s to the Derg.

During the Soviet–Afghan War, the BM-14-17 was used by both the Democratic Republic of Afghanistan armed forces and mujahideen. Prior to Operation Enduring Freedom in 2001, the Taliban had some BM-14 and Grad mobile launchers at their disposal.

During the Syrian Civil War, a rocket engine from a 140 mm M-14-series rocket was identified on 26 August 2013 by the U.N. fact-finding mission in the Muadamiyat al-Sham district southwest of Damascus, allegedly originating from the chemical attack on Western Ghouta on 21 August 2013.

The rockets nozzle assembly had 10 jet nozzles ordered evenly in a circle with an electrical contact plate in the middle. The bottom ring of the rocket engine had the lot number "Г ИШ 4 25 - 6 7 - 179 К" engraved, which means it was produced in 1967 by factory 179 (Sibselmash plant in Novosibirsk). However, no warhead was observed at the impact site and none of the 13 environmental samples taken in the Western Ghouta area tested positive for sarin, although three had "degradation and/or by-products" possibly originating from sarin. On 18 September, the Russian Presidential Chief of Staff Sergei Ivanov commented on the U.N. missions findings. He said "these rockets were supplied to dozens of countries", but that "the Soviet Union never supplied warheads with sarin to anyone". Another type of rockets was used in the Eastern Ghouta attack.

== Operators ==
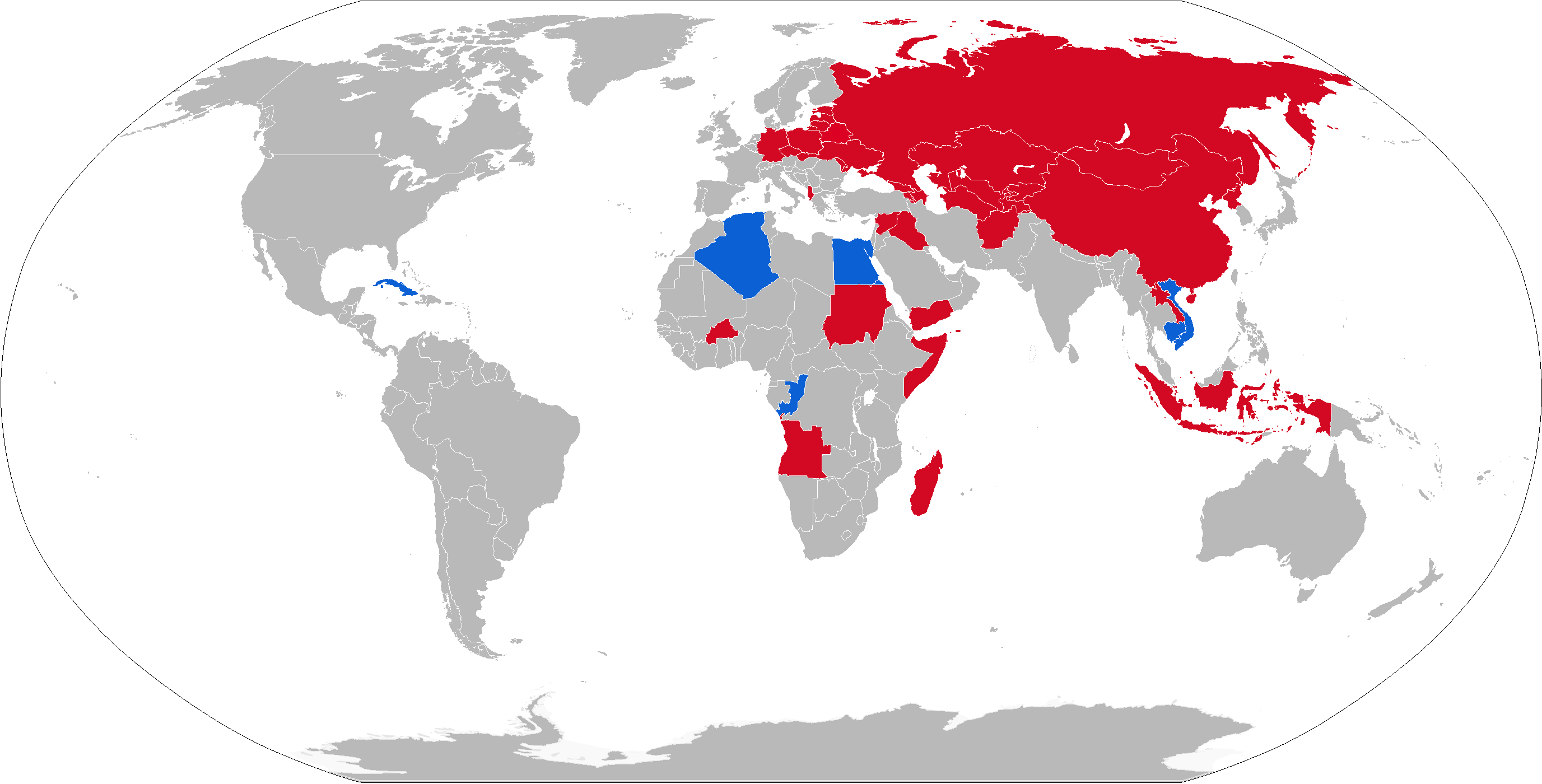
Map of BM-14 operators in blue with former operators in red

=== Current operators ===
- Algeria − 48 BM-14/16 as of 2023
- Cambodia − 20 BM-14-16 as of 2023
- Congo-Brazzaville
- Cuba
- Egypt − 32 as of 2023
- Russia − BM-14-17 mounted on Shmel-class (Project 1204) patrol boats as of 2023
- Vietnam − fielded during the Vietnam War from 1967

=== Former operators ===
- Afghanistan
- Angola − A number destroyed during the Angolan Civil War. Operated BM-14-16s as late as 2011
- China
- Indonesia − Indonesian Marine Corps (Korps Marinir) operated 36 BM-14-17 launchers. Replaced by the RM-70 in 2003
- North Korea
- Poland
- Somalia − BM-14-16 and BM-14-17
- Soviet Union − Passed on to successor states in 1991
- Syria − 200 BM-14 purchased in 1967. Remained in service as late as 2016
- South Yemen − 15 BM-14 in 1989, passed on to the unified Yemeni state
- Yemen

== Similar designs ==
- The Type 63 130mm multiple rocket launcher (not to be confused with the towed Type 63 of 107mm) is the Chinese version of the BM-14-17. It has a slightly smaller calibre but is fitted with 19 instead of 17 launch tubes. The Type 63 MRL is based on the Nanjing NJ-230 or 230A 4x4 truck, a licence-produced version of the Soviet GAZ-63/63A.
- The WP-8z (Polish: Wyrzutnia Pocisków rakietowych) was a Polish towed rocket launcher that was developed in 1960. The weapon was subsequently produced between 1964 and 1965. It fired the same rockets as the RPU-14 but had only 8 launch tubes. The main operator was the 6th Pomeranian Airborne Division (Polish: 6 Pomorska Dywizja Powietrzno-Desantowa). with 12-18 WP-8s in its inventory.

== See also ==
- Type 63 multiple rocket launcher
- Katyusha World War II multiple rocket launchers (BM-13, BM-8, and BM-31)
- M16 (rocket), U.S. 4.5 inch multiple rocket launcher
- BM-21 Grad 122 mm multiple rocket launcher
- BM-27 Uragan 220 mm multiple rocket launcher
