= Prytanée militaire de Libreville =

Gabonese military academy based in Libreville

- Active: 5 November 2001–Present
- Country: Gabon
- Branch: Gabonese Army
- Type: College and high school
- Role: Training
- Garrison/HQ: Libreville
- Nickname(s): PML
- Motto(s): Patriae Optimi Pour la Patrie, être les meilleurs

The Prytanée militaire de Libreville (French pronunciation: [pʁitane militɛʁ də libʁəvil], PML) is the Gabonese military academy based in Libreville. It is the sole training institution of the armed forces.

== Overview ==
It was founded on 5 November 2001 with the aim of forming the "future intellectual elite of the country". Its mission is to provide general education preparing for enlisted soldiers in the Armed Forces of Gabon as well as commissioned and non-commissioned officers, and some enlisted personnel having special aptitudes and roles. It recruits a special entrance exam to the 6th grade. The pupils of this establishment are traditionally called "troop children", they receive a physical and moral education predisposing them to the career of officer. The best students PML are solemnly rewarded Friday, at the end of the school year.

In 2019, Lieutenant Kelly Ondo Obiang, who is an alumnus of the school, led the Gabonese Republican Guard during the coup d'état attempt against President Ali Bongo Ondimba.
