= 85 mm divisional gun D-44 =

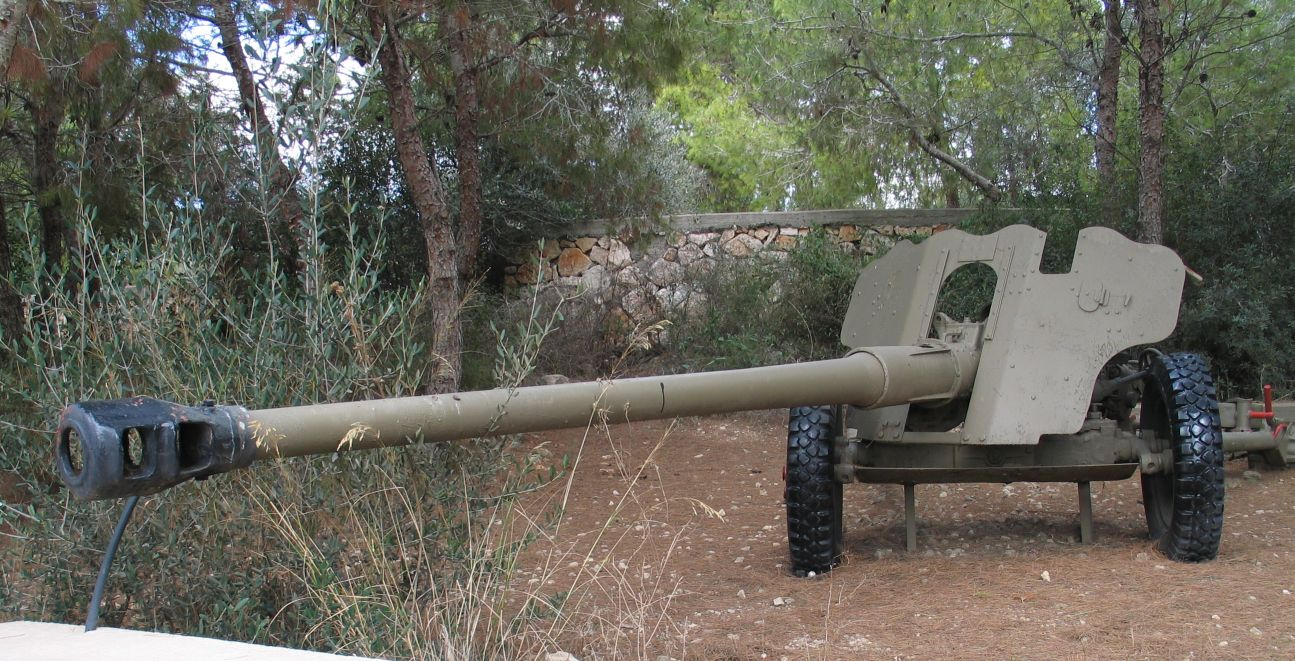
- 85 mm D-44 divisional gun.
- Type: Field gun
- Place of origin: Soviet Union

Service history
- In service: 1946–present
- Wars: Vietnam War; Cambodian Civil War; Lebanese Civil War; Ethiopian Civil War; Iran–Iraq War; First Nagorno-Karabakh War; War in Donbas; Second Nagorno-Karabakh War; Russian invasion of Ukraine

Production history
- Designed: 1943–1944
- Manufacturer: Uralmash
- Produced: 1946–1954
- No. built: 10,918
- Variants: D-44N; SD-44; Chinese Type 56

Specifications
- Mass: D-44: 1,725 kg (3,803 lbs); SD-44: 2,250 kg (4,960 lbs)
- Length: 8.34 metres (27 ft 4 in)
- Barrel length: 4.7 m (15 ft 5 in) 55 calibers
- Width: 1.78 metres (5 ft 10 in)
- Height: 1.42 metres (4 ft 8 in)
- Crew: 8
- Shell: Fixed QF 85×629 mm. R (R/112mm)
- Caliber: 85 mm (3.34 in)
- Breech: Semi-automatic vertical sliding-wedge
- Recoil: Hydro-pneumatic
- Carriage: Split trail
- Elevation: −7° to 35°
- Traverse: 54°
- Rate of fire: up to 20 rounds per minute (burst)
- Muzzle velocity: 1,030 m/s (3,379 ft/s)
- Effective firing range: 1,150 m (1,257 yds) (HVAP-T)
- Maximum firing range: 15.65 km (9.72 mi)
- Sights: OP-2-7 w/5.5X Magnification

The 85-mm divisional gun D-44 (Russian: 85-мм дивизионная пушка Д-44) was a Soviet divisional 85-mm calibre field artillery gun used in the last action of World War II. It was designed as the replacement for the 76 mm divisional gun M1942 (ZiS-3). The gun was no longer in front-line service with the Russian Ground Forces, until being pressed back into service in the Russo-Ukrainian War in 2023. Wartime service included use by communist forces during the Vietnam War and by Arab forces during their conflicts with Israel.

== Overview ==
The design of the D-44 started in 1943 at the design bureau of No.9 factory "Uralmash" and production began in 1944. Its GRAU code was 52-P-367. The SD-44 was a 1950s variant with an auxiliary propulsion unit and ammunition box for 10 rounds, with 697 issued to the airborne forces (VDV) from 1954. The D-44N was a 1960s variant with an APN 3-7 infra-red illumination device for night combat. China received D-44s during the Korean War and began manufacturing a copy, the Type 56, in the early 1960s. Finally, the Polish Army has equipped some of their D-44 guns with electrical subsystems in the early 1980s and designated them D-44M and D-44MN.

The barrel was developed from that of the T-34-85 tank and was capable of firing 20–25 high-explosive (HE), armor-piercing, and high-explosive antitank (HEAT) projectiles per minute. Subcaliber BR-365P HVAP-T (high velocity armor-piercing-tracer) projectiles were capable of penetrating 100 mm of armor at 1000 meters at a ninety-degree obliquity, and the BR-367P HVAP-T projectile penetrates 180 mm of armor under the same conditions. The post-war round O-365K HE weighed 9.5 kg and packed 741 grams of TNT as its bursting charge, while the BK-2M HEAT-FS (fin-stabilized) projectile can penetrate 300 mm of armor. The HEAT round for the Type 56 has a maximum range of 970 meters and will penetrate 100 mm of armor at an angle of 65 degrees.

The gun uses GAZ-AA tires, and is towed by a 2.5t truck or a Ya-12 tractor with the average speed of 20–25 km/h on surfaced roads, and 11 km/h over open terrain, with a maximum towing speed over asphalt roadway of about 55 km/h. The SD-44's auxiliary propulsion unit M-72 of 14 hp can move the gun at road speeds up to 25 km/h.

The gun uses the OP-2-7 sight with 5.5x magnification for day combat. The sight permits target acquisition at 1500 meters.

Performance of D-44 and comparable weapons
Explosive projectiles and range
Weapon	Projectile Weight (Bursting charge), kg	Maximum range, meters
85 mm D-44 (firing O-365K)	9.5 (0.74)	15,650
25 Pounder Mk II (firing HE Mk. I D)	11.33 (0.82)	12,253
8.8 cm FlaK 18 (firing SprGr L4.5)	9.4 (0.87)	14,815
90 mm M3 (firing M71)	10.64 (0.93)	17,337
Data taken from Janes (1982), The American Arsenal, German Artillery of World War Two, and tarrif.net.

== Production ==
The D-44 was produced from 1945 until 1953. During the years 1948-1950, over two thousand D-44s were produced per year. The D-44 also served as the basis from which the 85 mm antitank gun D-48 was developed and also the RPU-14 multiple rocket launcher uses the D-44's carriage.

== Use by other nations ==
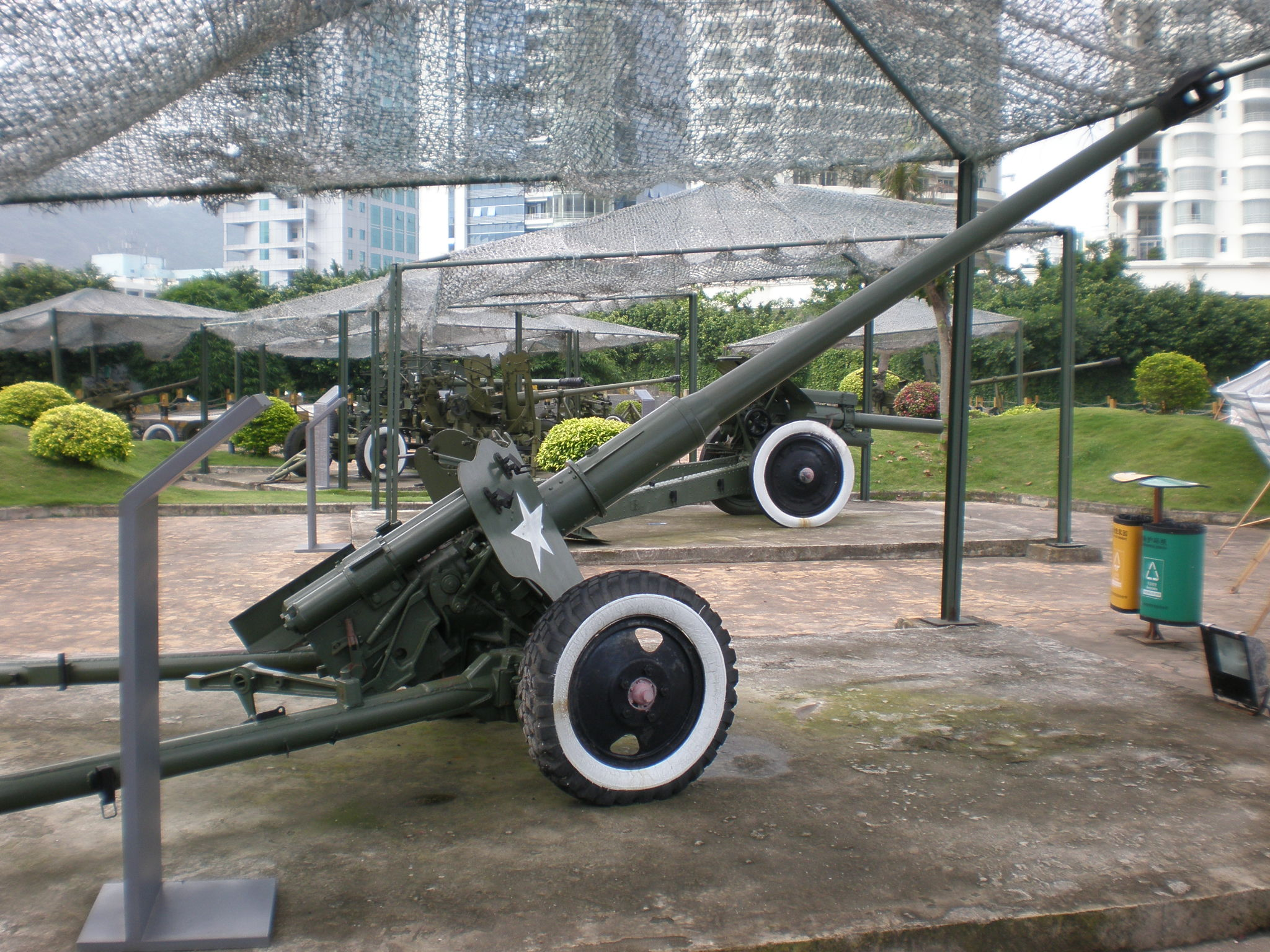
Type 56, PLA D-44 variant

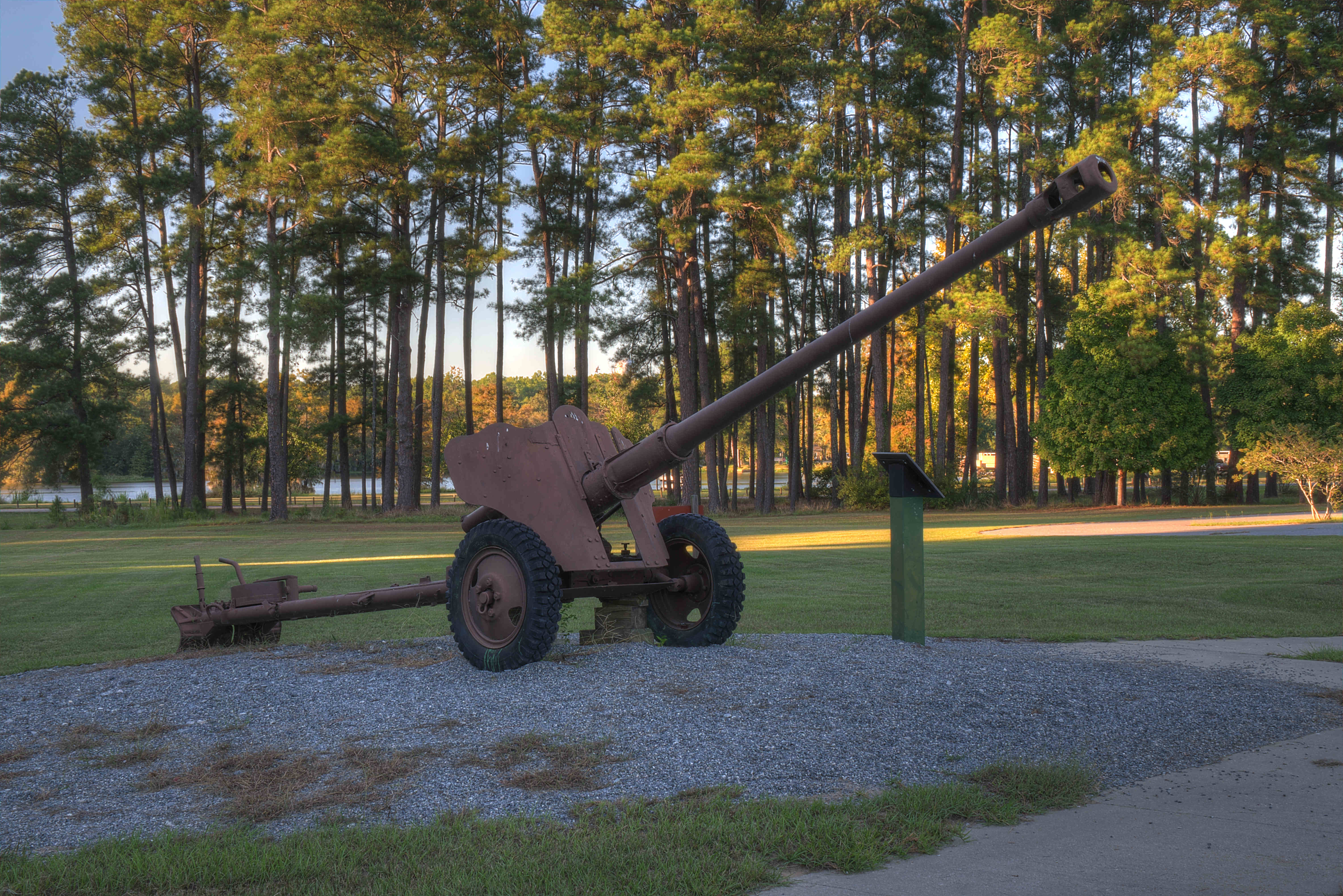
D-44 on display at Georgia Veterans State Park

By the 1950s, the D-44 had been exported for use by Warsaw Pact nations, with the gun remaining in service with the East German National People's Army until the fall of East Germany. Besides East Germany, other users include(d) Albania, Algeria, Armenia, Azerbaijan, Bulgaria, Cambodia, China (Type 56), Cuba, Egypt, Georgia, Guinea, Guinea-Bissau, Hungary, Iran, Iraq, North Korea, Laos, Mali, Morocco, Mozambique, Poland, Romania, Somalia, Sri Lanka, Sudan, Syria, Vietnam and Zambia

== Operational history ==
Russia has deployed D-44s in Ukraine. With one being destroyed by a Ukrainian drone on 27 September 2023 according to footage posted online. Previous footage has shown a D-44 being mounted on a tractor as a tank destroyer used by Ukraine in fighting near Kreminna.

=== Current users ===
- Armenia – 35 in service.
- Azerbaijan – 100 in service.
- Bulgaria – 150 in storage.
- Cuba – Unknown number in service.
- Democratic Republic of the Congo – 10 Type 56 in service.
- Eritrea – Unknown number in service.
  - Tigray Defense Forces
- Ethiopia – Unknown number of Type 56 service.
- Georgia – Unknown number in service.
- Guinea – 6 in service.
- Guinea-Bissau – 8 in service.
- Mali – Unknown number in service
- Mongolia – Unknown number of D-44 and D-48 in service.
- Mozambique – 12 Type 56 in service.
- Russia
- Sudan – Unknown number in service.
- Tanzania – 75 Type 56 in service.
- Transnistria
- Ukraine – Unknown number in service.
- Vietnam – Unknown number in service.
- Yemen
- Somaliland: 27 in service

=== Former users ===
- Albania
- Algeria – last reported as having 80 in service in 2019.
- China
- East Germany
- Iraq
- Iran
- ISIS – 1 captured in Syria.
- North Vietnam – Used during Vietnam War.
- Pakistan – estimated 200 Type 56.
- Polish People's Republic – Used by Polish People's Army used during World War II and post war.
- Romania
- Sri Lanka – Retired and replaced by 122 mm Type 60 field guns
- Somalia – Status unknown.
- Soviet Union

== See also ==
- 85 mm vz. 52 – A similar Czech gun which used the same ammunition.
