= Teruel (multiple rocket launcher) =

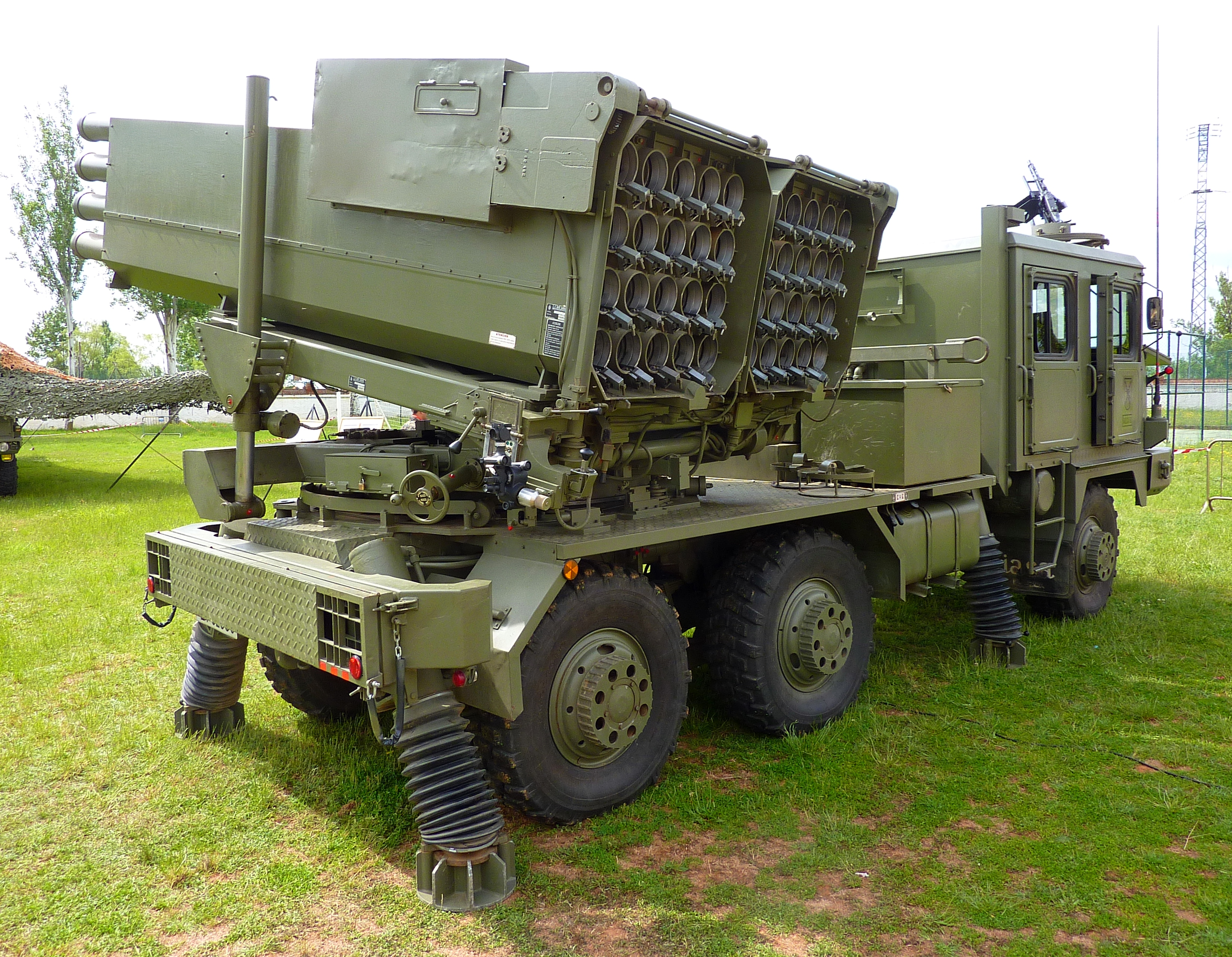
A Teruel system in 2010

The Teruel multiple rocket launcher was in service with the Spanish Army between 1985 and 2011. This system is capable of launching 140mm artillery rockets from 40 launch tubes in less than 30 seconds. It is mounted on a Pegaso truck.

Before firing, stabilizing jacks must be lowered and the blast shield raised to protect the cab and its occupants. Rockets can be fired out to a range of 25 kilometres.

== Operators ==
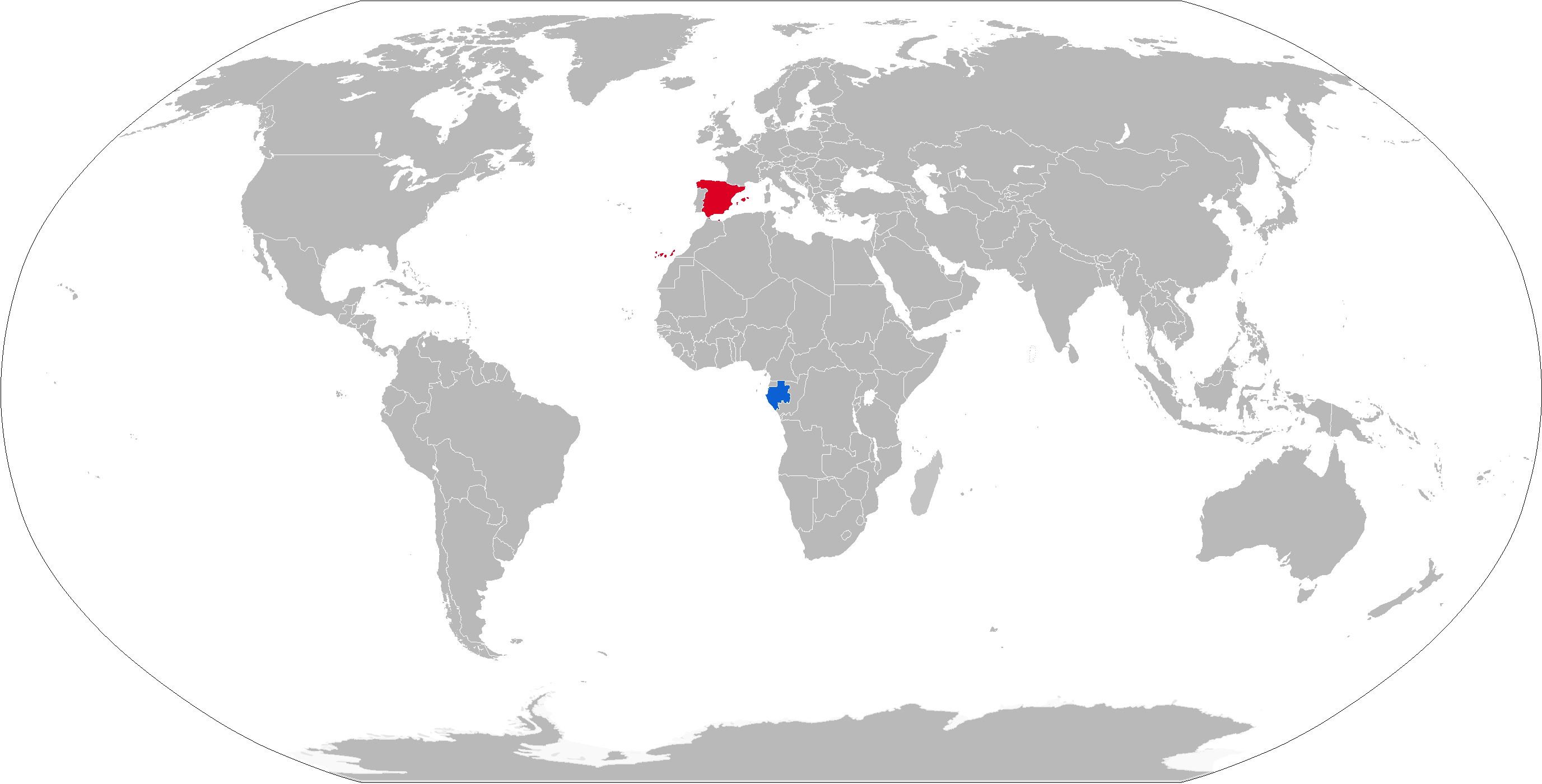
Map with Teruel MRL operators in blue and former operators in red

=== Current operators ===
- Gabon: 8

=== Former operators ===
- Spain: 14

== See also ==
- RM-70
- Katyusha, BM-13, BM-8, and BM-31 multiple rocket launchers of World War II
- BM-14 140mm multiple rocket launcher
- BM-21 122mm multiple rocket launcher
- List of armoured fighting vehicles by country
