= 85 mm vz. 52 =

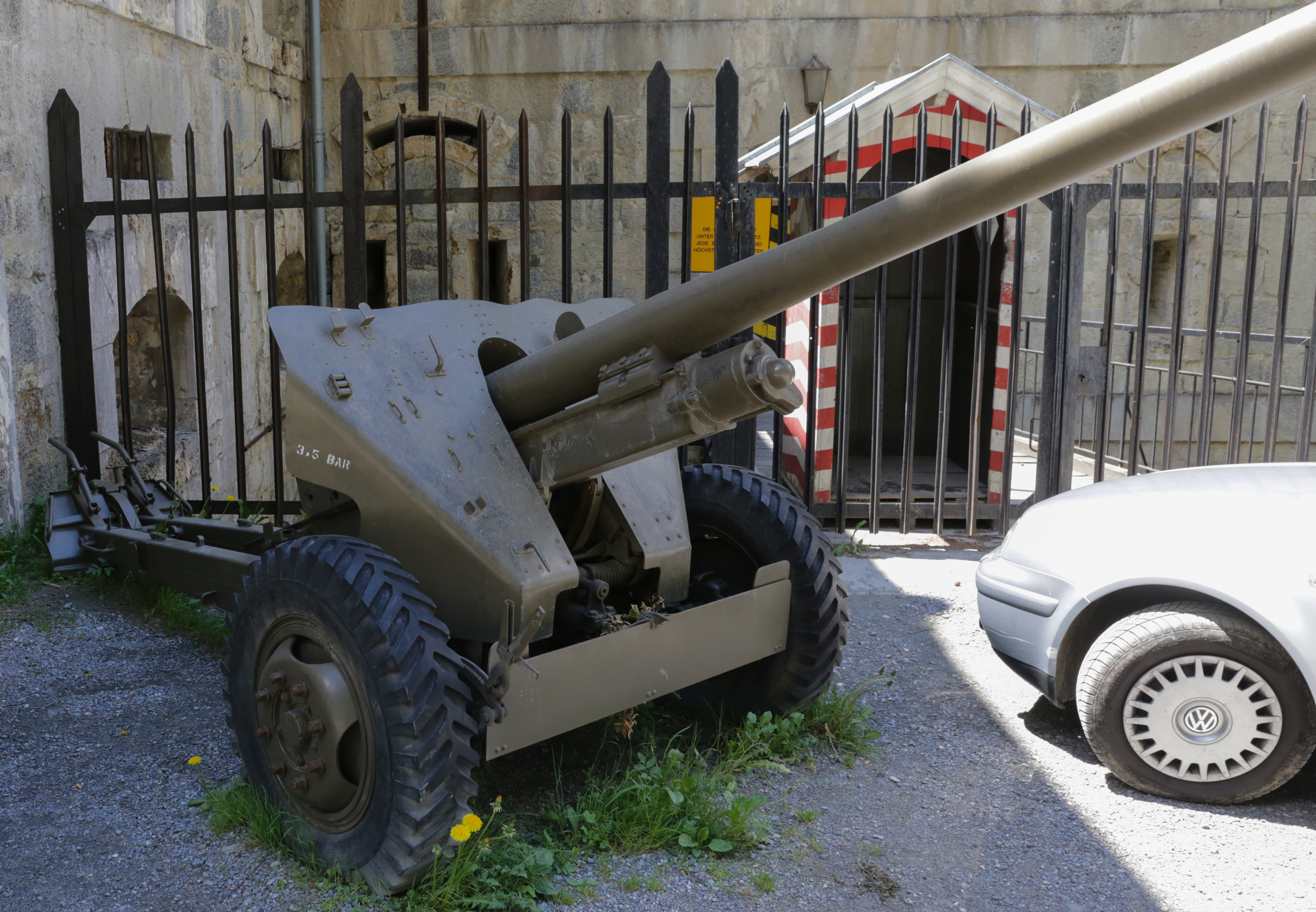
- An Austrian vz. 52 on display at the Nauders Fortress.
- Type: Field gun Anti-tank gun
- Place of origin: Czechoslovak Socialist Republic

Service history
- Used by: Czechoslovakia; Austria; East Germany

Production history
- Designer: Škoda
- Designed: 1952
- Manufacturer: Škoda

Specifications
- Mass: 2,095 kg (4,619 lb)
- Length: 7.5 m (24 ft 7 in)
- Barrel length: 5.07 m (17 ft) L/60 (with muzzle brake)
- Width: 1.9 m (6 ft 3 in)
- Height: 1.5 m (4 ft 11 in)
- Crew: 7
- Shell: Fixed QF 85 × 629 mm R
- Caliber: 85 mm (3.3 in)
- Breech: Semi-automatic vertical sliding-wedge
- Recoil: Hydro-pneumatic
- Carriage: Split-trail
- Elevation: -6° to +38°
- Traverse: 60°
- Rate of fire: 20 rpm
- Muzzle velocity: HVAP: 1,070 m/s (3,500 ft/s); APHE: 820 m/s (2,700 ft/s); HE: 805 m/s (2,640 ft/s)
- Maximum firing range: 16 km (10 mi)

The 85 mm vz. 52 was a dual-purpose field gun and anti-tank gun designed and produced for the Czechoslovak Army during the 1950s.

== History ==
When Czechoslovakia was created with the dissolution of the Austro-Hungarian Empire after World War I it inherited a large and capable arms manufacturing industry. This allowed the new state to both design and produce its own weapons for domestic use and for export. After World War II this design and manufacturing experience allowed Czechoslovakia to not only produce Soviet designs under license but to produce equipment for its own use and for export to its Warsaw Pact allies. A consequence of its membership in the Warsaw Pact was that the military hardware it produced used Soviet-caliber ammunition. This standardization was also pursued by NATO members, but with their own calibers of ammunition.

== Design ==
Design and development of the vz. 52 began in 1948 at the Škoda Works in Plzeň under the company designation of A22. The vz.52 was designed to fill the same roles as the Soviet 85 mm divisional gun D-44 and used the same ammunition. Its performance was similar to that of the D44 but since it was a unique design it had different dimensions.

Similarities
- Fixed QF 85 x 692 mm R ammunition
- Split-trail carriage
- Muzzle brake
- Semi-automatic vertical sliding-wedge breech
- Gun shield
- Hydro-pneumatic recoil system

Differences

- Weight
- Length
- Barrel length
- Single tires
- Elevation
- Traverse

Ammunition
Type	Model	Weight	Penetration
HVAP	BR-365P	5 kg (11 lb)	107 mm (4 in) at 1,000 m (1,094 yd)
APHE		9.3 kg (20 lb 8 oz)	123 mm (5 in) at 1,000 m (1,094 yd)
High Explosive	O-365K	9.5 kg (20 lb 15 oz)	?
High Explosive Anti-tank	BK-2M	?	300 mm (12 in) at 900 m (984 yd)
