= Nexter Aravis =

Aravis
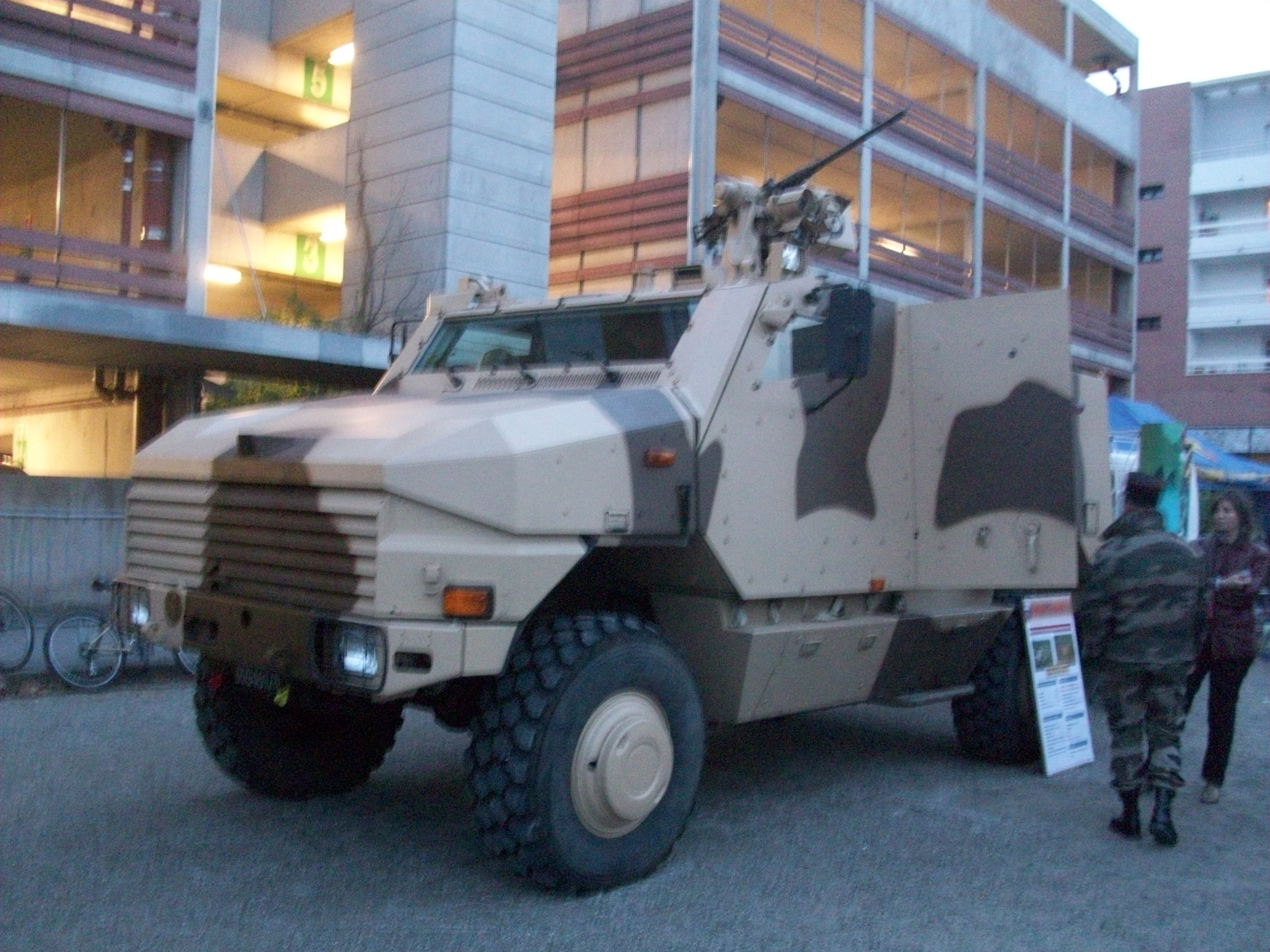
- A Nexter Aravis on display with a machine gun mounted on top
- Type: Mine-Resistant Ambush Protected Vehicle
- Place of origin: France

Service history
- Used by: France
- Wars: War in Afghanistan; 2019 Gabonese coup d'état attempt Battle of Baghuz

Production history
- Manufacturer: Nexter
- Produced: 2009-present

Specifications
- Mass: 12.5 t (13.8 short tons)
- Length: 6 m (20 ft)
- Width: 2.5 m (8.2 ft)
- Height: 2.5 m (8.2 ft)
- Crew: 2-6
- Main armament: Remote weapon station (varies by customer/requirement)
- Engine: Mercedes-Benz OM 924; 218 hp (163 kW)
- Transmission: Automatic
- Operational range: 750 km (470 mi)
- Maximum speed: 100 km/h (62 mph)

The Aravis is a mine-resistant ambush protected vehicle developed and built by French company Nexter. An order for 15 Aravis vehicles was placed by the Délégation Générale pour l'Armement in April 2009 for use by the French Army as a reconnaissance and escort vehicle for engineer units. Deliveries for the initial order began in January 2010.

== Design ==
The Aravis' chassis is based on the Unimog U5000 chassis. The total internal volume for the vehicle is 9.5m^{3} with 8m^{3} of that under full armoured protection. The Aravis can be equipped for a variety of roles, including patrol vehicle, ambulance, and command and control vehicle.

=== Protection ===
The Aravis was designed with protection against mines, improvised explosive devices, 14.5mm anti-armour rounds, and 155mm artillery bursts in mind, meeting full STANAG 4596 Level 4 specifications. Like many other mine-protected vehicles, the Aravis was built with a V-hull intended to deflect as much energy as possible from detonations beneath the vehicle away from the vehicle. Nexter has patented the modular hull armour used on the Aravis under the name "Safepro". The vehicle has survived detonations of 50 kg (110 lb) of TNT at a distance of 5 m (16 ft) in testing.

=== Armament ===
The Aravis' primary armament is housed in a remote weapon station. Armament can vary based on the customer's specifications, but the vehicle has been displayed with a Selex 12.7mm machine gun mount, and Nexter has developed the ARX 20 remote weapon station, which features a 20mm M621 cannon, for use with the Aravis. The ARX 20 can also be fitted with the Pilar anti-sniper system.

=== Mobility ===
The Aravis is capable of speeds of up to 100 km/h on roads, and is said to have a "high standard of cross-country and urban maneoeuvring capability". Without preparation, the vehicle can ford up 1m of water. The Aravis uses are Michelin 365/80R 20 152 K with run-flat and central tire inflation systems. In terms of strategic and operational mobility, the vehicle is transportable by aircraft equivalent to the C-130 Hercules or larger.

== Operational history ==
The French Army deployed 11 Aravis in Afghanistan (from 2010 to the French departure) and, from 2016, 6 of them in Mali, as part of the Operation Barkhane. In both cases they were used by Génie (Military engineering) units for route clearance. An Aravis of the French Army was also spotted in Syria during the Deir ez-Zor campaign.

The Nexter Aravis is known to be used in the 2019 Gabonese coup d'état attempt by Gabonese Republican Guard forces to take on rogue Gabonese soldiers.

== Operators ==
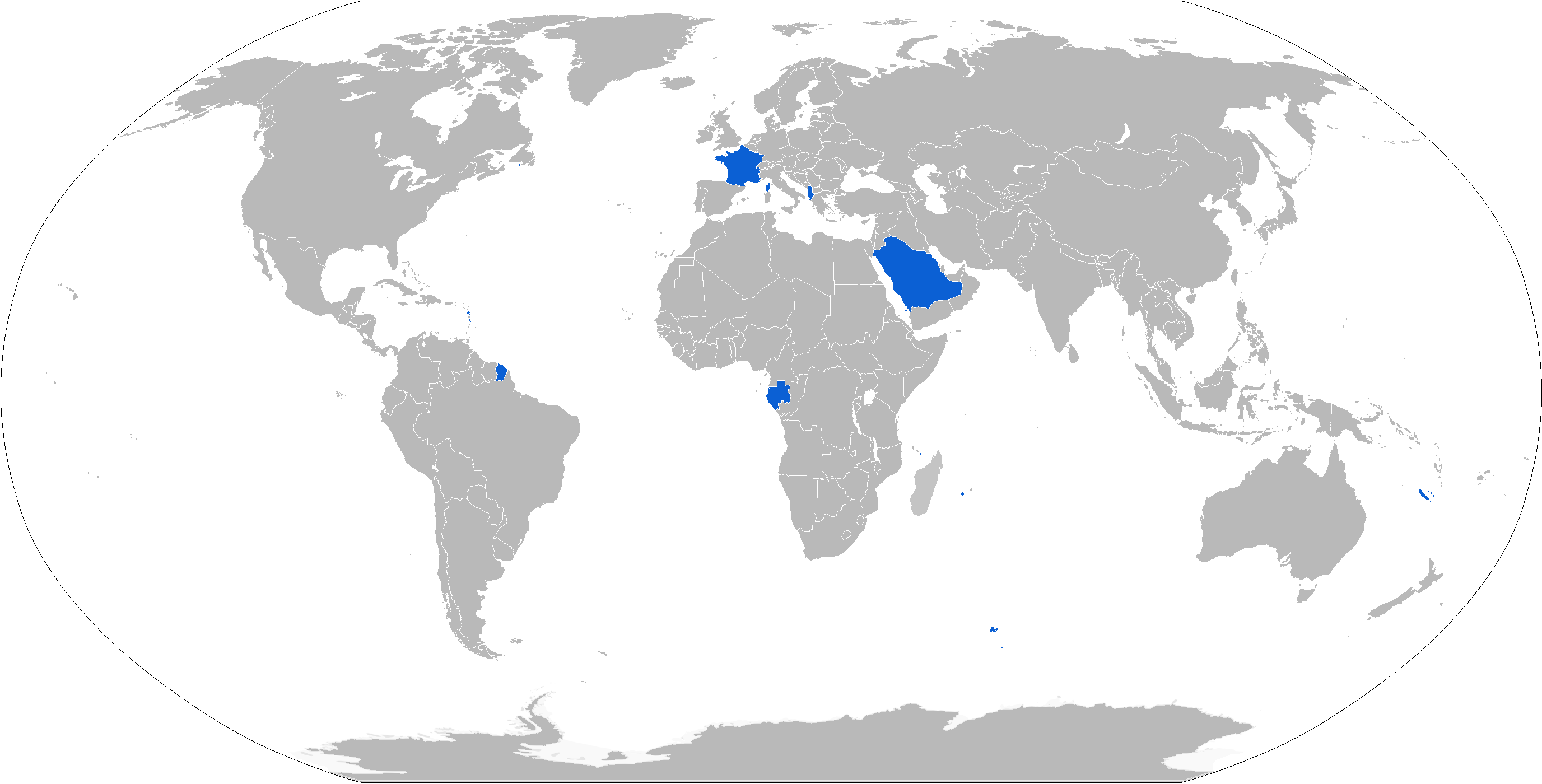
Map with Aravis operators in blue

- (Albania) Albanian Land Force - soldiers of various units tested the Aravis in 2012 but an unknown amount was bought.
- (France) French Army – 15, known as Véhicule Blindé Hautement Protégé, highly protected armored vehicle.
- Armed Forces of Gabon – 12 ordered but only 8 delivered due to budget reasons, armed with 20mm cannons in RWS stations.
- (Saudi Arabia) Saudi Arabian Army – 73 with 20mm canons were ordered in 2011 and 191 more in 2012. This order of 264 APCs, intended for the Saudi Arabian National Guard, was blocked in 2012 by Germany but all of them were delivered between 2013 and 2016.
