= Sibselmash (company) =

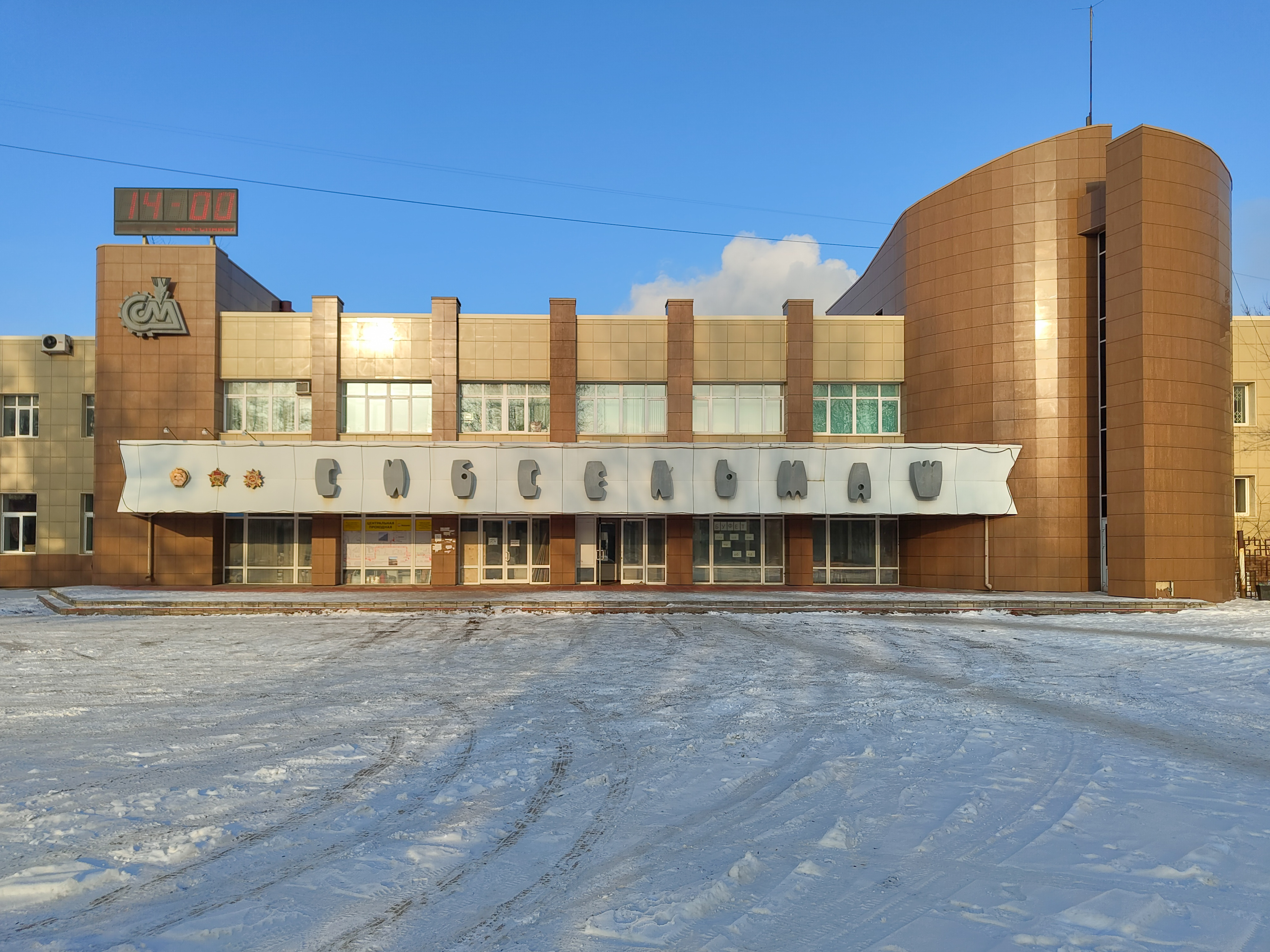
- Type: Open Joint Stock Company
- Founded: 1929
- Headquarters: Novosibirsk, Russia
- Parent: Rostec

Sibselmash (Russian: Сибсельмаш) is a company based in Novosibirsk, Russia. It is currently part of the Rostec group.

== History ==
Sibselmash was established in the 1930s as Kombinat 179 to produce agricultural machinery. During World War II, the factory was converted to shell production, manufacturing 48 million shells during wartime.

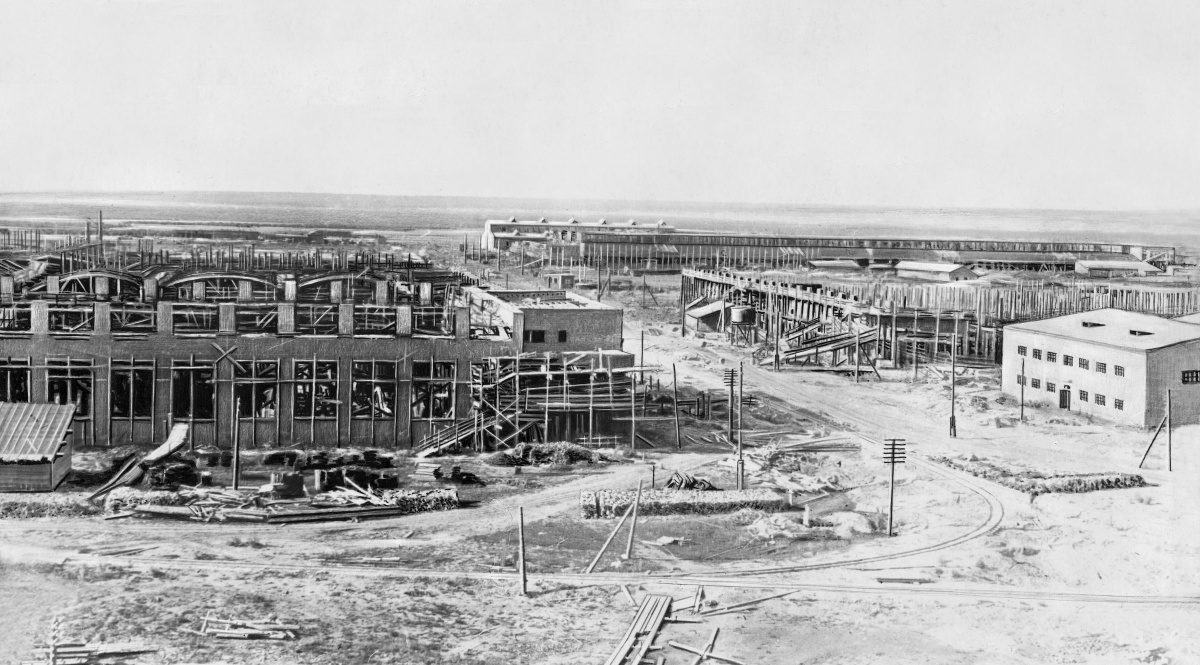
Plant construction, 1930

Woman working on plant construction, June 1931

== Products ==
Sibselmash has produced light ammunition and small rockets for the military. It also produces agricultural machinery for the civilian economy. The company entered bankruptcy proceedings in 2012.

== Owners and management ==
=== Owners ===
As of 2007, the owner of 100% of the shares was Federal Agency for State Property Management. According to the decree of the President of the Russian Federation dated July 10, 2008, it transferred the shares of the NGO Sibselmash to Rostec Group, which in August 2011 transferred control of the production association to Prominvest Management Company.

=== Directors ===
- Alexandr Morin (1929–1931) — head of construction and director of the Sibcombine factory
- D. M. Obukhov (1931–1932) — director of the Sibcombine factory
- P. S. Shirokov (1932) — director of the Sibtextilmashstroy factory
- Yu. Kerges (1932–1933) — director of the Sibmetallstroy factory
- Ja. L. Askoldov (1933–1936) — director of the Sibmetallstroy factory and the Urga 179 plant
- A. V. Belov (1936–1937) — director of the harvester apostille 179
- A. V. Zakharov (1937–1939) — director of the harvester apostille 179
- Parfenov (1940) — director of plant no. 179
- Ivan Yakushev (1940–1941) — director of combine no. 179
- Alexey Novikov (1941) — director of combine no. 179
- Grigory Sharkov (1941) — director of combine no. 179
- Methodius Klavsut (1941–1942) — director of combine no. 179
- Ivan Dmitrievich Demidov (1941–1943) - Chief Engineer of plant no. 179
- Anatoly Sakhanitsky (1943–1946) — Director of plant no. 179
- E. D. Berdichevsky (1946–1947) — Director of plant no. 179
- Valentin Zabaluev (1947–1957) — Director of plant no. 179
- N. I. Sergeev (1957–1960) — Director of the Sibselmash plant
- P. E. Bazunov (1960–1961) — Director of the Sibselmash plant
- Konstantin Myshkov (1961–1969) — Director of the Sibselmash plant
- Fedor Yakovlevich Kotov (1969–1976) — Director of the Sibselmash plant
- O. V. Kuznetsov (1976–1979) — General Director of the Sibselmash plant and Software
- S. N. Sokolov (1979–1982) — General Director of Sibselmash
- Vitaly Mukha (1982–1988) — CEO of Sibselmash
- Viktor Kuleshov (1988–2001) — General Director of FSUE Sibselmash
- Vasily Yurchenko (2002 – January 2004) — General Director of FSUE NPO Sibselmash (since 2003 — JSC)
- Oleg Utiralov (January 2004 — 27 August 2007) — General Director of JSC NPO Sibselmash
- Oleg Kostochkin (28 August 2007 — 30 March 2009) — General Director of JSC NPO Sibselmash
- Vladimir Ignatovsky (30 March 2009 — March 2010) — General Director of JSC NPO Sibselmash
- Gennady Grebenshchikov (March 2010 — 24 August 2011) — General Director of JSC NPO Sibselmash
- Alexander Gorbunov (since 24 August 2011) — Chairman of the Board of Sibselmash, Managing Director of the company from Prominvest Management Company

== Awards ==
- Order of Lenin (September 23, 1943) — "For exemplary performance of government tasks during the war years".
- Order of the Patriotic War I degree (June 28, 1945) — "For outstanding contribution to the fulfillment of defense orders of the Motherland".
- Order of the October Revolution (March 30, 1971) — "For the successful implementation of the five-year plan (1965–1970) and the organization of production of new equipment".

== Conflicts ==
In October 2000 the local department of the FSSP arrested a detached house of life from the enterprise for debts. The two-storey building, with a total area of almost 2,500 m^{2} (27,000 sq ft), was completed a month later. According to the then-management of the plant, the valuation of the building at 1,800,000 rubles was too low, and the sale (to the local company Byte) was illegal, since it had a mobilization purpose. After the implementation, the management appealed to both Rosvooruzhenie and the chief bailiff of the Russian Federation, and also tried to appeal the sale through the Leninsky district court. However, in the end nothing changed – answers came with support and sympathy, but the arrest was not lifted. The authorities said that if there were violations, they were not so significant. In addition, there are no norms in Russian legislation prohibiting the seizure and sale of mobilization facilities for debts. In 2007 as a result of a comprehensive inspection of the NGO Sibselmash by Rostechnadzor authorities, about 10 thousand tons of harmful industrial waste were identified on its territory. In 2008 Rostechnadzor authorities included the association in the "list of the six worst enterprises in Siberia in terms of industrial and environmental safety."

In September 2012 the plant completed the disposal of 650 cylinders of chlorine and ammonia. The cylinders were released in the 1940s, and then buried on the territory of Sibselmash in 1967. The disposal cost the city budget 862 thousand rubles. The cost of disposal includes the purchase of personal protective equipment, purchase of caustic soda, and payment for tractor work.
