= BMD-20 =

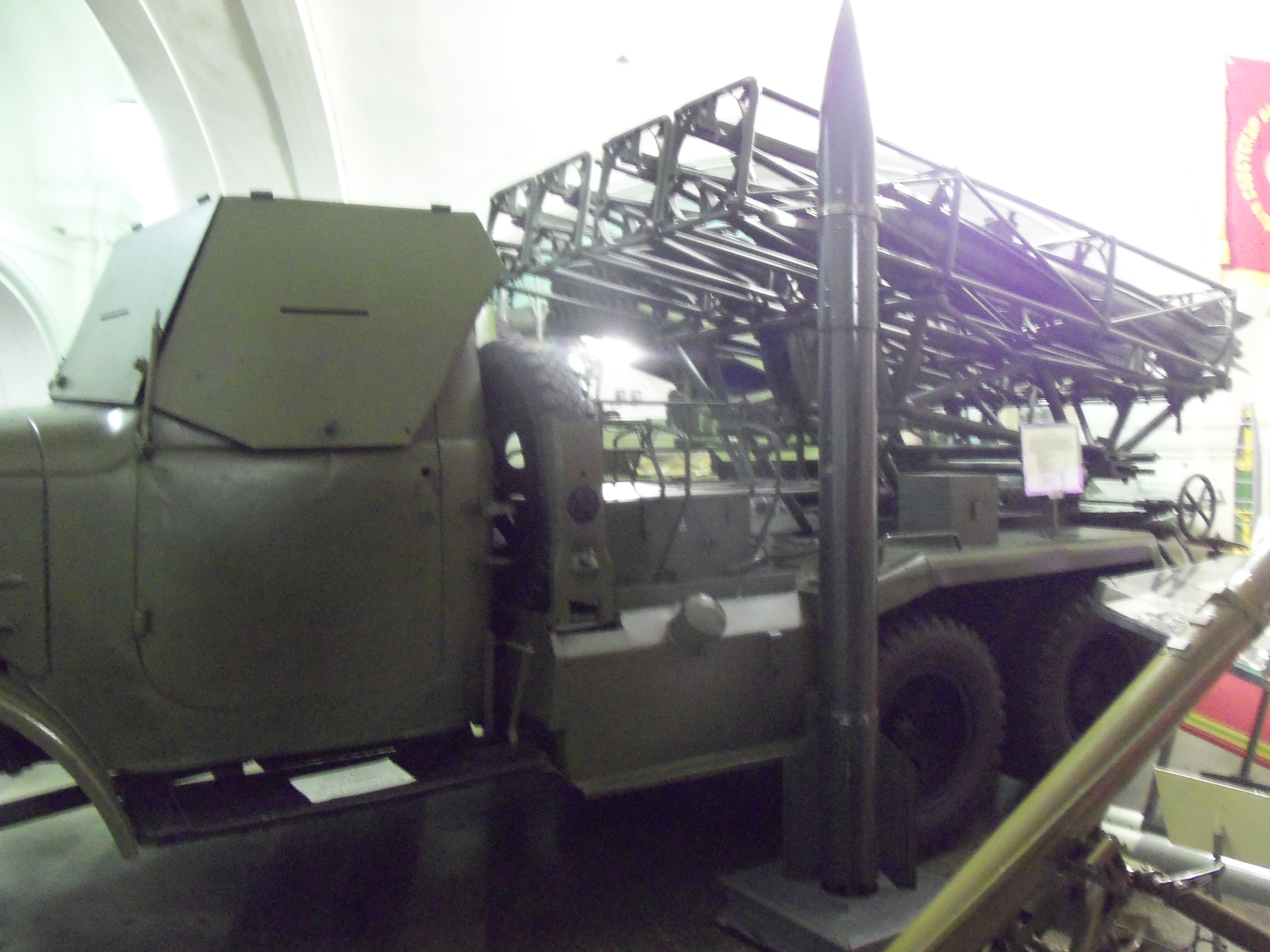
- BMD-20 in Military Historical Museum of Artillery, Engineers and Signal Corps
- Type: Rocket artillery
- Place of origin: Soviet Union

Service history
- In service: 1952–1970s

Production history
- Designed: 1947–1951
- Produced: 1952–late 1950s
- No. built: 4,000

Specifications
- Mass: 8.7 t (9.6 short tons)
- Length: 7.2 m (24 ft)
- Width: 2.3 m (7 ft 7 in)
- Height: 2.85 m (9 ft 4 in)
- Crew: 8
- Caliber: 200 mm
- Rate of fire: 4 in 4–6 sec
- Muzzle velocity: 590 m/s (1,900 ft/s)
- Effective firing range: 19 km (12 mi)
- Engine: 92 hp (69 kW)
- Power/weight: 10.6 hp/t
- Operational range: 520 km (320 mi)
- Maximum speed: 60 km (37 mi)

The BMD-20 (GRAU designation 8U33) was a 200 mm multiple rocket launcher (MRL) created by the Soviet Union.

== Overview ==
Following the success of rocket artillery systems like the Katyusha during World War II, the Soviet Union continued development on such weapons. Development of the BMD-20 began in 1947 and it was accepted into Soviet Army service in 1952. The system was based on a ZIS-151 6×6 truck chassis carrying four rockets in an open steel lattice resting at +9° elevation which could be raised to +60° and traverse 20° to the sides. The launcher is crewed by eight men, three of which are seated inside the cab with the rest seated externally. The windows of the cab are protected by folding metal sheet covers when firing. Once in position, the BMD-20 can be made ready to fire within two minutes.

Each MD-20F 200 mm fin stabilized rocket measured 3.05 m (10.0 ft) long and weighed 194 kg (428 lb) with a 30 kg (66 lb) high explosive warhead. They had a maximum range of 19 km (12 mi) and could all be fired in 4-6 seconds. Accompanied by a reloading vehicle, the launcher took five men 6-10 minutes to reload manually, which usually happened at another location away from the firing position to avoid counter battery fire. Although powerful, the rockets were not accurate, dispersing 90-210 meters from each other, so multiple launchers were intended to be used at once to bombard a large area.

== Service ==
The BMD-20 entered service with the Soviet Union in 1952 and remained in production to the end of the decade with 4,000 systems produced. It was in use until the mid-1970s when it was replaced by the BM-27 Uragan. Unlike other Soviet artillery systems, it was not widely exported. It was exported to Ethiopia, who used them until the late 1980s, as well as Cuba.

North Korea received 200 BMD-20s in the mid-1950s and still has the weapon in service. The rockets are mounted on the ZiL-157 truck and naval launchers, mounting eight on patrol boats.
