= National Gendarmerie of Gabon =

National Gendarmerie of Gabon Gendarmerie nationale gabonaise

Agency overview
- Formed: March 10, 1960
- Preceding agency: Libreville Gendarmerie Detachment, Gendarmerie Nationale

Jurisdictional structure
- Operations jurisdiction: Gabon
- General nature: Gendarmerie

Operational structure
- Agency executive: Yves Barrasouaga, Brigadier General
- Child agency: Gabonese Republican Guard

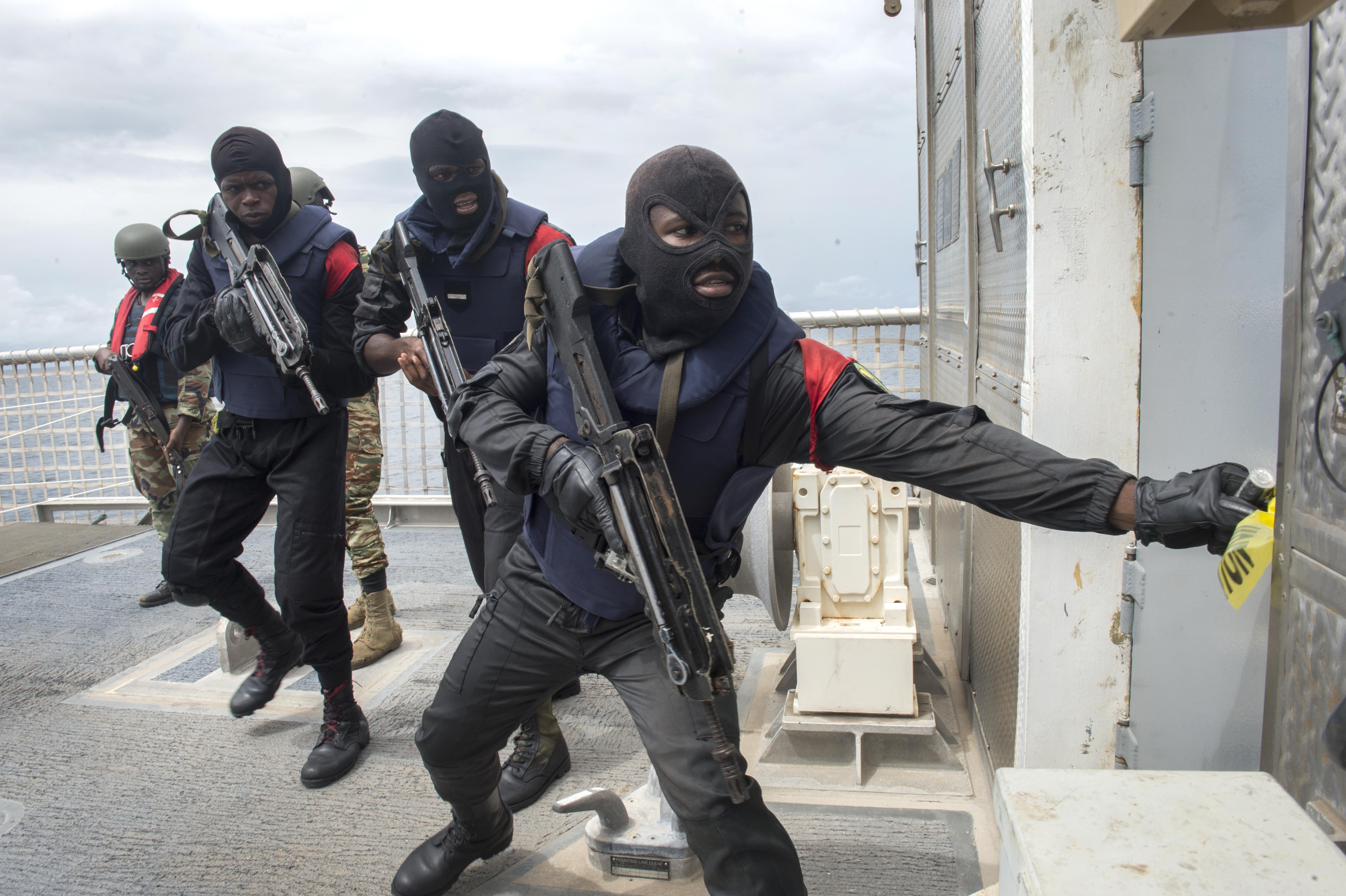
Gabonese sailors and personnel from the National Gendarmerie during a training mission.

The National Gendarmerie of Gabon (French: Gendarmerie nationale gabonaise) is the national police force of Gabon responsible for law enforcement in Gabon. It is under the direct command of the President of Gabon. The Gendarmerie is also in charge of the Gabonese Republican Guard.

The main tasks of the gendarmerie are to defend the country's borders, ensure public safety, and to enforce actions taken by judicial and government authorities.

== History ==
The National Gendarmerie was formed on March 10, 1960 when Gabon, formerly French Equatorial Africa, gained its independence from France. This was done under the statutory order n° 19/PM of December 30, 1960. It originated from the Libreville Gendarmerie Detachment that was founded in 1929.

The unit was at the time commanded by Governor General of French Equatorial Africa, Félix Eboue.

An intensification of the "Gabonisation" of the service took place in 1964, the unit being established by French gendarmes working alongside the newly independent Gabonese government.

In 1970, the National Gendarmerie became Gabonese in all the levels of the hierarchy. It is governed by the decrees of 27 April 1982 and 14 January 1983 regulating the organization of the national gendarmerie.

In 2009, it was reported that the GNG had 2,000 gendarmes.

In 2019, Gabonese gendarmes have been trained by Green Beret commandos under sponsorship of the American Embassy. During the 2019 Gabonese coup d'état attempt, Gabonese news reported that the GNG GIGN was involvement in raiding the Radio Télévision Gabonaise building taken by rogue Gabonese forces.

On April 3, 2020, Brigadier General Barrasouaga was appointed as the GNG commander.

== Organization ==
The GNG is composed of the following as of 2020:

=== Central Organization ===
- High Command
- Technical Inspection
- General Direction of Organization and Staffs (GDOS)
- General Direction of Administrative and Financial Services (GDAFS)
- General Direction of Technical Services (GDTS)
- General Direction of the Materials (GDMAT)
- Headquarters Units Grouping
- General Direction of Schools
- Researches General Direction

=== Territorial organization ===
- 5 gendarmerie departmental regions in several provinces known as "Legions"
  - East Legion
  - West Legion
  - Midwest
  - North
  - South
- 9 squads ("Groupement" in French)
- Territorial Companies
- Territorial Brigades

=== Special Units ===
The Gendarmerie "anti-riot police" is organized into the various legions and groupings. A mixed armoured squadron known as the National Gendarmerie Intervention and Security grouping (NGISG), the Security and Honours Grouping, the Military Police Grouping. It also maintains nautical units, air transport brigade and motorcycle brigades.

=== Training ===
In 1963, it trained its first official gendarmes and sent the first officer to the Officer school ("Ecole des Officiers de la Gendarmerie Nationale" or EOGN in French) the following year in Melun in France.

== List of heads ==
The following is a list heads of the National Gendarmerie since 1964:

- Lieutenant Colonel Piette (1964–1967)
- Lieutenant Colonel Maitrier (1967–1969)
- General Nkoma Georges (1969–1979)
- General Nzong André (1979–1990)
- General Mamiaka Raphael (1990–1994)
- General Doumbeneny Jean Pierre (1994–2002)
- General Olery Honoré (2002–2008)
- General Sougou Abel (2008–2012)
- General Ekoua Jean (2012–2020)
- General Yves Barrasouaga (2020–present)
