= Law enforcement in Gabon =

Responsibility for enforcing the law in Gabon is in the hands of the National Gendarmerie of Gabon. In 2007, the United States House Committee on Foreign Affairs investigated reports that Gabonese police officers occasionally beat confessions out of prisoners, as well as beat, rob, and rape prostitutes. Gabonese police clashed with opposition protesters in Libreville in 2005 and 2011. The police is part of the national military, and places emphasis on the police's internal work, and not offensive actions.

- National Police Force of Gabon
