= Type 63 multiple rocket launcher =

Type of multiple rocket launcher

Type 63 107mm rocket launcher
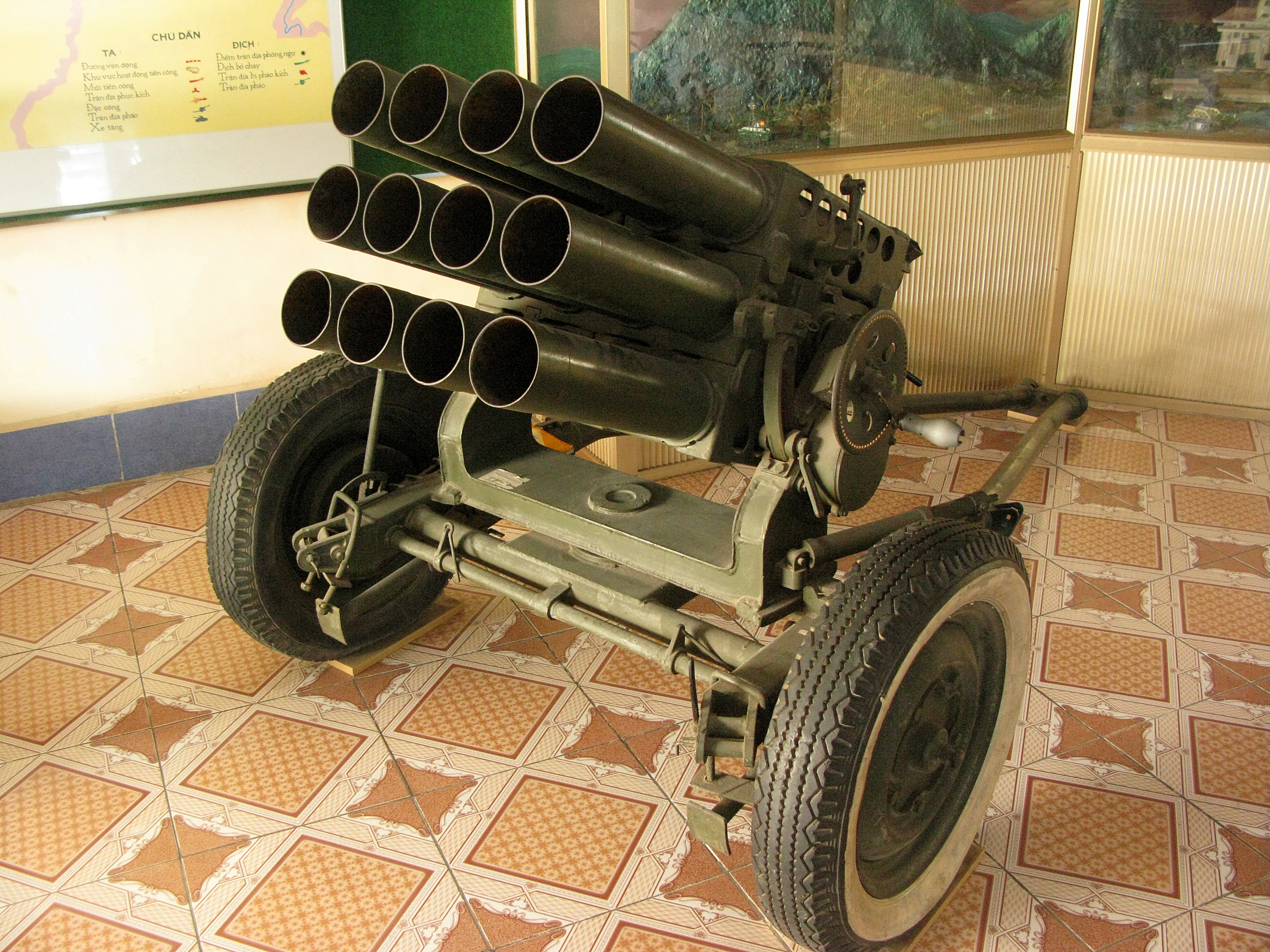
- Type 63 rocket launcher
- Type: Multiple rocket launcher
- Place of origin: China

Service history
- Used by: See Operators
- Wars: Vietnam War; Lebanese Civil War; Sino–Vietnamese War; Soviet-Afghan war; Iran–Iraq War; KDPI insurgency (1989-1996); Second Sudanese Civil War; Yugoslav Wars; Iraq War; Iraqi insurgency; Somali Civil War; First Libyan Civil War; Central African Civil War; Syrian Civil War; South Sudanese Civil War; War in Iraq (2013-17); Second Libyan Civil War; Russo-Ukrainian War; Russian invasion of Ukraine; Tigray War; Sudanese civil war (2023–present); Gaza war

Production history
- Designed: 1961
- Manufacturer: State Factory 847
- Produced: 1963–?
- Variants: Type 81 SP version on truck

Specifications
- Mass: 602 kg (1,327 lb)
- Length: 2.90 m (9 ft 6 in)
- Width: 1.65 m (5 ft 5 in)
- Height: 0.91 m (3 ft)
- Crew: 5
- Shell: HE, HE-I and HE-frag
- Caliber: 106.7mm
- Carriage: Split trail
- Elevation: −3° to +57°
- Traverse: 32°
- Muzzle velocity: 385 m/s (1,260 ft/s)
- Maximum firing range: 8.05 km (5 mi)

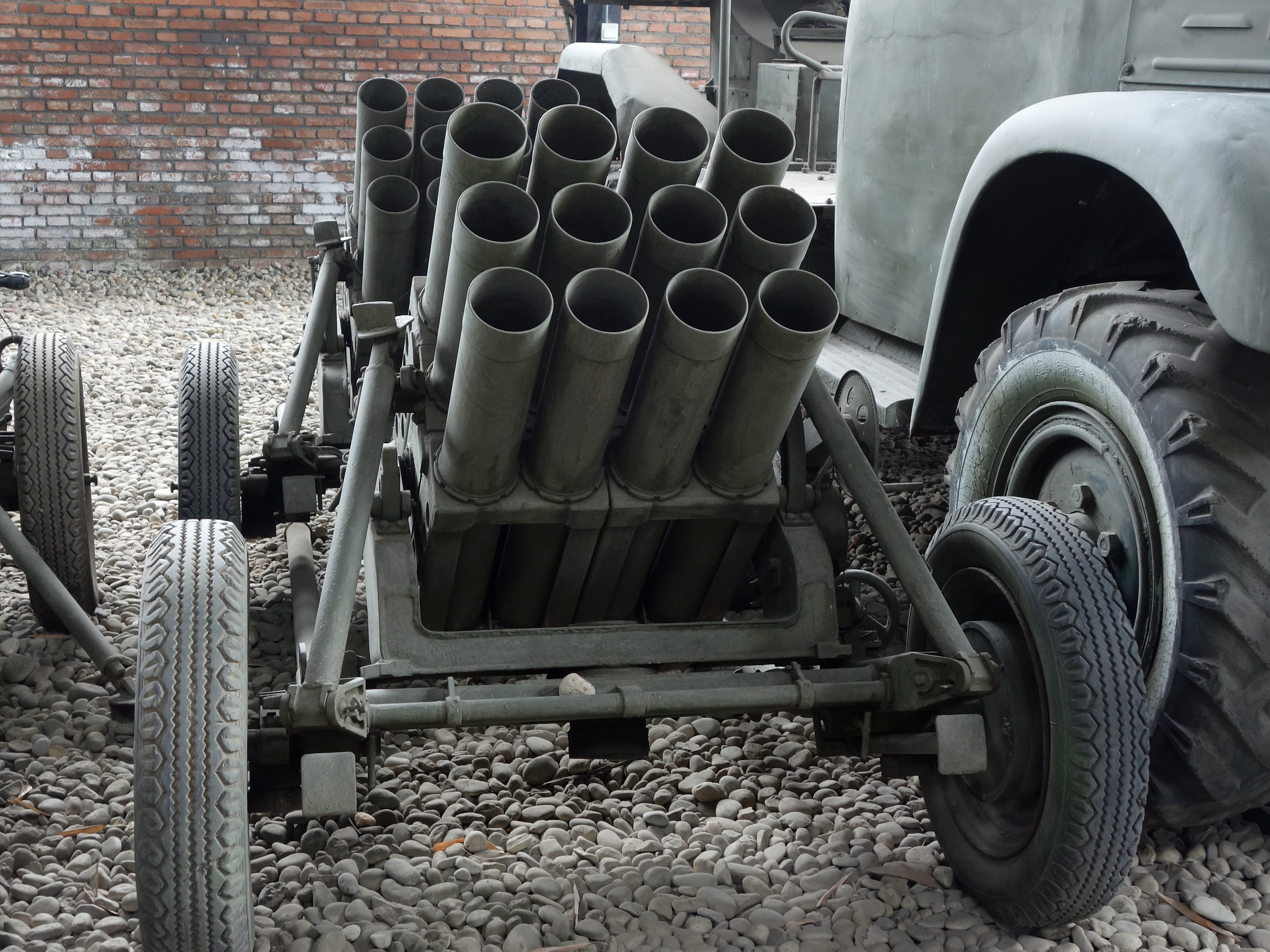
Type 63 107mm multiple rocket launcher.

The Type 63 multiple rocket launcher is a towed, 12-tube, 107mm rocket launcher produced by the People's Republic of China in the early 1960s and later exported and manufactured globally. Although no longer serving with active infantry units, the Type 63 is still in People's Liberation Army service with specialized formations such as mountain infantry units and special forces detachments. The Type 63 was widely used in the PLA until the late 1980s. It was adopted as the successor of the Type 50-5 of 102mm.

China has also developed a Type 63 multiple rocket launcher of 130mm. The RPU-14 is a Soviet 140mm MRL of similar design to the Type 63.

== Description ==
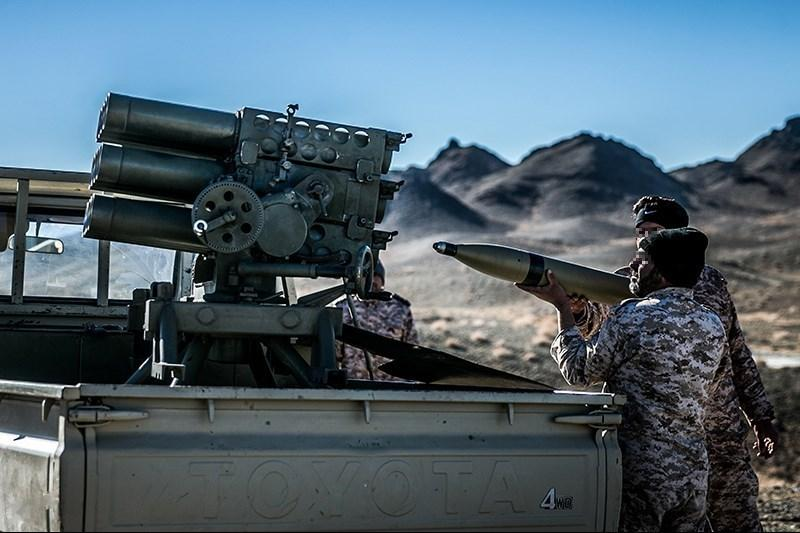
A Type 63 mounted on a pickup truck used by the IRGC.

The launcher's 12 tubes are arranged in three removable rows of four, mounted on a single-axle carriage with rubber tires. The Type 63 originally fired an 18.8 kilogram rocket (Type 63-2) with a 1.3 kilogram warhead. Ammunition for the Type 63 was later improved (Type 75 and Type 81 series), although the overall weight of the rocket remained the same. A fixed amount of propellant is contained in the rocket motor. The steel-cased rocket is stabilized with spin imparted by six angled nozzles in its base. The Type 63 was distributed on the basis of six per infantry regiment, or 18 per infantry division. For airborne and mountain units the lighter Type 63-I was developed.

The Type 63 and its copies can be mounted on different kinds of armoured and unarmoured vehicles, for example the MT-LB, the Safir, the Mamba, the RG-32 Scout, the GAZ-66 and the technicals.

== Versions ==
The Type 63 and its rockets are built in several countries including:

- Sudan – Taka.
- Iran – Fajr-1 of D.I.O. with Haseb-1 rocket.
- South Africa – RO 107 of Mechem Developments.
- North Korea – Type 75.
- North Vietnam, Vietnam – H-12.
- Turkey – Produced by MKEK as TR-107 "Anadolu" and TRB-107. Actually based on the Iranian Fajr-1 system, after some units were confiscated in a shipping vessel.
- Egypt – RL812/TLC of the Helwan Machinery and Equipment Factory (Factory 999).

== BM-12 nomenclature issue ==
NATO and western sources have used the Soviet-style designation BM-12 to describe this weapon system, and further even ascribe Soviet origin and initial manufacture of both launcher and rockets. However, there is no evidence in non-western sources of Soviet development or production, or of the BM-12 moniker being applied. Very similar Type 50-5 or Type 488 102mm rockets were manufactured in China and used in the Korean War prior to development of the Type 63.

It appears the systems designated BM-12 (for example in Afghanistan and Libya) were or are all of Chinese origin, being merely used or cross-traded by Soviet interests.

== Variants ==
=== Multiple rocket launchers ===
- The Chinese Type 81 SPMRL 107mm is a self-propelled export version, based on the Nanjing NJ-230 truck.
- Manufactured in North Korea as Type 75 with variants of 16 up to 27 launch tubes that are mounted on vehicles such as the tracked VTT-323 or the wheeled M1992 along developed cluster warhead with 15 submunitions
- ROKETSAN of Turkey has designed an improved 107mm multiple rocket launch system, consisting of a HMMWV with two 12-round launch modules and a fire control system. The system uses the TR-107 and TRB-107 rockets but the range has been increased to 11 km.
  - T-107M, Vehicle Mounted, 12 Steel Tube MBRL
  - T-107SPM, Vehicle-mounted 2 × 12 Tubes Disposable MBRL with Insulated Pod
  - T-107/122, Vehicle Mounted 3 × 20 Tubes Disposable MBRL with Insulated Pod

=== Single-tube rocket launchers ===
A number of countries have developed single-tube, man-portable rocket launchers that fire the same type of rockets:

- China: Type 85 with an empty weight of 22.5 kg.
- Egypt: PRL-81, similar to the Type 85 system.
- South Africa: Inflict of Mechem Developments with an empty weight of 26 kg.
- Iran: Karkhe, Single shot disposable launcher.

== Operators ==
=== Current operators ===
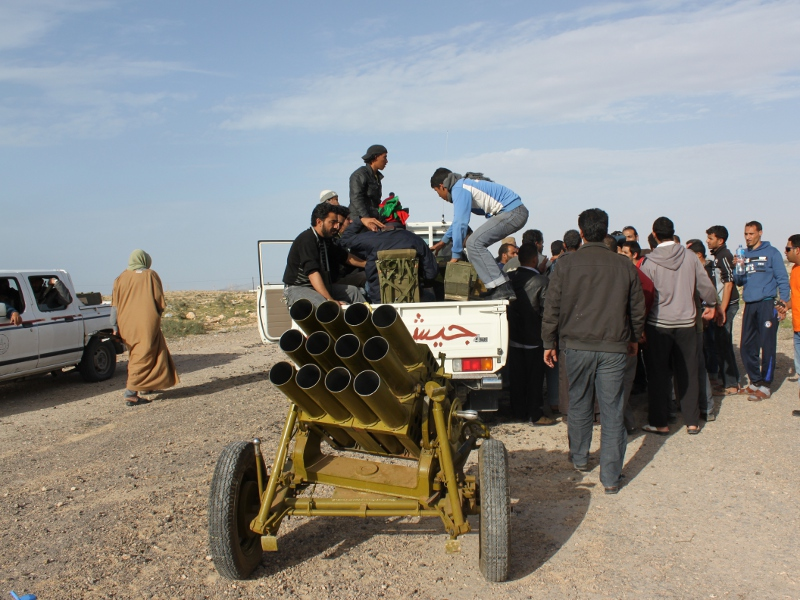
A Type 63 used by Libyan rebels.

- Albania – 270
- Azerbaijan
- Burkina Faso – ~4 as of 2021
- Cambodia
- Chad
- China
- Congo-Kinshasa – 12 as of 2021
- Djibouti
- Egypt - Manufactured locally as RL812/TLC
- Ethiopia – 25
- Gabon - 25 as of 2021
- Ghana – ~3 as of 2016
- Indonesia
- Iran – 1,300 as of 2020
  - Liwa Fatemiyoun
- Iraq
  - Iraqi Kurdistan
  - Popular Mobilization Forces
- Jordan
- North Korea
- Libya
- Mauritania – 4 as of 2016
- Myanmar – 30 as of 2016
- Namibia
- Nicaragua – 33 as of 2016
- Pakistan – Type-81 variant in service as of 2021
- Palestine Liberation Organisation
- People's Defense Units (YPG)
- Russia – Uses the Type 75 variant delivered by North Korea.
- Sahrawi Arab Democratic Republic – Sahrawi People's Liberation Army
- Somaliland: Estimated as 12.
- South Africa – (Launchers captured in Angola, rockets manufactured locally)
- South Sudan
- Sudan – 477 as of 2016
- Syria
- Turkey – Manufactured locally as TR-107.
- Venezuela - Fajr 1
- Vietnam – Fielded during the Vietnam War. 360 as of 2016
- Zimbabwe – 16 as of 2016

=== Former operators ===
- Afghanistan
- Bosnia and Herzegovina
- Lebanon
  - Lebanese Forces
  - People's Liberation Army (Lebanon)
  - Amal Movement
  - Syrian Social Nationalist Party (SSNP)/Eagles of the Whirlwind
- Liberation Tigers of Tamil Eelam: 2
- Tigray Defense Forces − Surrendered to the Ethiopian forces in the aftermath of the Tigray War

== See also ==
- T-122 Sakarya – (Turkey)
- Fajr-5 – (Iran)
- 15 cm Nebelwerfer 41 – (Nazi Germany, Germany)
- Fajr-2 (artillery rocket)
