= Gabonese Air Force =

Aerial warfare branch of the Gabonese Armed Forces

- Armée de l'air Gabonaise
- Gabonese Air Force roundel
- Active: January 25, 1972 - Present
- Country: Gabon
- Type: Air Force
- Role: Aerial warfare
- Size: 1,500
- Part of: Armed Forces of Gabon
- Headquarters: Libreville
- Anniversaries: January 25

Commanders
- Commander in Chief: Brice Oligui Nguema
- Commander of the Air Force: General Jean Martin

Insignia
- Roundel

- Fin flash

Aircraft flown
- Fighter: Dassault Mirage F1
- Helicopter: Alouette III, AS332, SA342, SA330, EC135, EC120,
- Transport: ATR 42, C-130, CN-235

The Gabonese Air Force (French: Armée de l'air Gabonaise) is the official aerial warfare branch of the Armed Forces of Gabon.

== History ==
In the early 1960s, following the country's independence from the French Republic, aerial detachments were inside the country, with the first official aerial installation being the Mouila Training Center which was established in 1966 in the south-west of the country. On January 25, 1972, by presidential decree signed by President Omar Bongo, the Gabonese Air Force became an official branch of the armed forces, separate from the army. In January 1980, at the initiative of President Bongo, the Air Force developed and adopted a combat structure, acquiring a fleet of fighters, and creating the Mvengue Air Base in the capital.

== Order of battle ==
- Fighter Squadron 1-02 Leyou at BA02 Franceville with:
  - Mirage F1AZ
  - MB-326M Impala I
- Heavy Transport Squadron at BA01 Libreville with:
  - C-130 Hercules
  - CN-235
- Ministerial Air Liaison Group (Groupe de Liaison Aérien Ministériel or GLAM) at BA01 Libreville with:
  - 1 Falcon-900EX
  - 1 Gulfstream III

=== Current inventory ===
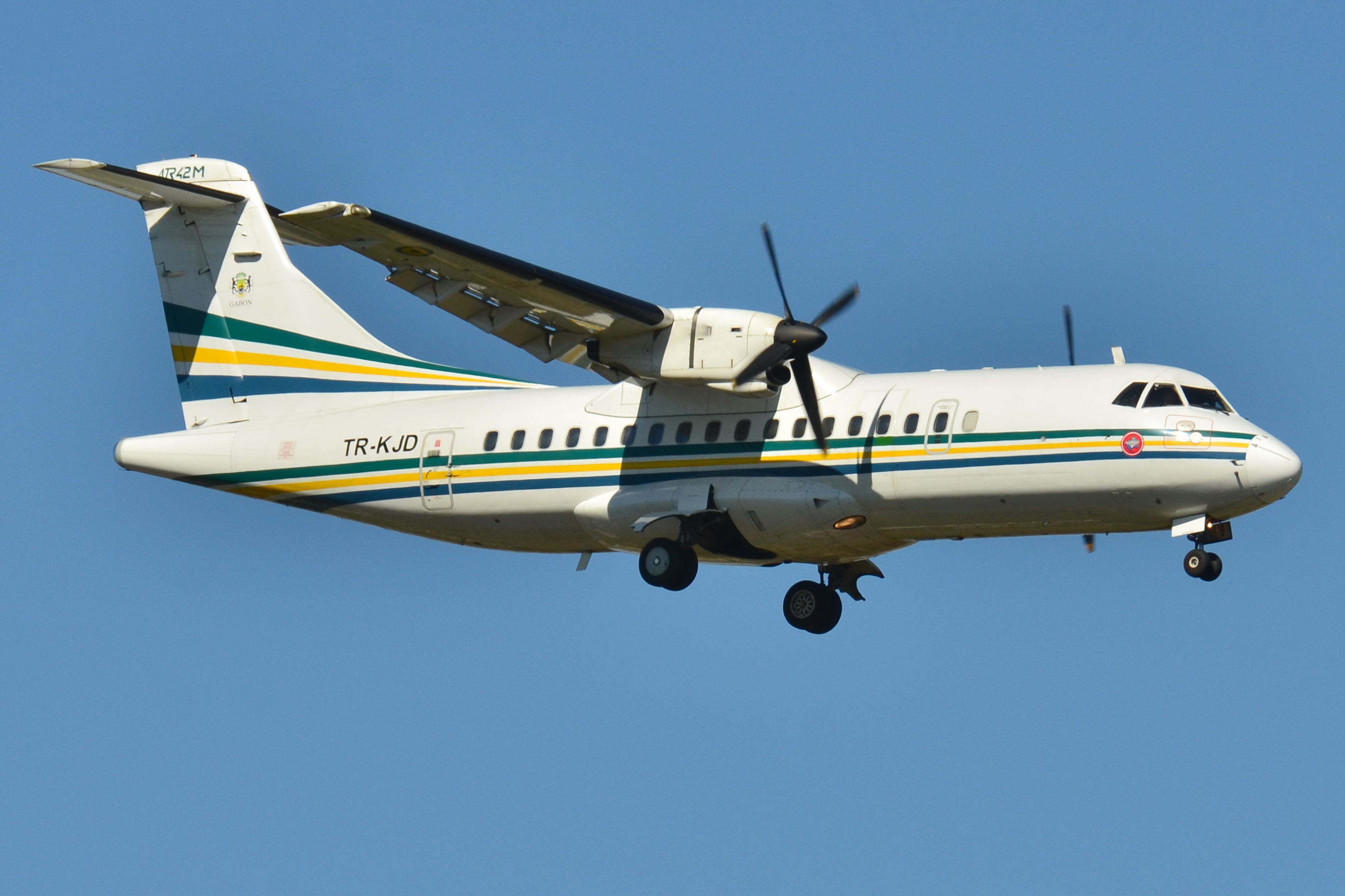
A Gabonese ATR-42 on approach

Aircraft	Origin	Type	Variant	In service	Notes
Combat aircraft
Mirage F1	France	Fighter		6	
Transport
ATR 42	France / Italy	VIP transport		1	
CASA CN-235	Indonesia / Spain	Transport		1	
EADS CASA C-295		Transport	W	1	
C-130 Hercules	United States	Transport	C-130H	1	
Helicopters
Alouette III	France	Light utility		2	
SA342 Gazelle	France	Attack / Scout		3	
Eurocopter AS332	France	Transport		1	
Aérospatiale SA 330	France	Transport / Utility		5	
Eurocopter EC135	France	Utility		2	
Eurocopter EC120	France	Light utility		2	

=== Retired aircraft ===
Previous aircraft operated by the Air Force consisted of the CM.170 Magister, C-130H Hercules, Embraer EMB 110, Fokker F28, Aérospatiale N 262, Reims C.337, and the Alouette II helicopter. The first fighters flown by the air force were Dassault Mirage 5Gs.

== Bibliography ==
- Ristor, Luc (January 1990). "Gabon: l'Armée de l'Air" [The Gabonese Air Force]. Le Fana de l'Aviation (in French) (242): 6–16. ISSN 0757-4169.
