= 2019 Gabonese coup attempt =

Failed military coup against President Bongo

2019 Gabonese coup d'état attempt
- Part of the aftermath of the 2016 Gabonese presidential election
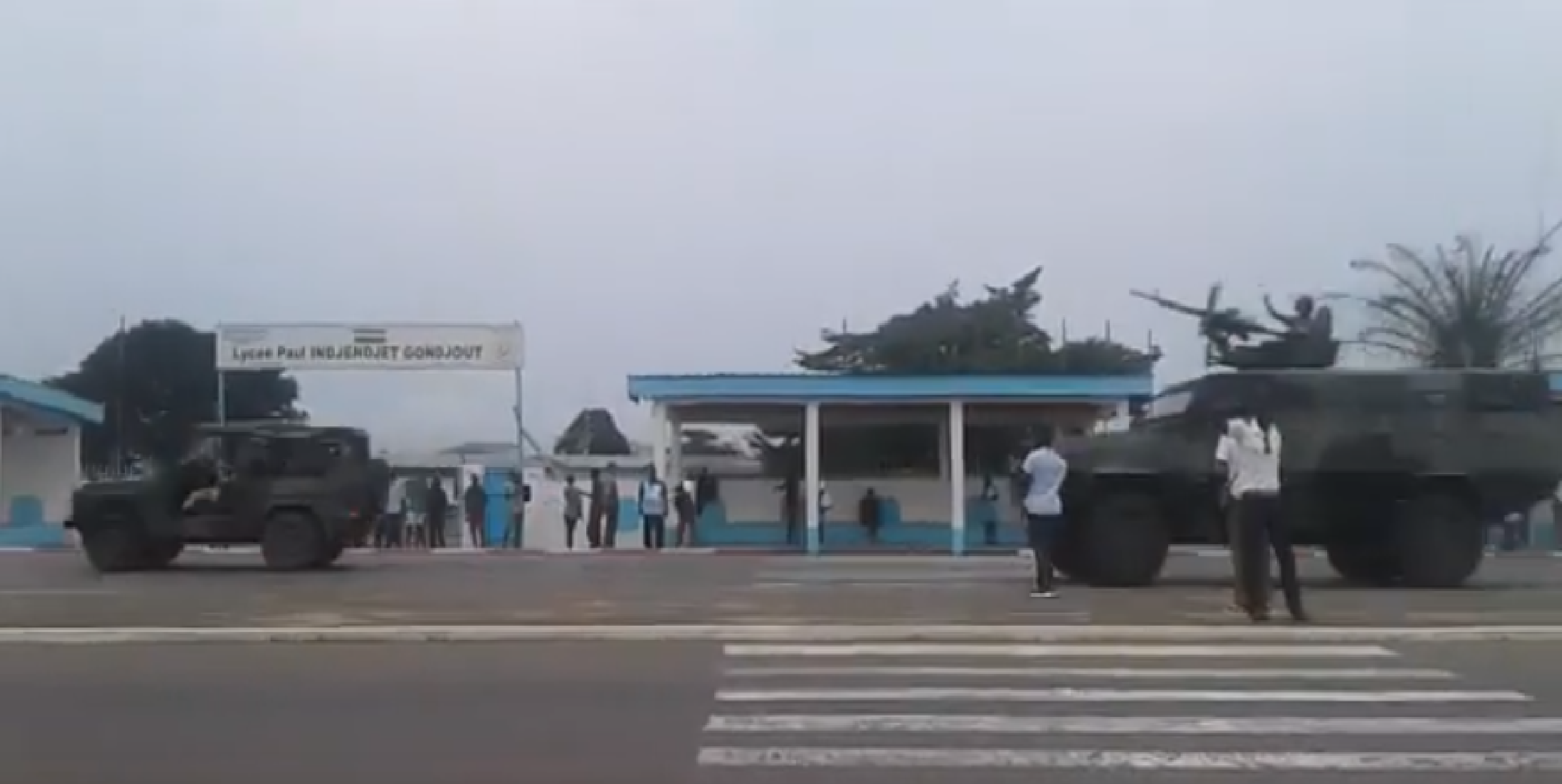
- Gabonese Army vehicles in Libreville during the coup attempt
Date	7 January 2019
Location	Libreville, Gabon 0.39241°N 9.45356°E
Result	Coup failed: President Ali Bongo Ondimba appoints Julien Nkoghe Bekale as Gabon's new prime minister

Commanders and leaders
President Ali Bongo Ondimba	Lt. Kelly Ondo Obiang

Strength
Armed Forces of Gabon: National Gendarmerie of Gabon	Armed Forces of Gabon faction: Republican Guard

Casualties and losses
	2 killed 8 arrested (3 eventually convicted)
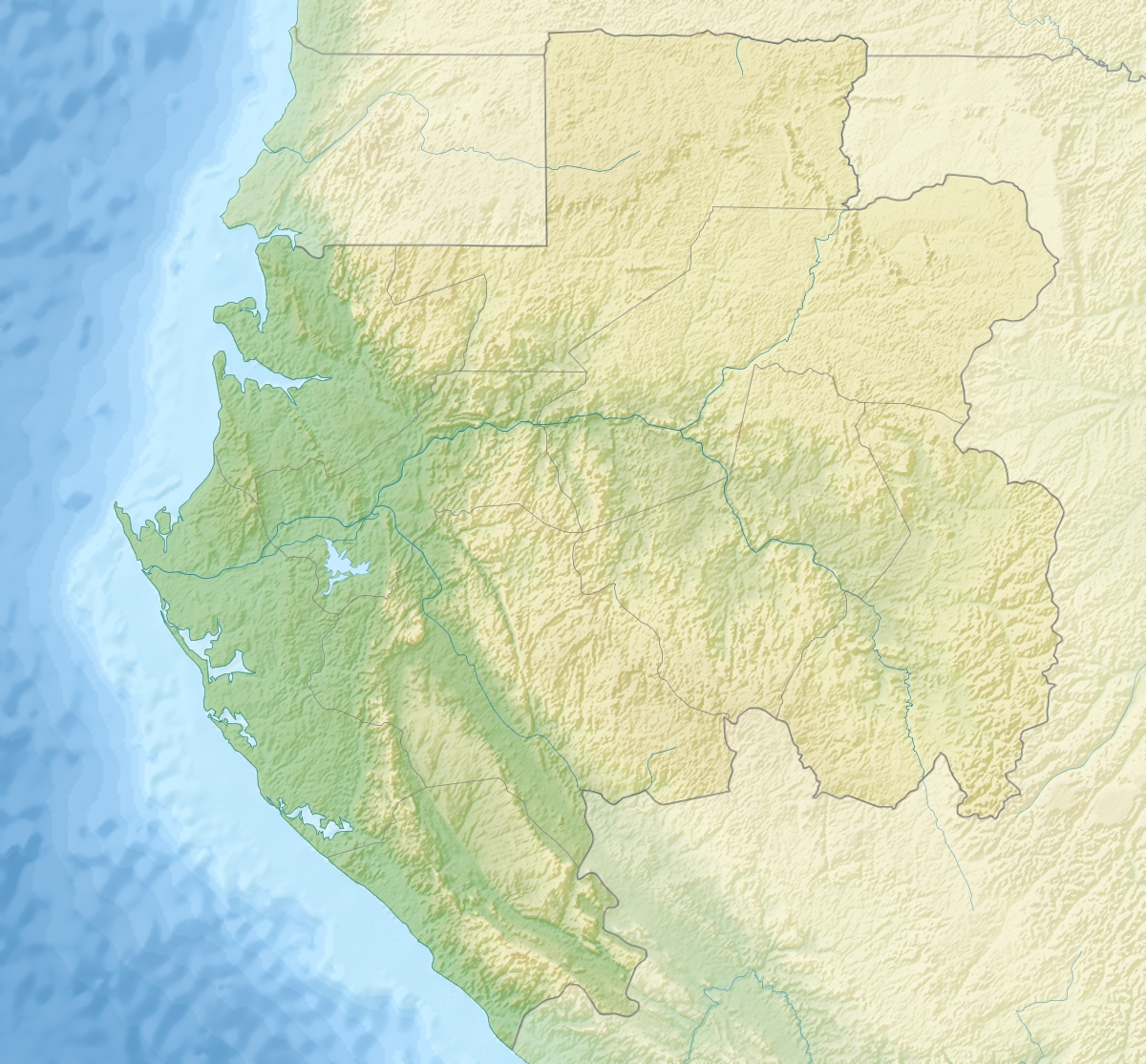
- Nexus of coup in Libreville (marked green), Gabon

On 7 January 2019, members of the Armed Forces of Gabon announced a coup d'état in Gabon. Military officers claimed that they had ousted President Ali Bongo, who was re-elected in 2016 after a controversial election and protests. During the absence of Ali Bongo, who was receiving medical treatment in Morocco, armed rebels in the capital city Libreville took hostages and declared that they had established a "National Restoration Council" to "restore democracy in Gabon". Widespread internet outages occurred throughout the country, though it is unknown whether the internet was shut down by the rebels themselves or by civilians. Gabon's government later declared that it had reasserted control.

== Developments ==
The military spokesman and leader of Patriotic Movement of the Defence and Security Forces of Gabon, Lieutenant Kelly Ondo Obiang, stated on national radio and state television on early Monday morning that he and his supporters were disappointed by President Ali Bongo’s message to the nation on New Year's Eve, calling it a "relentless attempt to cling onto power" and saying it "reinforced doubts about the president's ability to continue to carry out of the responsibilities of his office". Obiang also claimed they were setting up a "National Restoration Council...[for] restoring democracy" in Gabon. A nationwide internet disruption was detected by global internet observatory NetBlocks starting at approximately 7:00 am UTC. Among other things, Obiang delivered the following message (in French) on national radio:

"The eagerly awaited day has arrived when the army has decided to put itself on the side of the people in order to save Gabon from chaos... If you are eating, stop; if you are having a drink, stop; if you are sleeping, wake up. Wake up your neighbours ... rise up as one and take control of the street."

At the time of the coup, on 7 January 2019, President Bongo was receiving unrelated medical treatment in Morocco; he had been out of the country for about two months. President Bongo had suffered a stroke while in Riyadh, Saudi Arabia, in October; his recorded New Year's wishes were the first time he had spoken in public since then.

The pro-coup forces seized control of the national broadcaster Radio Télévision Gabonaise. Gabon's Republican Guard deployed various armoured vehicles throughout the capital, including Nexter Aravis MRAPs, a type not previously known to have been in the Gabonese military's inventory. The coup attempt was put down by 10:30 am after the Gabon's Gendarmerie Intervention Group assaulted the Radio Télévision Gabonaise in which the pro-coup forces were holed up. Two pro-coup soldiers were killed in the assault. Officers involved in the coup took hostages which have since been released by Gabonese officials. Hours after the coup announcement, government officials stated that the situation was "under control" with rebels arrested or on the run; two of the rebels were shot dead and Lieutenant Obiang was reported under arrest. NetBlocks observed that internet connectivity was briefly (though partially) restored across Gabon by 10:00 am UTC before falling back offline, and only returning fully 11:00 am the next day. Security Minister Guy-Bertrand Mapangou stated that the eight arrested people were handed over to the public prosecutor. The government of Gabon announced that President Bongo would be returning to the country "very soon".

== International reactions ==
- African Union: The chairperson of the organization's commission Moussa Faki Mahamat condemned the coup attempt.
- Egypt: The Ministry of Foreign Affairs of Egypt has condemned the coup attempt.
- France: French Foreign Ministry criticised the actions carried out by the Military. "Gabon's stability can only be ensured in strict compliance with the provisions of its constitution" said a spokeswoman of the ministry.
- South Africa: In a statement, the Department of International Relations and Cooperation said "South Africa reaffirms the African Union principle of the total rejection of all unconstitutional change of power".
- Turkey: Turkish Foreign Ministry declared its condemnation of the coup attempt: "Turkey opposes all attempts to illegally overthrow democratically elected governments".
- Nigeria: Alluding to the coup attempt, President Muhammadu Buhari said "The military officers in Gabon should understand that the era of military coups and governments in Africa and indeed worldwide, is long gone".
- Chad: President Idriss Deby, who is also the current head of the Economic Community of Central African States, also condemned the coup attempt and applauded the swift action taken by Gabonese defense and security forces in quashing the coup.

== Aftermath ==
On 1 July 2021, mutineers Kelly Ondo Obiang, Estimé Bidima Manongo and Dimitri Nze Minko were sentenced to 15 years in prison by the Special Military Court.

On 12 August 2025, the government issued an amnesty for participants in the coup attempt.

== See also ==
- 2016 Gabonese protests
- 1964 Gabonese coup d'état
- 2023 Gabonese coup d'état
- History of Gabon
