= Bongo family =

Gabonese political family

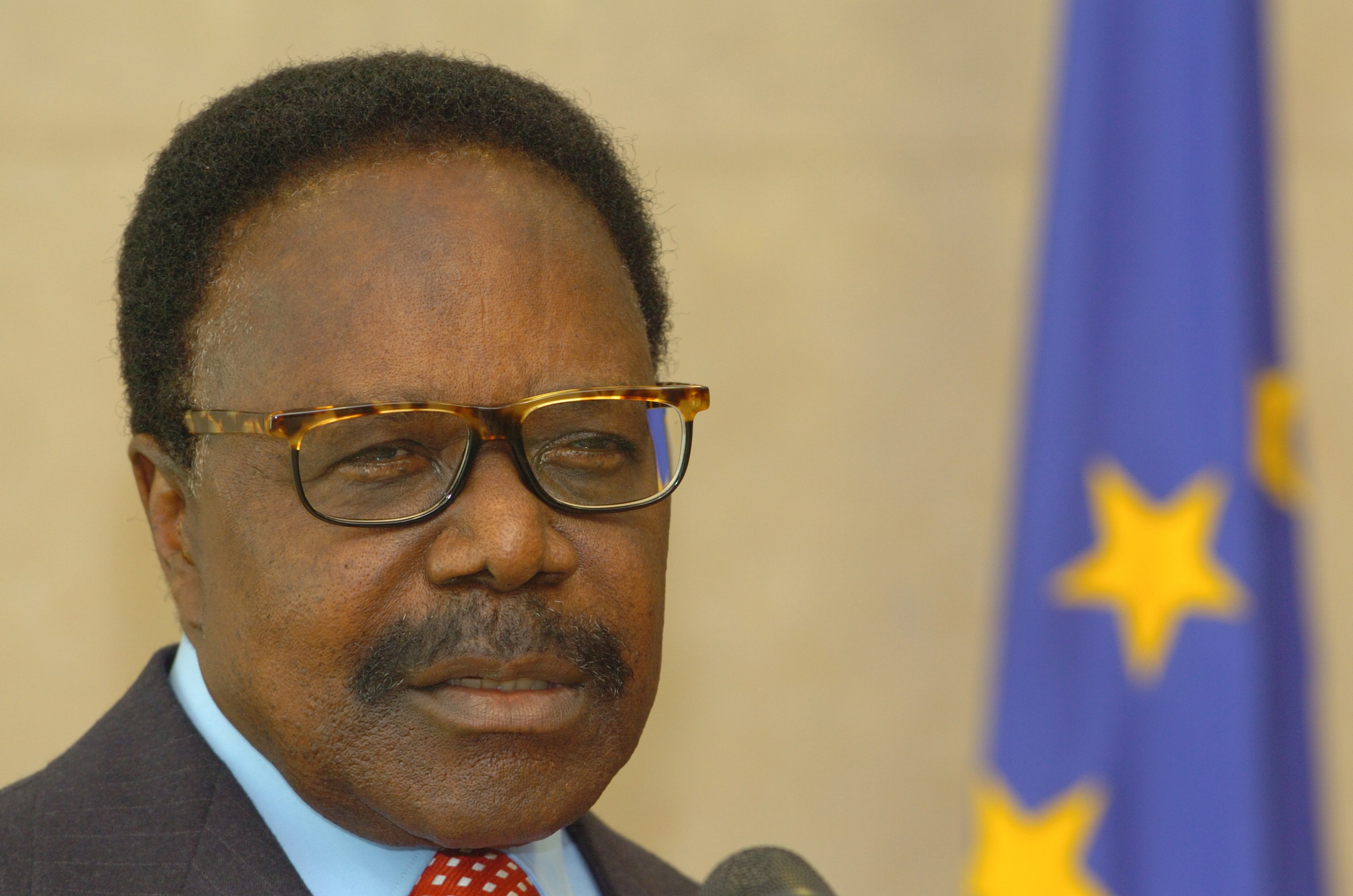
Omar Bongo

The Bongo family is a Gabonese and Congolese political family of Teke origin. Three members of the family have ruled Gabon since 1967 – Omar Bongo was president until his death in 2009 and was succeeded by Ali Bongo, who served until 2023 when he was overthrown by his cousin Brice Oligui Nguema in a coup.

Denis Sassou Nguesso, president of the Republic of the Congo, is related to the Bongo family through the marriage of his late daughter Edith Lucie to Omar Bongo.

== Family tree ==
Denis Sassou Nguesso; 1943–present r. 1979–1992 (Note: As President of the People's Republic of the Congo) r. 1997–present (Note: As President of the Republic of the Congo)
Edith Lucie Bongo; 1964–2009	Omar Bongo; 1935–2009 r. 1967–2009	Patience Dabany; 1941–present
Sylvia Bongo Ondimba; 1963–present	Ali Bongo; 1959–present r. 2009–2023	Albertine Amissa Bongo; 1964–1993
Noureddin Bongo Valentin	Jalil Bongo Valentin	Bilal Bongo Valentin

== Other members ==
- Brice Oligui Nguema is a maternal cousin of Ali Bongo.
- Louise Mouyabi Moukala was Omar Bongo's first wife.
- Pascaline Bongo Ondimba is a daughter of Omar Bongo. Bob Marley was her ex-partner but he isn't related to the Bongo family.
- Paul Toungui, husband of Pascaline Bongo Ondimba.
- Colonel Frédéric Bongo, half-brother of Ali Bongo.
- Brother of Oligui, Dieudonné Aba'A Oyono is the head of the Constitutional Court.
- Zita Nyangue Oligui is the wife of Oligui.
- François Makoba father of Zita Nyangue Oligui.
- Irène Moussounda mother of Zita Nyangue Oligui.
- Régis Onanga Ndiaye is the brother-in-law of Brice Oligui Nguema.
- General Grégoire Kouna is a cousin of Ali Bongo.
- Marie-Claire Dirat mother of Edith Bongo.
- Omar Denis Junior Bongo Ondimba son of Edith and Omar Bongo.
- Yacine Queeni Bongo Ondimba son of Edith and Omar Bongo.
- Inge Lynn Collins Bongo second wife of Ali Bongo.
- Malika Bongo daughter of Ali Bongo.
- Jérôme Dabany mother-in law of Omar Bongo.
- Véronique Nabibiga father-in law of Omar Bongo.
- Édouard Valentin father of Sylvia Bongo Ondimba.
- Aimée Baudier mother of Sylvia Bongo Ondimba.
- Elizabeth Bongo grandchild of Sylvia and Ali Bongo.
- Deborah Bongo grandchild of Sylvia and Ali Bongo.
- Dyah Bongo grandchild of Sylvia and Ali Bongo.
- Martin Bongo nephew of Omar Bongo.
- Léon Paul Ngoulakia cousin of Ali Bongo.
- Annick Aubierge Laffite mother of Malika Bongo Ondimba
- Emery Pierre Claver Ngoulakia father of Léon Paul Ngoulakia.
- Mpinoboumou Emma Rose mother of Léon Paul Ngoulakia.
- Marie-Madeleine Mborantsuo former romantic partner of Omar Bongo.
- Chantal Myboto daughter of Zacharie Myboto.
- Zacharie Myboto
- Onaïda Maïsha Bongo Ondimba daughter of Chantal Myboto and Omar Bongo.
- Zainab Peeroo one of the many wives of Omar Bongo.
- Ahmed Bongo son of Zainab Peeroo and Omar Bongo.
- Yusuf Bongo son of Zainab Peeroo and Omar Bongo.
- Eleven siblings of Omar Bongo.
- Two children of Marie-Madeleine Mborantsuo and Omar Bongo.
- Grace Bongo
- Betty Bongo
- Arthur Bongo
- Hermine Bongo
- Jeanne Matoua
- Joseph Matoua
- Other 14 children of Omar Bongo (It's rumored that he has combined 53 or 54 children).

== Related families ==
=== Family of Jean Ping ===
- Jean Ping, ex-husband of Pascaline Omar Bongo.
- Cheng Zhiping (also known as Charles Ping or Wang Ping), father of Jean Ping.
- Germaine Anina, mother of Jean Ping.
- Children of Jean Ping and Marie-Madeleine Liane.
- Children of Jean Ping and Jeanne-Thérèse.
- Jean-Boniface Assélé, brother-in-law of Onar Bongo.

=== Family of Denis Sassou Nguesso ===
- Antoinette Sassou Nguesso, wife of Denis Sassou Nguesso.
- Denis-Christel Sassou Nguesso, son of Denis Sassou Nguesso.
- Danièle Sassou Nguesso, wife of Denis-Christel Sassou Nguesso.
- Julienne Sassou Nguesso, daughter of Denis Sassou Nguesso.
- Claudia Sassou Nguesso, daughter of Denis Sassou Nguesso.
- Pascal Loemba Tchibota, father of Antoinette Sassou Nguesso.
- Marie-Louise Djembo, mother of Antoinette Sassou Nguesso.
- Helena Lydia Barro Chambrier, niece of Antoinette Sassou Nguesso.
- Alexandre Barro Chambrier, husband of Helena Lydia Barro Chambrier.
- Five children of Chambrier.
- Marcel Éloi Rahandi Chambrier, father of Alexandre Barro Chambrier.
- Aimé Emmanuel Yoka, uncle of Denis Sassou Nguesso.
- Pierre Anga, uncle of Denis Sassou Nguesso.
- Julien Nguesso, father of Denis Sassou Nguesso.
- Émilienne Mouebara, mother of Denis Sassou Nguesso.
- Lily Kaniki, mother of Denis-Christel Sassou Nguesso.
- Laurent Monsengwo Pasinya, cousin of Kaniki. He belonged to one of the royal families of Basakata.
- Wilfrid Nguesso
