= 2023 Gabonese general election =

- 26 August 2023
- Presidential election
- Turnout: 56.65% ▼
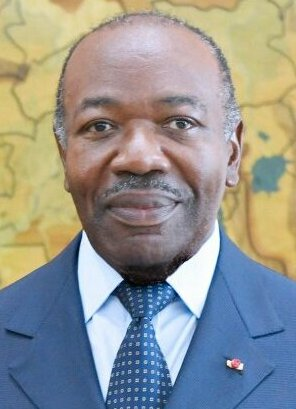

Nominee	Ali Bongo	Albert Ondo Ossa
Party	PDG	A23
Popular vote	293,919	140,690
Percentage	64.27%	30.77%
President before election
Ali Bongo
PDG
Elected President
Ali Bongo
(Election results annulled)
(General Brice Oligui Nguema named Transitional President)
- Parliamentary election
- All 143 seats in the National Assembly; 72 seats needed for a majority
Prime Minister before	Prime Minister after
Alain Claude Bilie By Nze; PDG	Election results annulled (Raymond Ndong Sima named Interim Prime Minister)

General elections were held in Gabon on 26 August 2023. Incumbent president Ali Bongo ran for re-election, representing the Gabonese Democratic Party, which had ruled the country continuously since its independence from France in 1960, including 41 years under Bongo's father, Omar.

Bongo was declared the winner on 30 August. However, a coup d'état began shortly afterward, leading to the election results being annulled.

Local and departmental elections were held the same day.

== Background ==
The previous presidential election was held on 27 August 2016. On the day after the elections, opposition leader Jean Ping declared victory and said that he was "waiting for the outgoing president to call to congratulate me," although no results had been officially announced. Only the electoral commission was legally permitted to announce results, and the Minister of the Interior, Pacôme Moubelet-Boubeya, accused Ping of "attempt[ing] to manipulate the democratic process," while Bongo said that "you must not sell the skin of the bear before you've killed him." Nevertheless, Bongo's spokesman, Alain Claude Bilie By Nzé, asserted that Bongo was ahead and would be re-elected. Official results were scheduled to be announced on 30 August, but on that date it was stated that the announcement would be delayed by a few hours. Results were finally announced on 31 August, showing a narrow victory for Bongo, who won 49.8% of the vote against 48.2% for Ping. Turnout was placed at 59.5%. The opposition's representatives on the electoral commission refused to confirm the results, and they were therefore confirmed by a vote in which the opposition members abstained. Ping's supporters maintained that the mostly complete results they had independently collected showed their candidate beating Bongo by a large margin, 59% to 38%. Notably, the official results from Haut-Ogooue (the Bongo family's native province) showed Bongo receiving 95.5% of the vote on an alleged 99.9% turnout, an improbable result sparking widespread protests. Bongo, noting that the vote was close, stressed the importance of peacefully respecting this outcome.

Following the announcement of official results, protests broke out in Libreville on 31 August, with attempts made to storm the election commission's offices. Police were out in force and tried to disperse the protesters. The Parliament building was set on fire later in the day. The following day, Ping claimed that the presidential guard had bombed his party's headquarters, killing two people. By 2 September at least five people had been killed in the capital and 1,000 more had been arrested. The United Nations expressed "deep concern" about the violence. Along with France and the United States, it called for de-escalation on both sides of the dispute and pressed for more transparent detail on the vote outcome.

=== Opposition call for fair elections ===
On 12 December 2022, the entire Gabonese opposition gathered in Libreville for the start of a series of meetings in view of the 2023 presidential and legislative elections. This meeting, at the call of the National Union, brought together fifty parties, including civil society leaders. The meeting was meant to put pressure on the government to reform the electoral process, and remind the public authorities of the need for consultation with the opposition. For Paulette Missambo, president of National Union, urgent reforms were needed in order to ensure a fair election.

== Electoral system ==
The President of Gabon is elected for a five-year term (reduced from seven years in April 2023) in a single round of voting by plurality; whichever candidate places first is deemed elected, regardless of whether the candidate secured an absolute majority of votes. This system is thought to be a disadvantage to the fractious opposition, which would appear to have little chance of winning unless it unites behind a single candidate.

The 143 members of the National Assembly are elected from single-member constituencies using the two-round system.

The elections were held using double simultaneous vote system, with voters casting a single ballot for their preferred candidate for president and National Assembly.

== Candidates ==
20 candidates were approved by the Gabonese electoral congress for the 2023 presidential election.

Portrait	President Candidates	Took office	Left office	Party
	Ali Bongo Ondimba (incumbent)	26 August 2023		PDG
	Jean Ping			Independent
	Hugues Alexandre Barro Chambrier			RPM
	Mike Steeve Dave Jocktan			Independent
	Pierre-Claver Maganga Moussavou			PSD
	Paulette Missambo			UN
	Raymond Ndong Sima			Independent
	Albert Ondo Ossa			A23
	Gérard Ella Nguéma Mitoghé			FPG
	Jean Delors Biyogué Bi Ntougou			Independent
	Jean Romain Fanguinoveny			PPG
	Thérence Gnembou Moutsona			PRC
	Victoire Lasseni Duboze			Independent
	Axel Stophène Ibinga Ibinga			Independent
	Joachim Mbatchi Pambo			FDR
	Abel Mbombe Nzoundou			Independent
	Jean Victor Mouanga Mbadinga			MESP
	Emmanuel Mvé Mba			Independent
	Thierry Yvon Michel N'goma			Independent
	Gervais Oniane		26 August 2023	Independent

Jean Ping, the former chair of the African Union Commission who received 48% of the vote in the 2016 presidential election, declined to stand, saying "I cannot be a candidate in an election that is a foregone conclusion".

== Conduct ==
The government announced the indefinite restriction of internet access and a nightly curfew on the evening of the election following the end of voting. The same day, the government suspended broadcasts of French media channels France 24, RFI, and TV5Monde.

== Results ==
=== President ===
The national electoral body announced on Wednesday, 30 August, that President Ali Bongo Ondimba, already in office for 14 years, won re-election for a third term with 64.27 percent of the vote.

According to Michel Stephane Bonda, head of the Gabonese Elections Centre, on state television, Bongo defeated his major competitor Albert Ondo Ossa, who received 30.77 percent of the vote, in a single round of voting, while 12 other candidates split the remaining votes. The voter turnout was 56.65%.

Candidate	Party	Votes	%
Ali Bongo Ondimba	Gabonese Democratic Party	293,919	64.27
Albert Ondo Ossa	Alternance 2023	140,690	30.77
Pierre Claver Moussavou	Social Democratic Party	5,178	1.13
Gervais Oniane	Union for the Republic	3,639	0.80
Victoire Lasseni Duboze	Independent	2,198	0.48
Emmanuel Mvé Mba	Independent	1,412	0.31
Jean Romain Fanguinoveny	Party of the Gabonese People	1,272	0.28
Jean Delors Biyogué Bi Ntougou	Independent	1,266	0.28
Gérard Ella Nguéma	Gabonese Patriotic Front	1,239	0.27
Axel Stophène Ibinga Ibinga	Independent	1,124	0.25
Abel Mbombe Nzoundou	Independent	1,057	0.23
Jean Victor Mouanga Mbadinga	People's Social Emancipation Movement	1,034	0.23
Joachim Mbatchi Pambou	Union of Forces for Change	967	0.21
Thierry Yvon Michel N'goma	Independent	825	0.18
Other candidates		1,468	0.32
Total		457,288	100.00
Valid votes		457,288	95.34
Invalid/blank votes		22,364	4.66
Total votes		479,652	100.00
Registered voters/turnout		846,822	56.64
Source: Gabon Review

=== National Assembly ===
The results of the elections for the Parliament of Gabon were unclear following the coup d'état four days after the general election.

== Aftermath ==
After Ali Bongo Ondimba's election victory was announced, a military-led coup took place, which annulled the results of the election.

The coup occurred just minutes after Bongo's re-election was declared at 3:30 am WAT by the Gabonese electoral commission with 64.27% of the vote. During a televised morning address from the Presidential Palace in Libreville on the state channel Gabon 24, around a dozen military personnel announced the end of the existing regime, with a military spokesperson claiming to be speaking on behalf of a "Committee for the Transition and Restoration of Institutions," citing "irresponsible, unpredictable governance" that had led to "a continuous degradation of social cohesion, risking pushing the country into chaos." They announced the annulment of the recent election, the dissolution of state institutions, and the closure of the country's borders. Internet access, which had been cut since the election, was reported to have been restored. Among the officers seen during the announcement were army colonels and members of the Republican Guard.

Following the announcement of the coup, celebrations broke out in the streets of Libreville and in other cities across the country.

A constitutional referendum was held in November 2024.
