= Death and state funeral of Omar Bongo =

2009 death and state funeral of the President of Gabon

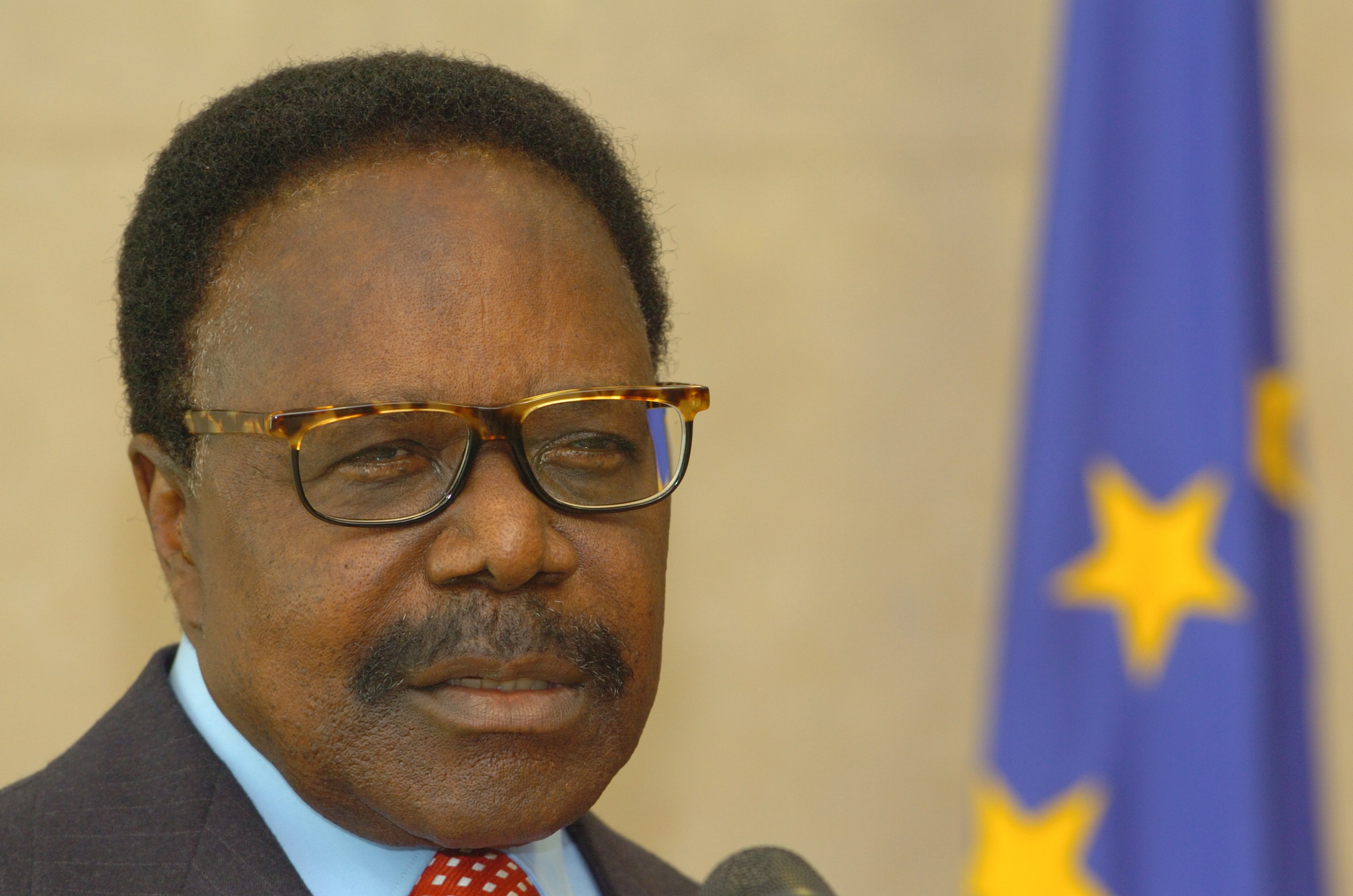
- Bongo in 2005
- Date: 8 June 2009 (death); 16 June 2009 (state funeral)
- Location: Barcelona, Spain (death) Libreville, Gabon (state funeral)

Omar Bongo, the President of Gabon, died in Spain on 8 June 2009, after having suffered from colorectal cancer. A month of mourning and state funeral, spanning 11 to 18 June, followed.

After Bongo's death his coffin was flown from Barcelona to Libreville on 11 June. It was driven to his presidential palace beside the Atlantic Ocean and displayed until 16 June, when a state funeral service was conducted. The date of the funeral was declared a day of national mourning by acting president Rose Francine Rogombé. The service was attended by dignitaries from at least forty nations. Bongo's coffin was then transported to his home village for burial on 18 June.

At the time of his death, Bongo, who had served as president since 1967, had been Africa's longest serving leader.

== Death ==
On 7 May 2009, the Gabonese government announced that Bongo had temporarily suspended his official duties and taken time off to mourn his wife Edith Lucie Bongo and rest in Spain.

It was reported by the international media that he was seriously ill, and undergoing treatment for cancer in hospital in Barcelona, Spain. The Gabonese government maintained that he was in Spain for a few days of rest following the "intense emotional shock" of his wife's death, but eventually admitted that he was in a Spanish clinic "undergoing a medical check up". AFP eventually released a report stating among other things that "While Gabon's government has insisted he was undergoing a medical check-up, several sources said he was being treated for intestinal cancer, which they said had reached an advanced stage".

On 7 June 2009, unconfirmed reports quoting French media and citing sources "close to the French government" reported that Bongo had died in Spain. The government of Gabon denied the report and the French foreign ministry refused to confirm it. The same day, Gabon's prime minister released a statement saying that he visited Bongo in the Quiron clinic in Barcelona and confirmed that he was still alive. He made no comment on Bongo's state of health after reading the statement to reporters.

On 8 June 2009, the BBC released a report stating that: "The Spanish foreign affairs ministry backed [Prime Minister] Ndong's assertion, saying: 'We have confirmed that he [President Bongo] is alive. We have no further information about him'. But later on Monday, reports in the Spanish media said Bongo had died shortly after Ndong's news conference. They quoted members of Bongo's entourage as saying the African leader had died at 12:00 GMT. The clinic and the Spanish government refused to comment on the latest reports".

The Gabonese government maintained its position. Sky News reported that a Gabonese government spokesman had stated: "The presidency of the Gabonese Republic would like to stress that the President of the Republic, the Head of State, His Excellency Omar Bongo is not dead ... He is continuing his holiday in Spain following his checkup at the Quiron Clinic in Barcelona". Speaking on French radio, spokesman Raphael N'Toutoume added that the latest update he had heard was good news – and that Bongo was preparing to leave the clinic. "We are getting ready to welcome the head of state. No date for his return has been set", the spokesman said. Gabonese officials were privately furious with the premature announcement by France, questioning how Germany would react if France announced the death of Angela Merkel.

Bongo's death was confirmed by Prime Minister Jean Eyeghe Ndong in a written statement on 8 June 2009. In his statement, Eyeghe Ndong said that Bongo had died of a heart attack shortly before 12:30 GMT on 8 June.

== Aftermath ==
The coffin of Omar Bongo was draped in the flag of Gabon.

=== Period of mourning ===
Rose Francine Rogombé was sworn in as interim president on 10 June 2009, immediately declaring a period of mourning lasting thirty days. A government statement issued in the daily L'Union newspaper on 11 June, declared that day and the day of the funeral a public holiday. Businesses and offices were shut down in Libreville, with the city's mayor ordering all bars and nightclubs to be closed until after the funeral.

=== Arrival at Libreville airport ===
Bongo's corpse was flown by aircraft from his death place in Barcelona and arrived at Libreville's airport on 11 June at approximately 16:15 pm (01:15 AEST). A crowd of around 10,000 people, including diplomats, politicians and members of the country's security forces were waiting at the airport for the dead President's arrival. Several people were tearful, including cabinet chief Pascaline, also known as Bongo's daughter, who lay emotional in the arms of President Denis Sassou Nguesso. Young people in the crowd were seen to wear T-shirts decorated with Bongo photos and slogans which read: "I love and admire my president". Officials were also emotional as they left the plane, Bongo's coffin in tow, draped in Gabon's national flag.

The coffin was lifted into a military vehicle and it drove off. It arrived at Bongo's oceanside presidential palace overlooking the Atlantic. There it lay in state until the President's state funeral on 16 June 2009.

Also on hand were Nicolas Sarkozy and Jacques Chirac — the current and former French presidents and the only Western heads of state to attend. The pair arrived in a stretch limousine and were quickly escorted inside the palace as a group of people outside yelled, "No to France!" Sarkozy and Chirac later approached the coffin together and stood before it with their eyes lowered. They laid down a wreath of roses. Then, each signed a condolence book. Chad's President Idriss Déby bowed his head before the coffin. Cameroon's Paul Biya placed a wreath of flowers at the foot of the coffin, as did Burkina Faso's Blaise Compaoré.

=== State funeral ===
A military parade was held to honour Bongo on 16 June 2009. Hundreds of thousands of people lined the streets to say farewell to Bongo, whose flag-draped coffin was paraded through Libreville. The state funeral began inside the marble halls of the presidential palace. The red carpet leading to his casket was strewn with white rose petals, flown in from France.

In a eulogy, Bongo's son and defence minister, Ali Bongo said: "You leave a peaceful, free and fair Gabon".

Bongo was privately buried in his native village on 18 June 2009.

==== Dignitaries ====
Dignitaries from many nations arrived in Gabon to attend the funeral. This included approximately forty heads of state or their representatives, about a dozen of whom were from other African countries.

President of the Central African Republic, François Bozizé, arrived in Libreville on 11 June.

South African International Relations and Cooperation Minister Maite Nkoana-Mashabane and Sizakele Makhumalo Zuma, the wife of President Jacob Zuma, left for Gabon on 15 June and planned to return to South Africa on 16 June.

The Angolan Prime Minister, António Paulo Kassoma, flew to Libreville on 15 June to represent President José Eduardo dos Santos at the funeral. Prince Moulay Rachid of Morocco represented his brother, King Mohammed VI on 16 June.

The French president Nicolas Sarkozy attended the funeral, despite a period of diplomatic difficulties between France and Gabon. Former French President Jacques Chirac and Sarkozy laid red and white coloured roses in wreaths at the coffin. Foreign Minister Bernard Kouchner was also present at the ceremony. Chirac received cheers but Sarkozy was booed by crowd members who had gathered outside the presidential palace.

Spanish Third Deputy Prime Minister, Manuel Chaves González, attended the funeral.

Others in attendance at the funeral included President of the Republic of the Congo, Denis Sassou Nguesso, President of Togo, Faure Gnassingbé, President of Cameroon, Paul Biya and Jean Ping, Chairperson of the African Union Commission, Teodoro Obiang Nguema Mbasogo of Equatorial Guinea, and the Presidents of Benin, Burkina Faso, Burundi, Chad, Mali, Senegal and the Democratic Republic of São Tomé and Príncipe.

== Reactions ==
Acting president Rose Francine Rogombé received the condolences of several world leaders following the death of Bongo.

- Cameroonian President Paul Biya sent his condolences to Rose Francine Rogombé, describing Bongo's death as "a great loss" to both Gabon and Africa and saying that Bongo was "an exceptional statesman and prominent political figure who had continuously worked for peace". The media in Cameroon described Bongo as "very friendly and full of good humour", with journalists remembering him affectionately. Members of the general public in Cameroon described Bongo as "a tested politician who tactfully ruled his country and left it in peace". Heads of diplomatic missions at Yaoundé's Gabonese Embassy mourned as did several Gabonese delegations who trooped at the Embassy.
- Chinese President Hu Jintao sent a message of condolence "on behalf of the Chinese government and people as well as in his own name" to Rose Francine Rogombe following the death of President Omar Bongo, calling him "a close friend of the Chinese people" and saying that they would "regret losing such a faithful friend". Bongo visited China 11 times during his reign.
- President of Zambia, Rupiah Banda expressed his condolences with the Gabonese government and people, comparing Bongo's death to that of his predecessor as Zambian president, Levy Mwanawasa, who died in 2008. Banda sent a letter to Rose Francine Rogombe, calling Bongo a "pan-Africanist who tirelessly and tenaciously worked for the unity of the African continent" and saying that Bongo's "outstanding, frank sentiments and contributions" during African Union summits would be missed across the continent.

A 2010 FIFA World Cup qualifier between Cameroon and Gabon was postponed by FIFA following Bongo's death, with the Gabonese Football Federation being informed by letter. The match was rescheduled for 5 September.

The Economic Community of West African States (ECOWAS) declared a thirty-day period of mourning. Republic of the Congo declared eight days of mourning; Central African Republic declared seven days of mourning; Benin, Chad, Equatorial Guinea, and São Tomé and Príncipe all declared three days of mourning.

Icelandic magazine Iceland Review referenced Bongo's death, calling him an "astute Gabon ruler".
