= 2023 Gabonese coup d'état =

Military coup against President Ali Bongo

- Part of the Coup Belt
- Topographic map of Gabon
Date	30 August 2023
Location	Gabon
Result	Coup d'état successful: President Ali Bongo arrested and his government ousted; Military assumes control, General Brice Oligui Nguema announced as transitional president; Results of the 2023 Gabonese general election annulled; All state institutions dissolved and international borders closed for three days; Junta announces elections in 2025; Ali Bongo released by Junta on 8 September

Belligerents
Government of Gabon: Gabonese Democratic Party	Committee for the Transition and Restoration of Institutions: Republican Guard

Commanders and leaders
Ali Bongo Ondimba; Rose Christiane Raponda; Alain Claude Bilie By Nze	Brice Clotaire Oligui Nguema; Ulrich Manfoumbi Manfoumbi

Units involved
	Armed Forces of Gabon faction Republican Guard

On 30 August 2023, a coup d'état occurred in Gabon shortly after the announcement that incumbent president Ali Bongo had won the general election held on 26 August. It was the eighth successful coup to occur in West and Central Africa since 2020.

The coup's leader Brice Oligui Nguema is part of the Bongo family and overthrew his cousin Ali Bongo. The coup brought an end to the 56-year-long rule of the father-and-son duo Omar and Ali Bongo over Gabon. It has been described by some as a palace coup.

== Background ==
Since independence from France in 1960, Gabon has primarily been ruled by the Bongo family starting with President Omar Bongo in 1967 and, following his death in 2009, by his son Ali Bongo Ondimba. Ali Bongo was re-elected in an election in 2016 which prompted a failed coup attempt in 2019. During the rule of the Bongo family the country had been plagued by accusations of corruption and nepotism, several elections had been tainted by reports of fraud or irregularities (notably, the official results of the 2016 election from the Bongo family's native province of Haut-Ogooué showed Bongo receiving 95.5% of the vote on an alleged 99.9% turnout, an improbable result sparking widespread protests), and the Constitution and electoral laws had been changed multiple times in order to remove term limits, change the voting system to exploit the fractured opposition, and change the timing of elections to ensure the opposition could not rally following a win by the ruling party.

Despite being a member of OPEC, one of Africa's major producers of oil (which accounts for 60% of national revenue), and having one of the highest per-capita GDPs on the continent, Gabon faces serious socioeconomic crises: a third of the population lives below the poverty line of US$5.50 per day, and the unemployment rate among Gabonese aged 15 to 24 was estimated at 40% in 2020. Gabon was also ranked 136th out of 180 countries for the perception of corruption by Transparency International in 2022.

In a speech delivered on the country's Independence Day on 17 August, Bongo, a close ally of France, insisted that he would not allow Gabon to be subjected to "destabilization", referring to other recent coups in the region.

=== 2023 elections ===
Following presidential elections held on 26 August 2023, the incumbent president, Ali Bongo, who had been seeking re-election for a third term, was declared the winner according to an official announcement made on 30 August. However, allegations of electoral fraud and irregularities immediately emerged from opposition parties and independent observers, casting doubt over the legitimacy of the election results. Among those who criticized the results was Albert Ondo Ossa, who had come second in the elections according to the official count. Parliamentary elections, departmental elections and local elections were held the same day.

Just two hours before the polls closed, Ondo Ossa denounced "fraud orchestrated by the Bongo camp". He had already claimed victory and urged Bongo to facilitate a peaceful transfer of power based on his own purported vote count. The official election results were announced in the middle of the night on state television without prior notice. The country was placed under curfew and internet access was cut off throughout the nation, measures implemented by the government to prevent the spread of "false news" and potential violence.

== Coup ==
=== Events ===
Amidst growing scrutiny and widespread protests over the conduct of the elections, the Armed Forces of Gabon launched a pre-dawn coup on 30 August. Soldiers led by high-ranking officers seized control of key government buildings, communication channels, and strategic points within the capital Libreville. Gunfire was also heard in the city.

The coup occurred just minutes after Bongo's re-election was declared at 3:30 am WAT by the Gabonese Electoral Commission with 64.27% of the vote. During a televised morning address from the Presidential Palace in Libreville on the state channel Gabon 24, around a dozen military personnel announced the end of the existing regime, with a military spokesperson claiming to be speaking on behalf of a "Committee for the Transition and Restoration of Institutions", citing "irresponsible, unpredictable governance" that had led to "a continuous degradation of social cohesion, risking pushing the country into chaos." Among the officers seen during the announcement were army colonels and members of the Republican Guard. They announced the annulment of the recent election, the dissolution of state institutions, and the closure of the country's borders, which were reopened on 2 September. Internet access, which had been cut since the election, was reported to have been restored, while the curfew put in place at the time of the election was extended until further notice. but was later shortened to the early morning.

=== Arrests of Ali Bongo and other officials ===
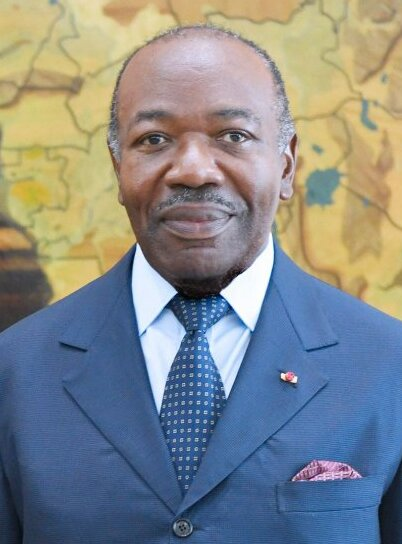
President Ali Bongo, pictured in 2022

The junta later announced the arrest and home detention of Bongo and his eldest son and adviser Noureddin Bongo Valentin, adding that the two were with family and doctors. However, lawyers for Ali Bongo's wife Sylvia Valentin later claimed that Nouredin was being held in an undisclosed location. Valentin herself was reported to be under house arrest, and was later charged with money laundering, receiving stolen goods, forgery and fraud. The President of the National Assembly, Richard Auguste Onouviet, was also arrested by the junta, along with presidential chief of staff Ian Ghislain Ngoulou, his deputy Mohamed Ali Saliou, presidential spokesperson Jessye Ella Ekogha, another presidential adviser and the two top officials in Bongo's Gabonese Democratic Party (PDG). The junta said that they were arrested on charges that included treason, embezzlement, corruption, falsifying the president's signature and drug-trafficking. Trunks, suitcases and bags filled with billions of Central African CFA francs were reportedly seized from their homes, with Ngoulou claiming that some of the money was part of Bongo’s election fund.

Despite his detention, Bongo released a video on social media in which he appeared distressed while pleading for help in English, claiming that he was being held separately from his family while calling on his friends and supporters both in Gabon and around the world to "raise their voice" and "make noise" in response to the coup. Following his appeal, the CEO of a communications firm that helped Bongo during the election said that the military seized the phones of those who were with Bongo.

=== Proclamation of Brice Oligui as interim president ===
Brigadier general Brice Oligui, commander of the Republican Guard, was later installed as interim president by the military junta, and was seen on the shoulders of jubilant army personnel calling him the "president". In an interview with Le Monde, he referred to Bongo as "retired", and said that the military had staged the coup due to discontent that had been growing in the country since Bongo's stroke in 2018, his decision to run for a third term, the disregarding of the country's constitution and the conduct of the election. Oligui promised that the dissolution of state institutions would be only be temporary, pending their reconfiguration into more democratic ones. He also said that the military would move "quickly but surely" to avoid elections that "repeat the same mistakes" by keeping the same people in power.

== Aftermath ==
=== Formation of a new government ===
Oligui's appointment as interim president was confirmed by other generals, and he was formally sworn in as "transitional president" in a ceremony at the Presidential Palace on 4 September. In his inaugural address, he pledged to hold "free, transparent" elections but did not give an exact date as to when, and expressed surprise at international criticism of the coup. He also proposed new electoral legislation, a new penal code, a referendum on a new constitution, and the release of all political prisoners. Among the attendees who arrived were former ministers of Bongo's regime, who were booed by a civilian crowd supporting the junta.

On 7 September, Oligui reappointed Raymond Ndong Sima, who formerly served as prime minister under Ali Bongo before joining the opposition, to head a transitional government comprising personalities from all sides of the political spectrum. In an interview by the BBC, Ndong Sima said he expected elections to be held within two years and ruled out putting Bongo on trial for corruption. On 9 September, he announced the final composition of his cabinet, which included both critics and figures associated with the Bongo regime, military officials and civil society members but excluded members of the Alternance 2023 coalition which fielded Albert Ondo Ossa in the annulled presidential election.

On 11 September, Oligui appointed opposition politician Paulette Missambo to head a transitional Senate. At the same time, he appointed Jean-François Ndongou, a former minister under both Omar and Ali Bongo, to head the transitional National Assembly.

On 13 November, the new government announced that elections for the presidency and the legislature would be held in August 2025. The military government published a transition timetable to be approved in a "national conference" in April 2024, with the timetable including events such as a referendum to adopt a new constitution.

=== Bongo's release and Oligui's election ===
On 6 September, the junta announced that Oligui had authorized the release of Ali Bongo on medical grounds, saying that he was free to leave the country for treatment. Following his release, Bongo moved to his private residence in Libreville. In September 2024, Bongo announced his retirement from politics, while appealing for the release of his wife Sylvia and son Noureddin. He also accepted "sole responsibility" for "failings" under his regime. In November 2024, a referendum on a new constitution was held, with 91.64% of voters voting to approve it.

On 12 April 2025, Oligui was elected president and inaugurated on 3 May. On 16 May, Bongo and his family were released and went to Angola following an agreement between Angolan President João Lourenço and Oligui.

On 12 August 2025, the government issued an amnesty for participants in the coup.

== Reactions ==
=== Domestic ===
Following the announcement of the coup, celebrations broke out in the streets of Libreville and in other cities across the country. The Port of Libreville suspended operations.

A spokesman for the opposition Alternance 2023 coalition thanked the army for standing up to an "electoral coup d'etat" without bloodshed and called on it to finish counting the results of the annulled election and formally recognize the victory of its candidate, Albert Ondo Ossa, adding that it had invited the security forces to take part in discussions "to work out the situation within a patriotic and responsible framework". However, Ondo Ossa himself criticized the coup, calling it "a disappointment", a "family affair" and a "palace revolution", claiming that it had been orchestrated by Ali Bongo's estranged sister Pascaline Bongo and noting that it was led by Oligui, who was also Bongo's cousin. In conjunction with the election, he called the recent events "two coups in one", while continuing to assert himself as the winner in the election. Alternance 2023 later called Oligui's inauguration as transitional president "absurd" and called on the international community to push the military into restoring civilian rule. However, after meeting with Oligui on 5 September, Ondo Ossa called on citizens in an online post "to believe in a better and brighter future" for Gabon.

=== International ===
Moussa Faki, the head of the African Union Commission, condemned the coup and called on Gabon's security forces to "adhere strictly to their republican vocation" and guarantee the safety of Bongo, his family, and members of his government. The bloc suspended Gabon's membership on 31 August. ECOWAS also condemned the coup, with regional power Nigeria expressing alarm over "contagious autocracy" following similar events in the region. The Economic Community of Central African States (ECCAS) also condemned the military use of force and asked for restoration of constitutional order, It also suspended Gabon's membership in the bloc on 5 September and moved its headquarters from Libreville to Malabo, Equatorial Guinea. It later designated Central African Republic President Faustin Archange Touadera to mediate with Oligui, during which the two sides agreed to draft a roadmap towards the restoration of democracy.

The European Union's foreign policy chief Josep Borrell said the coup would increase instability in Africa, calling it a "big issue for Europe". He later condemned the coup, but acknowledged that the preceding election had been marred with irregularities and was an "institutional coup", calling the vote "stolen". Patricia Scotland, the secretary-general of the Commonwealth of Nations, which Gabon joined in 2022, reiterated that the organization's charter clearly stated that "member states must uphold the rule of law and the principles of democracy at all times." United Nations Secretary-General António Guterres condemned the coup as a means to resolve the "post-electoral crisis" in Gabon. He later sent his special envoy to Central Africa, Abdou Abarry, to meet with Oligui on 6 September, during which Abarry told him that the UN would assist Gabon as it made a new start.

French government spokesperson Olivier Véran condemned the coup and called for the results of the annulled election to be respected. Chinese foreign ministry spokesperson Wang Wenbin called for "relevant sides in Gabon to resolve differences peacefully through dialogue", and for ensuring President Bongo's safety is guaranteed. The United Kingdom condemned the coup, calling it "unconstitutional", but also acknowledged flaws during the election. The United States, while formally not referring to the events in Gabon as a "coup", called on "those responsible" for the takeover to "preserve civilian rule." The US Embassy in Gabon advised its citizens to avoid downtown Libreville and areas near the Presidential Palace. On 26 September, the State Department announced that it was suspending several assistance programs to Gabon in response to the coup, with Secretary of State Antony Blinken calling the events an "unconstitutional intervention by members of the country’s military”. Canada also called for a "quick, peaceful" return to democratic and civilian-led rule, while Spanish Defence Minister Margarita Robles said the country would evaluate its involvement in peacekeeping missions in Africa.

The Russian government expressed that they were deeply concerned about the potential military takeover in Gabon and closely watch the latest developments in the Central African country, as announced by Kremlin spokesman Dmitry Peskov. While the Foreign Minister's spokeswoman, Maria Zakharova declared that "Moscow is concerned about the reports on the sharp escalation of the domestic situation in this African country, which is friendly to us. We continue to monitor the situation, we expect it to stabilize soon,"

The French mining firm Eramet, which operates the world's largest manganese mines at Moanda and has 8,000 employees in Gabon, said it was halting all work in the country for security reasons. Eramet shares fell 18% on the morning of the coup.

The coup was also seen to have prompted internal reactions from other countries in Africa. In neighbouring Cameroon, President Paul Biya reshuffled the country's military leadership, while Rwandan President Paul Kagame "accepted the resignation" of a dozen generals and more than 80 other senior military officers. Egypt, in turn, announced that they were closely monitoring the situation in Gabon.

== See also ==
- Coup Belt
- 2023 Nigerien coup d'état
- Françafrique
