= Ondimba =

Ondimba is a surname. Notable people with the surname include:

- Ali Bongo Ondimba (born 1959), Gabonese politician
- Pascaline Bongo Ondimba (born 1957), Gabonese politician
- Sylvia Bongo Ondimba (born 1963), First Lady of Gabon, wife of Ali
