= Ian Ghislain Ngoulou =

Chief of Staff to Ali Bongo
- Succeeded by: Position abolished

Chief of Staff to Noureddin Bongo Valentin
- Preceded by: Position established
- Succeeded by: Position abolished

Personal details
- Born: Franceville, Gabon

Ian Ghislain Ngoulou is a Gabonese politician who served as chief of staff of dictator Ali Bongo until 2023. After the 2023 Gabonese coup d'état, Ngoulou was part of the "Young Team" clique around Bongo's son Noureddin Bongo Valentin, and sentenced to 15 years in prison on embezzlement charges.

== Biography ==
Ngoulou is from Franceville, Haut-Ogooué Province, Gabon. He was part of the Young Team clique surrounding dictator Ali Bongo's son Noureddin Bongo Valentin. Ngoulou was chief of staff to Noureddin, and Gabonese media outlet Depeches 241 said that "everything passed through Ngoulou before reaching Ali Bongo." Between 2019 and 2021, he was a member of the presidential affairs committee of Gabon alongside Noureddin, a close friend of his. Other members of the Young Team thrown in prison after the 2023 Gabonese coup d'état were Mohamed Aliou Saliou, deputy chief of staff to Ali Bongo, Saliou's brother Ismael Oceni, and presidential spokesman Jessye Ella Ekogha. When the putschists entered Ngoulou's home, they discovered him in possession of 4 billion FCFA.

In November 2025, despite repeatedly denying involvement in criminal activities, Ngoulou was sentenced to 15 years in prison. The trial of Ngoulou and the other Young Team members was a political spectacle in Gabon. He was forced to pay a fine of 10 million FCFA and 1.2 billion FCFA in damages.
