= Committee for the Transition and Restoration of Institutions =

Ruling military junta of Gabon

- Comité pour la transition et la restauration des institutions (CTRI)

Overview
- Established: 30 August 2023
- Dissolved: 2 May 2025
- State: Gabon
- Leader: Chairman (Brice Clotaire Oligui Nguema); Spokesperson (Ulrich Manfoumbi)
- Headquarters: Libreville
- Website: https://www.ctrigabon.com/

The Committee for the Transition and Restoration of Institutions (French: Comité pour la transition et la restauration des institutions, CTRI) was the ruling military junta of Gabon. It took power in the 2023 Gabonese coup d'état after annulling the 2023 Gabonese general election.

A dozen of its members declared in the early morning of 30 August that the regime of President Ali Bongo Ondimba had ended. Among them were army colonels and members of the Republican Guard.

The committee was dissolved on 2 May 2025.

== Identified members ==
General Brice Oligui Nguema, a former presidential supporter, helped implement the coup and was installed as transitional president of Gabon.
