= Albert Ondo Ossa =

Gabonese politician (born 1954)

Minister of Scientific Research & Technological Development
- In office 2008–2009
- President: Omar Bongo

Minister of Higher Education and Research
- In office 2007–2008
- President: Omar Bongo

Minister of National Education and Higher Education
- In office 2006–2007
- President: Omar Bongo

Personal details
- Party: Alternance 2023
- Education: Bessieux college; National University of Gabon
- Occupation: Politician

Albert Ondo Ossa is a Gabonese politician, member of civil society and associate professor of economics at Omar Bongo University.

== Career ==
In 1987, Albert Ondo Ossa passed the competitive examination for the faculties of economics and management in Dakar (Senegal). He then went through all the university grades at the Omar Bongo Ondimba University to become from 1988 to 1990 head of the economics department and then in 1990 dean of the faculty of law and economics. In 1993, he founded, within the same university, the Laboratory of Applied Economics (LEA) of which he is the director, and whose journal has been published since 2013. In 1996 he obtained the rank of full professor. This academic career is also characterized by union activism. He was a member of the SNEC (National Union of Teachers and Researchers) from 1990 to 1998. This was the first free union which made a decisive contribution, in 1990 in Gabon.

Albert Ondo Ossa has contributed to and/or conducted work in the sub-region on questions of coordination of budgetary policies, monetary policies, and other economic, social and political issues. He has worked in particular as a consultant to the Ministry of Planning of Gabon and the United Nations on the Gabon 2025 project.

== Political career ==
In 2006, Albert Ondo Ossa joined the government, under the leadership of President Omar Bongo and Prime Minister Jean Eyeghe Ndong. He was successively Minister of National Education and Higher Education (2006), Minister of Higher Education and Research (2007), Minister of Scientific Research & Technological Development (2008) . He was a candidate for the 2009 presidential election following the death of President Omar Bongo Ondimba.

=== 2023 general election and coup ===
In the run-up to the 2023 Gabonese general election held on 26 August, six opposition parties joined together to form Alternance 2023. After discussion in the Alternance 2023 collective, he was chosen as the main opposition candidate against Ali Bongo Ondimba. The election result was annulled following the coup d'état four days later.

Following the coup, Ossa has stated that he wishes for the military to handover power of Gabon to him. He also criticized the coup, calling it "a disappointment", a "family affair" and a "palace revolution", claiming that it had been orchestrated by Bongo's estranged sister Pascaline Bongo and noting that it was led by General Brice Oligui, who was also Bongo's cousin. In conjunction with the election, he called the recent events "two coups in one".
