= Idriss Ngari =

Gabonese politician (1946–2025)

Idriss Ngari (2 April 1946 – 27 May 2025) was a Gabonese politician and army general. A relative of President Omar Bongo, Ngari rose rapidly through the ranks of the army, ultimately serving as Chief of Staff of the Armed Forces from 1984 to 1994. He then held a succession of posts in the government of Gabon, serving as Minister of National Defense from 1994 to 1999, Minister of Transport from 1999 to 2002, Minister of the Interior from 2002 to 2004, Minister of Public Works from 2004 to 2007, Minister of Tourism from 2007 to 2009, and finally as Minister of Health in 2009. Considered one of Gabon's most powerful figures during Omar Bongo's rule, Ngari was a member of the Gabonese Democratic Party (PDG).

== Early life and military career ==
An ethnic Téké, Ngari was born on 2 April 1946 in Ngouoni, located in the Haut-Ogooué Province of eastern Gabon, in 1946. Omar Bongo, who was also a native of Haut-Ogooué, was a maternal uncle of Ngari. Ngari joined the army in 1968 and trained to become an officer, studying in Côte d'Ivoire at the officers' school in Bouaké, as well as at Montpellier in France. Back in Gabon, he rose quickly to very high rank: he was aide-de-camp to the Military Cabinet of President Omar Bongo from 1977 to 1978, Chief of Staff of Ground and Naval Forces from 1978 to 1983, and then Chief of Staff of the Armies from 1983 to 1984.

Ngari was appointed Chief of Staff of the Armed Forces in 1984 and remained in that post for ten years. As Chief of Staff, he ordered commandos from the Presidential Guard to destroy Radio Liberté, an opposition radio station, on 22 February 1994; the destruction of the station led to several weeks of unrest. According to Ngari, the station was inciting violence and hatred and it had to be shut down for the good of the country.

Soon after the destruction of Radio Liberté, President Bongo appointed Ngari to the government as Minister of Defense, Security, and Immigration in March 1994. Given its sensitive status, Bongo was always careful to maintain reliable control over the Defense Ministry; for years he had personally managed the defense portfolio, and beginning in 1981 he entrusted it to family members. Ngari's appointment marked a continuation of that practice.

== Political career ==
As Minister of Defense, Security, and Immigration, Ngari oversaw a January 1995 operation in which about 50,000 illegal immigrants were expelled from Gabon, while about 15,000 were granted legal status and allowed to remain.

A powerful figure in the PDG regime, possessing extensive influence within the military and his own Téké ethnic group, Ngari was close to President Bongo and was considered a rival to Bongo's son, Ali Bongo. He and Ali Bongo competed for political dominance in the Haut-Ogooué Province at the time of the December 1996 parliamentary election. Ngari supported candidates who ran against Ali Bongo's allies in seeking the PDG nominations for parliamentary seats in the province, but his candidates were not successful. Ngari, however, was elected to a seat in the National Assembly.

After the 1996 election, Ngari remained Minister of Defense, Security, and Immigration, and he was assigned additional responsibility for posts and telecommunications on 28 January 1997. However, he was moved to the position of Minister of Transport and the Merchant Marine on 25 January 1999, and his rival, Ali Bongo, was appointed to replace him at the Defense Ministry. President Bongo was reportedly displeased by Ngari's electoral competition with his son in 1996. Rumors suggested that Ngari was deeply frustrated by the 1999 reshuffle, in which he was effectively demoted, for long afterward.

Identified as the leader of "aggressive loyalists" within the PDG regime, Ngari and his supporters resisted the inclusion of more members of the opposition in the government; President Bongo typically endeavored to co-opt opposition parties by offering ministerial portfolios to their leaders. He was again elected to the National Assembly in the December 2001 parliamentary election, and on 27 January 2002 he was moved to the position of Minister of the Interior, Public Security, and Decentralization.

Ngari spent two and a half years as Interior Minister before being appointed Minister of Public Works, Equipment, and Construction on 5 September 2004; he was promoted to the rank of Minister of State, while retaining the same portfolio, on 21 January 2006. In the December 2006 parliamentary election, he was again elected to the National Assembly as a PDG candidate in Haut-Ogooué Province. He was later moved to the post of Minister of Tourism and National Parks on 29 December 2007 and was simultaneously reduced to the rank of ordinary minister. Later, in the government named on 14 January 2009, he was instead appointed Minister of Public Health and Public Hygiene.

Although Ngari, who was associated with the PDG's cacique wing, was disliked by the PDG's reformist (renovateurs) wing, which was headed by Ali Bongo, he was nevertheless considered a potential successor to Omar Bongo. After Omar Bongo died on 8 June 2009, Ngari was considered perhaps the most formidable potential challenger to Ali Bongo in the contest for the PDG's presidential nomination, but he chose not to seek the nomination and it was won by Bongo. It was reported that Ngari briefly considered allying himself with Pierre Mamboundou, an old opponent of Omar Bongo and the PDG, but he nevertheless supported Bongo's campaign.

Amidst the events of mid-2009, Ngari remained in his post as Minister of Public Health. While visiting hospitals on 5 August 2009, he announced that the first known case of the H1N1 flu in Gabon had been found. He said that the patient, a French national, had been quarantined, and he called for vigilance to prevent any outbreak of the disease.

Bongo officially prevailed in the 30 August 2009 presidential election, defeating Mamboundou and an array of other challengers; upon taking office, he immediately dismissed Ngari from the government on 17 October 2009. Ngari's dismissal was part of a major reworking of the state administration, in which many prominent ministers and officials were replaced. Having lost his post in the government, Ngari then took up his seat in the National Assembly, representing Ngouoni.

In the December 2011 parliamentary election, Ndari was re-elected to the National Assembly. He was then elected as Second Vice-President of the National Assembly on 27 February 2012.

== Personal life and death ==
Like Omar and Ali Bongo, Ngari was a Muslim, belonging to a faith that is practised by only a small percentage of the native Gabonese population. He was a member of the Higher Council of Islamic Affairs of Gabon, a body that works to coordinate Islamic activities.

Idriss Ngari died in Morocco on 27 May 2025, at the age of 79.
