= Gabon 24 =

Gabon TV
- Type: Public media
- Country: Gabon
- Broadcast area: Burkina-Faso, Burundi, Benin, Cameroon, Cape Verde, Congo, Ivory Coast, Djibouti, France, Gabon, Gambia, Ghana, Guinea, Guinea Bissau, Equatorial Guinea, Mali, Mauritania, Niger, Nigeria, DRC, Rwanda, Central African Republic, Sierra Leone, Senegal, Chad, Togo
- Transmitters: Canal+ Afrique
- Headquarters: Independence Boulevard, Libreville, Gabon

Ownership
- Owner: Government of Gabon
- Parent: Gabon Television (until 2018)

History
- Launched: May 24, 2016

Links
- Website: gabon24.tv

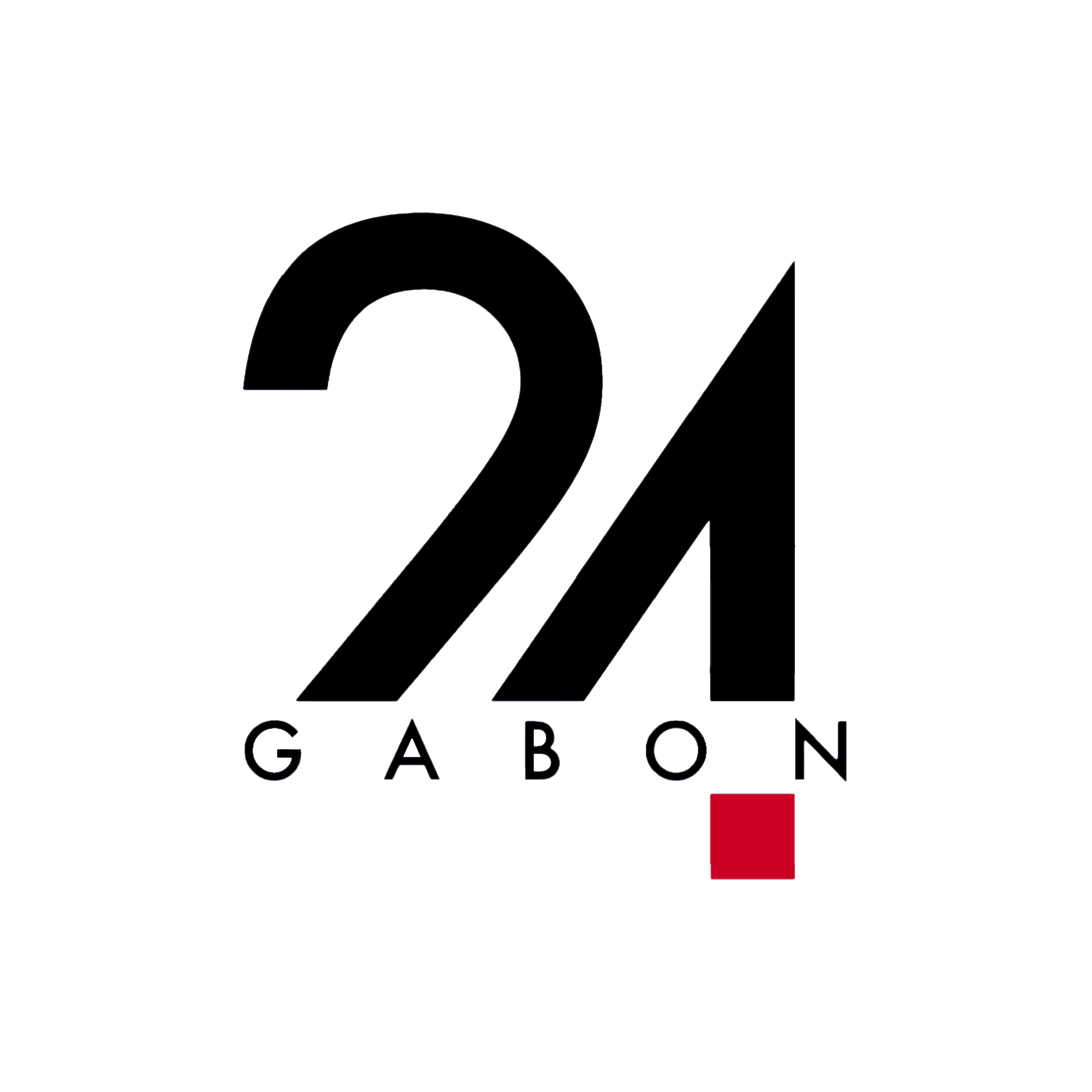
Gabon 24 logo

Gabon 24 is Gabon's first bilingual non-stop news television channel, launched on 24 May 2016. Until May 2018, Gabon 24 was part of the Gabon Télévision group.

Decree 0152 of 4 May 2018 led to the creation, organization and operation of Gabon 24, and detached the channel from the larger Gabon Télévision group, as enshrined in its article 2: "it is created and attached to the Presidency of the Republic, a public establishment, of an administrative nature, endowed with legal personality and financial management autonomy, referred to as Gabon 24."

On the occasion of the Council of Ministers of 26 February 2019, article 2 of decree 0152 was amended, changing the status of Gabon 24 from EPA (public establishment of an administrative nature) to EPIC (public establishment of an industrial and commercial nature).

Broadcast in Gabon on the Canal+ Afrique service, the channel is available in many countries on the African continent as well as Europe.

On 30 August 2023, rebel military officers appeared on Gabon 24 announcing a coup d'état and the arrest of President Ali Bongo Ondimba.

== History ==
=== Subsidiary of the Gabon Television group (2016-2018) ===
Belonging to the Gabon Television group, Gabon 24 was officially launched on 24 May 2016. During the channel's launch ceremony, the president of the Gabonese Republic, Ali Bongo, declared: "This is part of our project to enrich our Gabonese audiovisual landscape. What we want is quality television."

==== Autonomous public service channel (since May 2018) ====
Decree 0152, signed on May 4, 2018, marked the exit of Gabon 24 from the Gabon Television group and the evolution of its status. From then on, a provisional management was put in place, headed by journalists Ali Radjoumba and Marie-Noëlle Ada Meyo, who worked under the supervision of the board of directors of Gabon 24. Mireille Dirat, then director of information and Alex Eboue, then antenna director, were maintained in their post.

A few months later, the Council of Ministers appointed as head of the general management of Gabon 24 Laure Bigourd, whose deputy was Marie-Noëlle Ada Meyo, both graduates of the École supérieure de journalisme de Lille. The Council of Ministers also amended the provisions of Article 2 of Decree 0152, making Gabon 24 a commercial channel: "it is created and attached to the Presidency of the Republic, a public establishment, of an industrial and commercial nature, endowed with legal personality and financial management autonomy, referred to as Gabon 24."

A few days before the Council of Ministers decision, Gabon 24 announced its autonomy via a continuous broadcast, "Gabon 24 is an autonomous public service channel." At the same time, Gabon 24 informed its viewers of the marketing of its advertising space through a commercial spot, broadcast regularly between programmes.

===== Programmes =====
Every day, Gabon 24 broadcasts three blocks of information: from 08:30 – 10:00, from 12:00 – 15:00, and from 18:00 – 20:00. These blocks of information are punctuated by two types of information editions: the small information edition called "the Newspaper" (10-15 minutes) and "the Large edition" (20-26 min ). Each edition of information offers news by touring national, African and international news.

At the same time, Gabon 24 offers a program schedule designed to help viewers understand the news and current events. Other programs cover topics relevant to viewers: politics, health, sport, economy, environment, culture and new technologies.

A variety of programmes are included in the program schedule, including Décryptage, Complément d'infos, 52 minutes avec, Multisports 24, and L'Invité du Jour.

===== Broadcast in English =====
In an effort to reach a global audience, and to be a primary pan-African continuous news channel, Gabon 24 launched its English-speaking desk in October 2019. The desk offers viewers the G24 News, a set format hosted by a team of English-speaking reporters, Interviews with guests are part of the desk programming.

=== Logo ===
The channel uses two logos, one on-air and one for corporate purposes.
