= Victoire Lasseni Duboze =

Gabonese politician

Minister of Family and Social Affairs
- President: Omar Bongo

Member of the National Assembly
- In office 1990–2001

Member of the Senate
- In office 2003–?

Personal details
- Born: 17 November 1956 (age 69) Grand-Bassam, Colony of Ivory Coast, French West Africa
- Occupation: Writer; politician

Victoire Lasseni Duboze (née Issembè; born 17 November 1952) is a Gabonese writer and politician. She served as a member of the National Assembly (1990-2001) and Senate (2003-?), as well as Minister of Family and Social Affairs.

== Biography ==
Victoire Issembè was born on 17 November 1952 in Grand-Bassam (then part of the French colony of Ivory Coast), daughter of Marie-Catherine Azizet Fall Ndiaye and Théophile Issembè. She obtained her baccalaureate A4 in Verneuil-sur-Avre in France in 1973, then pursued higher education with a diplôme universitaire de technologie in applied psychology in 1975, followed by a bachelor's degree in psychology in 1976. After a first professional experience, she resumed her academic path and obtained in 1983 a diplôme d'études approfondies in psychology counseling, with her thesis focusing on psychomotor reflexes in Gabonese people.

Lasseni Duboze served as advisor and Minister of Family and Social Affairs under president Omar Bongo; Gabon Actu called her a "leading figure in the Gabonese Democratic Party". She was also a member of the National Assembly from 1990 to 2001. She was subsequently elected as a municipal councilor for the first arrondissement of Libreville in 2002. She was elected to the Senate of Gabon with 100% support in 2003. She ran in the 2009 Gabonese presidential election, becoming the first woman to run. She made a second run in the 2023 Gabonese presidential election.

In addition to her national government roles, Lasseni Duboze worked for the Association internationale des parlementaires de langue française, where she was special envoy for the for Africa, Vietnam, Lebanon, and Vanuatu, and co-founded their Network of Women Parliamentarians. She is author of Gabonais et Gabonaises, écrivons une nouvelle page de notre histoire.

Lasseni Duboze's accolades include Commander of the National Order of Merit and Officer of the Order of the Equatorial Star, as well as Commander of the Order of La Pléiade, and Chevalier of the Ordre national du Mérite.
