= Paul Okoumba d'Okwatsegue =

Gabonese politician and diplomat (1933–2020)

Paul Okoumba d'Okwatsegue (30 December 1933 – 26 October 2020) was a Gabonese political figure and diplomat. Born in Franceville, Gabon, he was the Director-General of Radio Télévision Gabonaise in 1967. He served as Foreign Minister of Gabon from 1974 to 1976. Later he was elected as Secretary-General of the Agency of Cultural and Technical Cooperation (ACCT), a francophone organization, at an ACCT meeting in Dakar on December 16–17, 1985.

As of 2005, Okoumba d'Okwatsegue was President of the Héritage foundation in Gabon. He died of a lengthy illness in Libreville on 26 October 2020. His wife Agatha, Gabon's first female lawyer, died some months before him.

Preceded by Georges Rawiri	Foreign Minister of Gabon; 1974–1976	Succeeded by Martin Bongo
