= Edith Lucie Bongo =

First Lady of Gabon (1964–2009)

Édith Lucie Bongo Ondimba
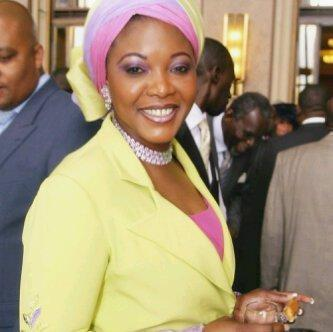

First Lady of Gabon
- In role August 4, 1989 – March 14, 2009
- President: Omar Bongo
- Preceded by: Patience Dabany (as Omar Bongo's first wife) (1987)
- Succeeded by: Sylvia Ajma Valentin

Personal details
- Born: Édith Lucie Sassou Nguesso; March 10, 1964 Brazzaville, Republic of the Congo
- Died: March 14, 2009 (aged 45) Rabat, Morocco
- Party: Democratic
- Spouse: Omar Bongo (m. 1989)
- Children: 2
- Parent: Denis Sassou Nguesso
- Education: Marien Ngouabi University
- Occupation: Physician

Édith Lucie Bongo Ondimba (née Sassou Nguesso; March 10, 1964 – March 14, 2009) was a physician and the First Lady of Gabon as the wife of President Omar Bongo from 1989 to 2009. She was part of the Bongo family.

== Biography ==
Édith Lucie Bongo Ondimba was born March 10, 1964. Her father was Denis Sassou Nguesso, who later served as the President of the Republic of the Congo (1979–1992 and 1997 to date). Her marriage to President Bongo on August 4, 1989, was viewed politically as an example of cooperation between the two countries, according to Reuters.

She studied medicine at Marien Ngouabi University and graduated in 1989. She was a pediatrician, with HIV/AIDS as one of her main focuses. She helped create a forum for African first ladies to fight AIDS and founded associations for vulnerable children and people with disabilities.

== Later life and death ==
In 2009, she was hospitalized in Rabat, Morocco. On March 14, 2009, she died at the hospital, four days after her 45th birthday. The statement announcing her death specified neither the cause of death nor the nature of her illness. She had not appeared in public for around three years preceding her death. After the state funeral in Libreville, Gabon, Édith Bongo's remains were taken to Edu, her father's home village in northern Congo for a traditional Mbochi tribal burial in the family cemetery there on March 20, 2009. The burial, nationally televised in Gabon and Congo, was attended by Presidents Bongo, Sassou Nguesso, and by the presidents of Benin, Central African Republic, Democratic Republic of Congo, Equatorial Guinea and Togo.

Following her death, it was announced on Gabonese television on 6 May 2009 that Omar Bongo was "temporarily suspending his activities" as President in order to "regain strength and rest". The announcement stressed that Bongo had been deeply affected by the illness and death of his wife. President Bongo died a month later on 8 June 2009, nearly three months after Edith's death, at a clinic in Barcelona, Spain.
