= Martin Bongo =

Gabonese politician and diplomat

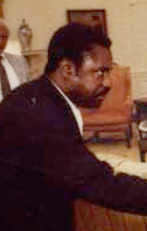
Martin Bongo in 1981

Martin Bongo (July 4, 1940 – 18 November, 2023) was a Gabon political figure and diplomat. He was the Foreign Minister of Gabon from 1976 to 1989.

Bongo, a nephew of President Omar Bongo, was born in Lekei, located in Haut-Ogooué Province. In 1989, President Bongo appointed his son, Ali-Ben Bongo, to succeed Martin Bongo as Minister of Foreign Affairs.

Bongo was the Special Representative of the African Union to the Democratic Republic of Congo as of 2003.

Preceded by Paul Okoumba d'Okwatsegue	Foreign Minister of Gabon; 1976–1989	Succeeded by Ali-Ben Bongo
