= African Adaptation Initiative =

The African Adaptation Initiative (AAI) is an initiative led by African Heads of State "to enhance concrete adaptation action and address loss and damage on the Continent in the context of the implementation of Nationally Determined Contributions (NDCs), the African Union's (AU's) 2063 Agenda and the Sustainable Development Goals (SDGs)".

== History ==
During the 21st Conference of the Parties (COP) in 2015, African heads of state launched the Africa Adaptation Initiative (AAI). The AAI's steering committee is composed of the African Ministerial Conference on Environment (AMCEN) Bureau and the chair of the African Group of Negotiators (AGN).

The Africa Adaptation Initiative is also supported by the European Union. The European Union has partnered with the African Union on the promotion of sustainable resources management, environmental resilience, and climate change mitigation.

== Works ==
1. On January 25, 2021, at the Climate Adaptation Summit 2021, the United Nations Development Programme (UNDP), European Union (EU), and partners of the Africa Adaptation Initiative (AAI) joined forces with governments, businesses, scientists, NGOs, and youth from all over the world to announce the launch of a two-year €1 million grant that will support the Africa Adaptation Initiative.
2. AAI will engage with existing institutions to enhance adaptation activities on the ground. Additionally, AAI will: (i) Increase knowledge about climate adaptation; (ii) Promote collaboration and partnerships (at sub-regional and regional levels) to maximize shared benefits, scale, and create synergy; (iv) Encourage knowledge management, capacity building, and capacity strengthening; (iii) Support and facilitate resource mobilization for implementation; (v) Track progress through monitoring and evaluation of action.
