= Jean-Boniface Assélé =

Gabonese politician

Jean-Boniface Assélé (born 9 February 1939) is a Gabonese politician and the President of the Circle of Liberal Reformers (CLR). He served in the government of Gabon from 1975 to 1990 and again from 2004 to 2009. He was also Commander-in-Chief of the National Police Forces from 1970 to 1989 and held the rank of General. During the September's month 2009, he becomes the Fourth Vice-President of the Senate of Gabon.

== Police command and government service during single-party rule ==
Assélé was born in Akiéni. From 1970 to 1989, he was Commander-in-Chief of the National Police Forces; also during that period, he served as High Commissioner at the Presidency from 1974 to 1975 and was appointed as Secretary of State for Information in 1975. He was then appointed as Minister of National Education later in 1975, and he was retained in the government as Minister of National Education, Youth, Sports and Leisure on 13 July 1977. In 1980 he was moved to the position of Minister of Public Works. At the Third Extraordinary Congress of the Gabonese Democratic Party (PDG) in early March 1983, Assélé was elected to the PDG Central Committee.

For years, Assélé was a brother-in-law of President Omar Bongo as the brother of Bongo's wife Joséphine Kama. He is said to have used his position as head of police to keep watch on his sister and report her "indiscretions" to Bongo. Bongo and Joséphine divorced in 1988. Although Assélé was considered a "long-time and trusted ally" of Bongo, Léon Ossiali was appointed to replace him as Commander-in-Chief of the National Police Forces on 12 January 1989. His removal from that key position was interpreted by some observers as a consequence of Bongo's divorce; another explanation attributed it to a leaflet campaign by the exiled opposition group MORENA, which had smuggled the leaflets into Gabon. Despite being removed from his police command, Assélé remained in his post as Minister of Public Works at that time. After ten years as Minister of Public Works, he was instead appointed as Minister of Water and Forests in February 1990, but he only held that position until April 1990, when he was dismissed from the government.

== Political career after 1990 ==
Assélé was elected to the National Assembly in the 1990 parliamentary election. Together with other members of the PDG, Assélé split from the ruling party in late 1992 and formed the Circle of Liberal Reformers; as a result, he and two others were expelled from the PDG in December 1992. He and the CLR nevertheless allied with the PDG and supported Bongo's candidacy in the December 1993 presidential election. Assélé remained in the National Assembly until the end of the parliamentary term in 1996, and he was re-elected to the National Assembly in the December 1996 parliamentary election, winning the second seat from the Third Arrondissement of Libreville.

In the National Assembly, Assélé was President of the Center of Democrats (CDD) Parliamentary Group, and subsequently he was President of the Group of Republican Democrats (GDR) Parliamentary Group. He was also the Mayor of the Third Arrondissement of Libreville.

=== Return to the government (2004–2009) ===
On 5 September 2004, after 14 years out of the government, Assélé was appointed as Minister of Labor and Employment; as a result he had to step down as Mayor of the Third Arrondissement due to incompatibility of functions. Nevertheless, he was not immediately replaced in his post as Mayor and the situation was somewhat confused; Assélé continued to sign municipal acts due to the lack of a replacement, although the legality of this was unclear.

In 2005, after Zacharie Myboto criticized Bongo in his book J'accuse, Assélé published Incroyable!, a book written in response to J'accuse, criticizing Myboto. Assélé backed Bongo in the November 2005 presidential election and participated in his campaign team as President of the Security Commission. Following Bongo's re-election, Assélé was moved to the post of Minister of the Civil Service, Administrative Reform, and the Modernization of the State on 21 January 2006.

In the December 2006 parliamentary election, Assélé ran for re-election to the second seat from the Third Arrondissement; he was initially declared the winner, but the opposition Union of the Gabonese People (UPG) protested that. On 27 December 2006, the Constitutional Court invalidated Assélé's victory and declared UPG candidate Bernadette Bourobou Koumba the winner with 41.85% of the vote; the results from some polling stations were invalidated because of fraud. Assélé had been continuously elected to that seat since 1990, and his defeat there, in what was considered his stronghold, was viewed as a possible sign of the CLR's declining fortunes. After the Constitutional Court declared Koumba the winner, Assélé called on his supporters to remain calm and refrain from violence or disorder, stressing that Gabon was a state of law; he said that he would appeal to the Constitutional Court for the annulment of the results in his constituency due to irregularities. Following a partial election re-run in June 2007, Assélé expressed anger towards other parties of the Presidential Majority, believing that they were not treating the CLR properly, and he threatened to leave the Presidential Majority. His ministerial portfolio was modified on 28 December 2007, when he was appointed as Minister of the Civil Service and the Modernization of the State.

Assélé was instead appointed as Minister of Communication, Posts, Telecommunications, and New Information Technologies on 4 February 2008, taking office on 7 February. He represented Gabon at a summit of the Economic Community of Central African States (ECCAS) in Kinshasa on 10 March 2008. He was subsequently moved to the position of Minister of Transport and Civil Aviation on 7 October 2008.

On 25 March 2008, Assélé announced his candidacy for the position of Mayor of Libreville as part of the April 2008 local election. In that election, he headed the CLR's candidate list in the Third Arrondissement. After the election, the opposition challenged the results in the Third Arrondissement, but its appeal was rejected by the Constitutional Court.

=== Political activities since 2009 ===
Assélé served in the government for over four years before being dismissed on 14 January 2009. Protesting his exclusion from the government, Assélé called a meeting of the CLR leadership and decided that it was necessary to take steps to increase the party's national prominence; accordingly, he asked that all the party's elected officials refuse to accept secondary positions that were "detrimental to the honor of the party". As a CLR candidate in the Third Arrondissement of Libreville, Assélé was elected as a Senator in the 18 January 2009 Senate election. He was subsequently elected as the Fourth Vice-President of the Senate on 16 February 2009. Assélé was not present for the election of members of the Bureau of the Senate. Because the CLR leadership had already agreed that Assélé would not accept any post in the Bureau of the Senate below that of Third Vice-President, Assélé sent a letter to Senate President Rose Francine Rogombé on 17 February, notifying her that he declined the post of the Fourth Vice-President.

After more than 41 years in power, Omar Bongo died on 8 June 2009. Assélé then urged the parties of the Presidential Majority to unite behind a single candidate for the August 2009 presidential election. The PDG selected Ali Bongo as its candidate; as Ali was a son of Omar Bongo and Joséphine Kama, Assélé was his maternal uncle. Unlike many other leaders of the Presidential Majority, who defected to run their own candidacies or back opposition candidates, Assélé strongly supported Bongo. When the PDG officially launched its campaign in mid-August 2009, Assélé was present for the occasion and declared that the PDG's "true friends" were there, suggesting that false friends were exposed by their absence. At a rally for Bongo in the Third Arrondissement on 27 August, he denounced André Mba Obame, who had left the PDG to run as an independent candidate.

The Senate held another vote for the position of Fourth Vice-President on 15 September 2009, and Assélé was again elected to the post, receiving 80% of the vote. Assélé accepted the post on that occasion, despite his refusal earlier in the year.

Bongo won the presidential election with about 42% of the vote, according to official results, but the opposition alleged fraud and appealed to the Constitutional Court in September 2009. One of the minor opposition candidates, Luc Bengone Nsi of MORENA, filed an appeal based on an accusation that Ali Bongo was an adoptive rather than natural son of Omar Bongo and that he was a Nigerian by birth; because Bongo was born outside of Gabon (in Brazzaville), he would be ineligible for the Presidency if he were not born to Gabonese parents. On 18 September, Assélé reacted furiously to Bengone Nsi's claim and announced plans to sue him over the matter—"To say ... that my nephew is of Nigerian origin is pure defamation"—while vouching for the accuracy of the official version of Bongo's birth: "I affirm that Mr. Ali Bongo Ondimba was born in Brazzaville to father Albert-Bernard Bongo and mother Kama Joséphine in 1959."

In early 2010, the CLR under Assélé's leadership was one of the only significant parties to remain allied with the PDG as part of the Presidential Majority. He led a delegation of political parties supporting President Bongo at a meeting with the latter on 15 December 2010 to discuss the forthcoming parliamentary election and other matters.

Assélé participated in the 2017 national political dialogue as a representative of the majority supporting President Bongo. At the time he was Deputy Mayor of Libreville. At the dialogue he acted one of the majority's two vice-presidents.
