= Mike Jocktane =

Mike Jocktane is a Gabonese Protestant pastor and politician (born 3 July 1972) in Paris. He is the first bishop of Pentecostal and charismatic circles in Gabon.

== Biography ==
=== Family ===
Mike Jocktane is the second of four children. On July 30, 1994, he married Nadia Jasmine Ogowan, with whom he had two daughters and two sons.

=== Educational background ===
Mike Jocktane began his schooling in Port-Gentil in Gabon before becoming a student at the Saint-Aspais high school in Melun where he graduated in 1991.

He then studied economics at the Panthéon-Assas University until 1992. It was at this time that he felt the call of God and joined the United States to follow the teachings of the Christ for the Nations Institute in Dallas where he obtained a certificate of Leadership. He furthered his theological training in Tulsa by completing a Bachelor of Arts in Theology at Oral Roberts University in 1996.

=== A man of faith ===
It was on February 3, 1987, at the age of 14, in the middle of the decade of spiritual Awakening in Gabon, that Mike Jocktane converted and became involved in Christian youth movements.

During his theological studies in the United States, he was ordained Minister of the Gospel on January 17, 1994.

He returned to Gabon in 1996 and in the same year founded the Ministries Christ Revealed to Nations (Ministères Christ Révélé aux Nations) in Port-Gentil, the economic capital. He then extended the Ministries to Libreville, throughout the country and internationally. Today, Christ Revealed to Nations counts a little more than thirty churches in the world.

In 1997, he founded the Nissi Mission in Port-Gentil, the social and humanitarian branch of the Ministries, helping abused children in particular.

He was consecrated bishop on March 22, 2003, by his spiritual father, Archbishop Nicholas Duncan Williams, and by a college of bishops from the Tapac Global congregation who came from England for the occasion. He thus became the first bishop of the Pentecostal and Charismatic circles in Gabon.

=== First steps in politics ===
In 2005, Mike Jocktane was appointed personal adviser and chargé de mission to the President of the Republic, Omar Bongo.

Very involved in local politics of his hometown, Mike Jocktane created the "Rénovons Port-Gentil" association in 2007.

Mike Jocktane was appointed Deputy Cabinet Director to the President of the Republic in January 2009.

=== Covid-19 Pandemic ===
Facing the global coronavirus pandemic which also affects Gabon, Mike Jocktane launches, as early as March 2020, an appeal for the unity of the people and solidarity as well as asking the authorities to implement measures to support the Gabonese people facing the drop of activity due to the preventive measures. It also denounces the opacity of the crisis management and calls on the authorities to be more transparent about the use of the funds to fight the pandemic, in particular through an independent control body.
