= Noureddin Bongo Valentin =

Gabonese politician (born 1992)

General Coordinator of Presidential Affairs
- In office 5 December 2019 – 13 September 2021
- President: Ali Bongo
- Preceded by: Position established
- Succeeded by: Position abolished

Personal details
- Born: 9 March 1992 (age 34)
- Parents: Ali Bongo (father); Sylvia Bongo Ondimba (mother)

Noureddin Bongo Valentin (born 9 March 1992) is a Gabonese politician and businessman who served as General Coordinator of Presidential Affairs of Gabon from 2019 to 2021 under the presidency of his father, Ali Bongo Ondimba. He is the eldest son of former president Ali Bongo Ondimba and former First Lady Sylvia Bongo Ondimba. Educated in the United Kingdom, including at Eton College, he previously worked in the agribusiness sector with Olam Gabon before entering public office.

== Early life and education ==
Bongo Valentin was born on 9 March 1992 in Neuilly-sur-Seine, France. He holds dual Gabonese and French citizenship through his mother. He is a Muslim.

He was educated in the United Kingdom, attending Summer Fields School in Oxford and subsequently Eton College. He then read Politics and International Relations at the School of Oriental and African Studies (SOAS), University of London, graduating in 2014.

== Business career ==
After graduating, Bongo Valentin began his career at Olam International, where he later served as Deputy Chief Executive Officer of Olam Gabon. In 2012, he launched the Mayena Foods restaurant group in Libreville, which included the Don Vincenzo pizzeria. He also founded Shanah Investments, an investment and consultancy firm focused on emerging markets.

Bongo Valentin served as Chairman of the Board of École Ruban Vert, an international school in Libreville, between 2014 and 2018, and as Vice-President of the Sylvia Bongo Ondimba Foundation, a charity supporting women and children in Gabon.

== Political career ==
On 5 December 2019, Bongo Valentin was appointed by his father as General Coordinator of Presidential Affairs, a newly created post within the presidential administration. The appointment followed the stroke suffered by Ali Bongo in 2018, which had significantly affected his capacity to govern. The position was abolished on 13 September 2021 following his departure. According to Africa Intelligence, Bongo Valentin obtained a Gabonese diplomatic passport in the week preceding his departure from office.

During his time in office, Gabon's parliament voted in 2020 to decriminalise same-sex sexual relations, reversing legislation enacted the previous year. The reform was welcomed by UNAIDS and other international human rights organisations.

== Arrest, trial and conviction ==
Bongo Valentin was arrested during the 2023 Gabonese coup d'état on charges including high treason and corruption. He was detained for approximately 20 months before being released in May 2025 and permitted to leave Gabon, in a transfer reported to have been facilitated by the African Union.

On 11–12 November 2025, the Libreville Special Criminal Court convicted Bongo Valentin and his mother in absentia of concealment and embezzlement of public funds, money laundering, criminal association and forgery, and sentenced each to 20 years' imprisonment and a fine of 100 million CFA francs (approximately €152,000). The court additionally ordered them to pay damages exceeding 1.2 trillion CFA francs to the Gabonese state. Prosecutors alleged that the defendants had exploited Ali Bongo's diminished health following his 2018 stroke to control state funds for private benefit. Bongo Valentin, who lives in exile in London, rejected the verdict on social media, stating that he had "never embezzled money" and describing the proceedings as a "legal farce".

== Torture allegations and French proceedings ==
Following his release, Bongo Valentin alleged that he had been subjected to torture and inhumane treatment during his detention in Gabon, including beatings, waterboarding and electrocution at sites including Libreville Central Prison and a facility beneath the presidential palace. His mother has publicly supported these allegations. The Gabonese transitional authorities have denied the allegations.

In July 2025, Bongo Valentin and his mother filed a complaint with French judicial authorities alleging arbitrary detention, sequestration and torture. The complaint, which also names his wife and children as victims in relation to their confinement in Libreville, remains under examination by the Paris tribunal.

His wife Léa and their three children were detained at the family home in the Palmeraie district of Libreville on the night of the coup and were prevented from leaving Gabon until January 2024. Bongo Valentin's brother, Jalil Bongo, told Info241 in February 2025 that Léa "was a hostage with her three children".

== Personal life ==
Bongo Valentin is married to Léa Bongo, a French national, with whom he has three sons. The family resides in London.
