= Gabonese Republican Guard =

Military unit protecting government officials

Republican Guard
- Garde républicaine
- Active: 1960
- Country: Gabon
- Agency: National Gendarmerie of Gabon
- Type: Republican guard
- Role: Protection of government officials and installations
- Headquarters: Libreville

Structure
- Personnel: 2,500

Commanders
- Current commander: Antoine Balekidra

The Gabonese Republican Guard (French: Garde républicaine de gabonaises) is an independent military formation in the Republic of Gabon that is responsible for protection of government officials and buildings. It is the most powerful security unit in Gabon and is responsible for ensuring internal security. It is a directly reporting unit of the National Gendarmerie.

== Description ==
The Republican Guard was organized as the Presidential Guard from 1960 to 1995. President Omar Bongo recruited members of the Presidential Guard from his own Bateke ethnic group. The Presidential Guard is committed daily some 750 people for security missions and 150 for missions normal. Since the death of Bongo in June 2009, the Republican Guard began to maintain a regular presence at every major intersection in Libreville and Bord de Mer, with French advisors being present at the larger intersections. It has close contact in the United States Africa Command East Africa Response Force.

In late 2015, the Republican Guard acquired a Gulfstream G650 for VIP transport. In June of 2025, the Republican Guard's Special Intervention Section, alongside the Gabonese Gendarmerie Tactical Unit and 1st Gabonese Parachute Regiment, the participated in a Joint Combined Exchange Training in Libreville, Gabon that was facilitated the United States Army's 3rd Special Forces Group (Airborne).

=== Coup attempt ===
In 2019, the Republican Guard was at the center of a coup attempt to oust President Ali Bongo's government. Military officers led by Lieutenant Kelly Ondo Obiang announced that they had ousted President Bongo. It deployed armoured vehicles such as Nexter Aravis MRAPs throughout the capital.

The coup was put down by 10:30 am after the Gendarmerie Intervention Group assaulted the Radio Télévision Gabonaise, which was the headquarters of the pro-coup forces.

== Structure ==
The Republican Guard has the following structure:

- Cabinet Com Chef
- Administrative and Financial Services Department
- B1
- B3
- B4
- Directorate General of Special Services
- Logistics Department
- Auto Technical Service
- Regular
- Directorate of Military Health
- Parachute Intervention Group
- Presidential Aerial Group
- Armored Intervention Group
- Material Service
- Fire Section
- Nautical Section
- Libreville Instruction Center
- Signal Service
- 1st Company
- 2nd Company
- 3rd Company
- 4th Company
- Franceville Detachment
- Leconi Detachment
- Close Security Company
- Barracks
- Military Band
- General Corps Service
- Special Intervention Section (SIS)
- Special Response Service

== Commanders ==
- Colonel Brice Oligui Nguema (3 March 2020 – present)

== See also ==
- Ivorian Republican Guard
- Republican Guard (Central African Republic)
- Republican Guard (Guinea)
