= Sylvia Bongo Ondimba =

First Lady of Gabon

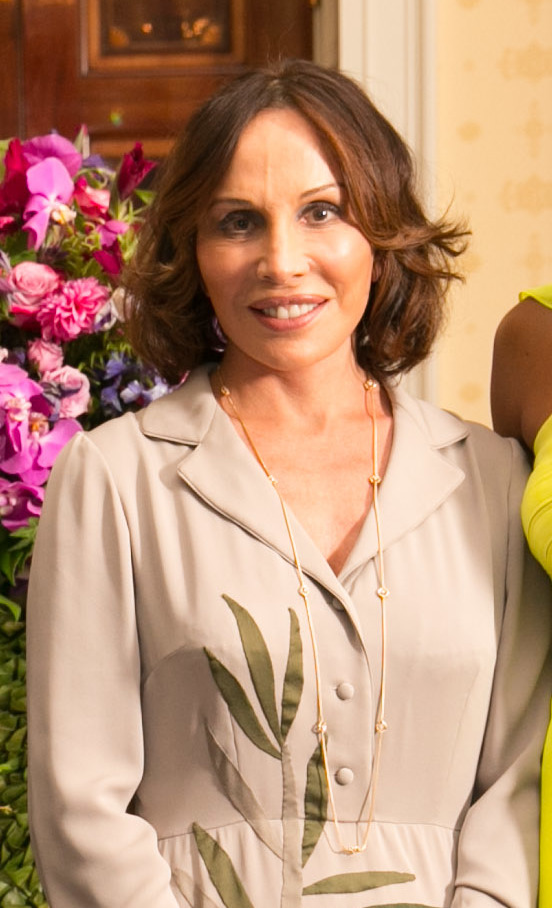
- Bongo Ondimba in 2014

First Lady of Gabon
- In role 16 October 2009 – 30 August 2023
- President: Ali Bongo Ondimba
- Preceded by: Edith Lucie Bongo
- Succeeded by: Zita Nyangue Oligui Nguema

Personal details
- Born: Sylvia Valentin; 11 March 1963 (age 63) Paris, France
- Spouse: Ali Bongo Ondimba (m. 1989)
- Children: Malika; Noureddin; Jalil; Bilal
- Parents: Edouard-Pierre Valentin (father); Evelyne Valentin (mother)
- Profession: President of the "Sylvia Bongo Ondimba Foundation"

Sylvia Valentin Bongo Ondimba is the Former First Lady of Gabon. She has been the wife of former Gabonese dictator Ali Bongo Ondimba since 1989. She became the First Lady of Gabon following the inauguration of her husband as President of Gabon on 16 October 2009 after the death of his father Omar Bongo, Gabon's long-time dictator.

On August 30, 2023, her husband, Ali Bongo, was deposed after 14 years of rule, ending her term as First Lady and subsequently leading to her detention until May 2025. Since then, she has lived in exile in London, United Kingdom. In 2025, a Gabonese court sentenced her in absentia of various corruption-related offenses.

== Family background ==
Born in Paris on 11 March 1963, Sylvia Valentin was barely two months old when her parents were transferred to Douala for work. She is the daughter of Édouard Valentin (died on 28 January 2019), a French businessman who headed the group called Omnium Gabonais d'Assurances et de Réassurances (OGAR, Gabonese Insurance and Reinsurance). Her mother, Évelyne Valentin, then became President Bongo Ondimba's secretary.

Sylvia spent most of her childhood in Cameroon along with her siblings, before the family took up residence in Tunisia.

In 1974, after a long stay by the Valentin family in Tunisia, Sylvia and her parents decided to move to Gabon, where she received an academic and Christian education at the Libreville Immaculate Conception Institution.

In 1988, Sylvia met Ali Bongo Ondimba. They married in 1989. They have three children: Noureddin Edouard, Jalil, and Bilal, adopted by the couple in 2002. Malika is the president's first daughter from a previous relationship.

On 16 October 2009, as Ali Bongo Ondimba was elected president, Sylvia Bongo Ondimba became Gabon's First Lady.

Her grand-children are Elizabeth, Deborah and Dyah Bongo.

== Education ==
Sylvia Bongo Ondimba graduated with an advanced-level degree (DESS) in corporate management in France, and then decided to return to Gabon.

== Career ==
Sylvia Bongo Ondimba was hired and promoted to the post of deputy managing director of the country's largest real estate firm, Gabon Immobilier, where she was named responsible for the company's marketing and economic development.

She created her own wealth management firm, Alliance S.A., at the age of 25.

== The Sylvia Bongo Ondimba Foundation ==
Actions:

- The Sylvia Bongo Ondimba Foundation gave rise to the project known as the caravan through Gabon's hinterland, whose mission was to record the grievances raised by residents of the country's more isolated areas.
- The Sylvia Bongo Ondimba Foundation adopted a resolution to mark 23 June of each year as International Widows' Day, from a project initiated by Sylvia Bongo Ondimba herself.
- In April 2011, the Sylvia Bongo Ondimba Foundation donated to the Gabonese population a total of 18,000 mosquito screens.
- In October 2010, the Sylvia Bongo Ondimba Foundation donated 250 electric scooters, crutches and wheelchairs to benefit several disability assistance associations.
- The Akassi microfinance project sponsored by the Sylvia Bongo Ondimba Foundation and intended to facilitate entrepreneurship among Gabonese women and their families.

== Accusations ==
On September 23, 2023, Sylvia Bongo Ondimba was charged with money laundering by the public prosecutor. On October 11, 2023, she was placed under arrest and incarcerated.

As of December 2024, Sylvia has been released from detention and has gone to Angola. She arrived in Luanda, Angola, with her husband, former president Ali Bongo Ondimba, and their son Noureddin Bongo Valentin. Their release is described as provisional, and a trial for alleged embezzlement is still expected to continue. Lawyers for the family have stated that they suffered torture and abuse during their detention.

On November 11, 2025, Sylvia and Noureddin were convicted of concealment and embezzlement of public funds, money laundering, criminal association and forgery by a special criminal court in Libreville and sentenced to 20 years' imprisonment in absentia.
