= Palais du bord de mer =

Official residence of the president of Gabon

Coordinates: 0.3924°N 9.4420°E

The Palais du bord de mer (English: Seaside Palace) serves as the official residence of the president of Gabon. Located in the capital city of Libreville, it was commissioned by President Omar Bongo and completed in 1977.

The palace was designed by Lebanese-Ivorian architect Pierre Fakhoury.

== History ==
Upon its completion in 1977, the palace was widely regarded as costly and extravagant.

The body of Omar Bongo was laid in state at the palace until his state funeral on 16 June 2009. In August 2023, the Gabonese coup d'état was announced from the palace.
