= Ali Bongo =

President of Gabon from 2009 to 2023

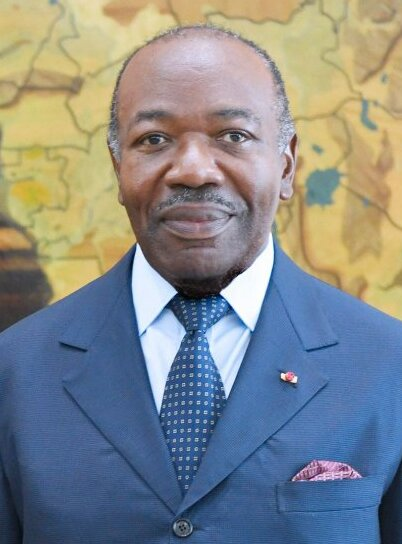
- Bongo in 2022

3rd President of Gabon
- In office 16 October 2009 – 30 August 2023
- Prime Minister: See list: Paul Biyoghé Mba; Raymond Ndong Sima; Daniel Ona Ondo; Emmanuel Issoze-Ngondet; Julien Nkoghe Bekale; Rose Christiane Raponda; Alain Claude Bilie By Nze
- Vice President: See list: Vacant (2009–2017; 2019–2023); Pierre Claver Maganga Moussavou (2017–2019); Rose Christiane Raponda (Jan–Aug 2023)
- Preceded by: Omar Bongo; Rose Francine Rogombé (acting)
- Succeeded by: Brice Oligui Nguema

Minister of National Defense
- In office 25 January 1999 – 15 August 2009
- Prime Minister: Jean-François Ntoutoume Emane; Jean Eyeghé Ndong; Paul Biyoghé Mba
- Preceded by: Idriss Ngari
- Succeeded by: Angélique Ngoma

Deputy of the National Assembly of Gabon
- In office 1990–2009
- Constituency: Haut-Ogooué Province

Minister for Foreign Affairs
- In office 1989–1991
- Prime Minister: Léon Mébiame; Casimir Oyé-Mba
- Preceded by: Martin Bongo
- Succeeded by: Pascaline Bongo Ondimba

Personal details
- Born: Alain-Bernard Bongo; 9 February 1959 (age 67) Brazzaville, then part of French Equatorial Africa
- Party: PDG
- Spouse: Sylvia Valentin
- Children: 3, including Noureddin
- Education: Pantheon-Sorbonne University

Ali Bongo Ondimba (born Alain-Bernard Bongo; 9 February 1959) (Note: Earlier publications in the media prior to his presidency referred to him as Ali Ben Bongo.) is a Gabonese former politician and dictator who was the third president of Gabon from 2009 until he was deposed in a coup in 2023. A member of the Gabonese Democratic Party, Bongo is the son of Omar Bongo, who was president from 1967 until his death in 2009.

During his father's presidency, Bongo was Minister of Foreign Affairs from 1989 to 1991, represented Bongoville as a deputy in the National Assembly from 1991 to 1999, and was the Minister of National Defense from 1999 to 2009. After his father's death, Bongo was elected president in the 2009 presidential election, marking the first political dynasty in the country. He was reelected in 2016, with elections being marred by numerous irregularities, arrests, human rights violations and post-election protests and violence.

On 30 August 2023, following the results of the general election, the military, led by Bongo's cousin Brice Oligui Nguema, ousted him from the presidency in a coup d'état due to lack of transparency in the election process and established a junta called the Committee for the Transition and Restoration of Institutions. He was briefly detained, then released. This effectively made Bongo the first Gabonese president not to die in service.

== Early life and education ==
Alain-Bernard Bongo was born in Brazzaville, as the son of Albert-Bernard Bongo (later Omar Bongo Ondimba) and Marie-Joséphine Kama (later Patience Dabany). His mother was 18 years old at the time of his birth. He was conceived 18 months before their marriage and there have been rumors of his being Bongo's adopted son, a claim that he dismisses. Alain-Bernard converted to Islam along with his father in 1973 and changed his name to Ali. In 2003, they both adopted the Obamba patronymic "Ondimba" in memory of Omar's father, Basile Ondimba.

Bongo was educated at a private school in Neuilly-sur-Seine, France, and then studied law at the Sorbonne. In 2018, he received an honorary doctorate of law degree from Wuhan University in China. In 1977, as Alain Bongo, he released a funk album, A Brand New Man, produced by Charles Bobbit.

== Early political career ==
After graduating from his law course, he entered politics, joining the Gabonese Democratic Party (French: Parti Démocratique Gabonais, abbreviated PDG) in 1981; he was elected to the PDG Central Committee at the party's Third Extraordinary Congress in March 1983. Subsequently, he was his father's Personal Representative to the PDG and in that capacity he entered the PDG Political Bureau in 1984. In September 1986, he was elected to the Political Bureau at an ordinary party congress.

From 1987 to 1989, Bongo held the post of High Personal Representative of the President of the Republic. In 1989, his father appointed him to the government as Minister of Foreign Affairs and Cooperation, replacing Martin Bongo. He was considered a reformist within the ruling PDG in the early 1990s. In the 1990 parliamentary election, the first election after the introduction of multiparty politics, he was elected to the National Assembly as a PDG candidate in Haut-Ogooué Province. After two years as Foreign Minister, a 1991 constitutional amendment setting a minimum age of 35 for ministers resulted in his departure from the government.

In 1991, following his departure from the government, Bongo took up his seat as a Deputy in the National Assembly. In February 1992, he organized a visit by American pop singer Michael Jackson to Gabon.

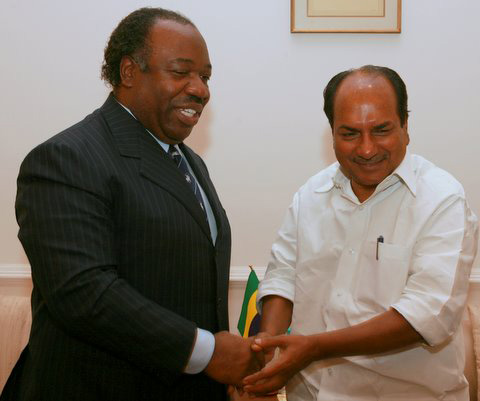
Ali Bongo with Indian Minister of Defence A. K. Antony in New Delhi, 2007

Bongo became President of the Higher Council of Islamic Affairs of Gabon (Conseil supérieur des affaires islamiques du Gabon, CSAIG) in 1996. Prior to the December 1996 parliamentary election, a supporter of Defense Minister Idriss Ngari challenged Bongo for the PDG nomination to his parliamentary seat, but Bongo was successful in winning the nomination and retaining the seat. In surviving that challenge, he benefited from the assistance of his maternal uncle Jean-Boniface Assélé, one of his key political allies. After over seven years as a Deputy, Bongo was appointed to the government as Minister of National Defense on 25 January 1999.

In the December 2001 parliamentary election, Bongo was elected to the National Assembly as a PDG candidate in Haut-Ogooué Province. At the PDG's Eighth Ordinary Congress in July 2003, he was elected as a vice-president of the PDG. During the 2005 presidential election, he worked on his father's re-election campaign as Coordinator-General of Youth. Following that election, he was promoted to the rank of Minister of State on 21 January 2006, while retaining the defense portfolio.

Bongo was re-elected to the National Assembly in the December 2006 parliamentary election as a PDG candidate in Haut-Ogooué Province. He retained his post as Minister of State for National Defense after that election, although he was reduced to the rank of ordinary Minister in December 2007. In September 2008, at the PDG's Ninth Ordinary Congress, he was re-elected as a vice-president of the PDG.

== Presidency (2009–2023) ==
=== Succession and election ===
Omar Bongo died at a Spanish hospital on 8 June 2009. Ali Bongo appeared on television that night to call "for calm and serenity of heart and reverence to preserve the unity and peace so dear to our late father". Having been appointed to key positions by his father, it was widely considered likely that he would emerge as his father's successor following the latter's death in June 2009.

Some press reports predicted a power struggle, suggesting that a "fierce rivalry" existed between Bongo and his sister Pascaline, who was Director of the Presidential Cabinet. The degree of support for Ali Bongo within the PDG leadership was also questioned in the press, and it was argued that many Gabonese "see him as a spoilt child, born in Congo-Brazzaville, brought up in France, hardly able to speak indigenous languages and with the appearance of a hip hop star".

Bongo was one of ten candidates who submitted applications to become the PDG's candidate in the early presidential election, scheduled for 30 August 2009. PDG Deputy Secretary-General Angèle Christine Ondo announced on 16 July that the party leadership had chosen Bongo by consensus as the PDG candidate, although this decision still needed to be formally confirmed at a party congress. An extraordinary PDG congress designated Bongo as the party's candidate on 19 July. He thanked delegates for their choice, saying he was "aware of the legitimate concerns" of the people. He vowed to battle corruption and "redistribute the proceeds of economic growth" as president.

Despite standing as a presidential candidate, Bongo was retained as Minister of Defense in the government appointed on 22 July 2009. Rogombé urged calm and called for the candidates to be "worthy" of the votes they would receive. The opposition strongly protested Bongo's continued inclusion in the government. After Interim President Rose Francine Rogombé said that Bongo would be replaced so that all candidates would be on an equal footing for the election, Interior Minister Jean-François Ndongou was appointed to take over from Bongo as Minister of Defense in an interim capacity when the election campaign officially began on 15 August 2009.

A few days after the election on 30 August 2009, it was announced that he had won the election with 42% of the vote, and that result was promptly confirmed by the Constitutional Court. The opposition rejected the official results, and riots broke out in Gabon's second largest city, Port-Gentil. In response to allegations of fraud, the Constitutional Court conducted a recount before again declaring Bongo the winner with 41.79% of the vote on 12 October 2009.

=== First term ===
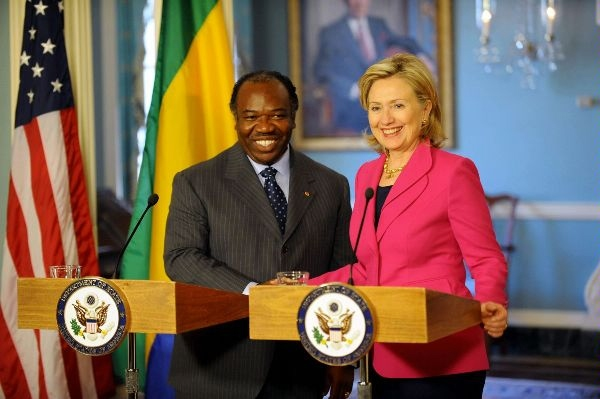
Hillary Clinton meets with Ali Bongo in Washington, 2010.

On 16 October 2009, Ali Bongo was sworn in as president. Various African presidents were present for the ceremony. Bongo expressed a commitment to justice and the fight against corruption at the ceremony and said that fast action was needed to "give back confidence and promote the emergence of new hope". He also alluded to his father's governing philosophy of preserving stability through regional, tribal, and political balance in the allocation of power, while also stressing that "excellence, competence and work" were even more important than "geographical and political considerations".

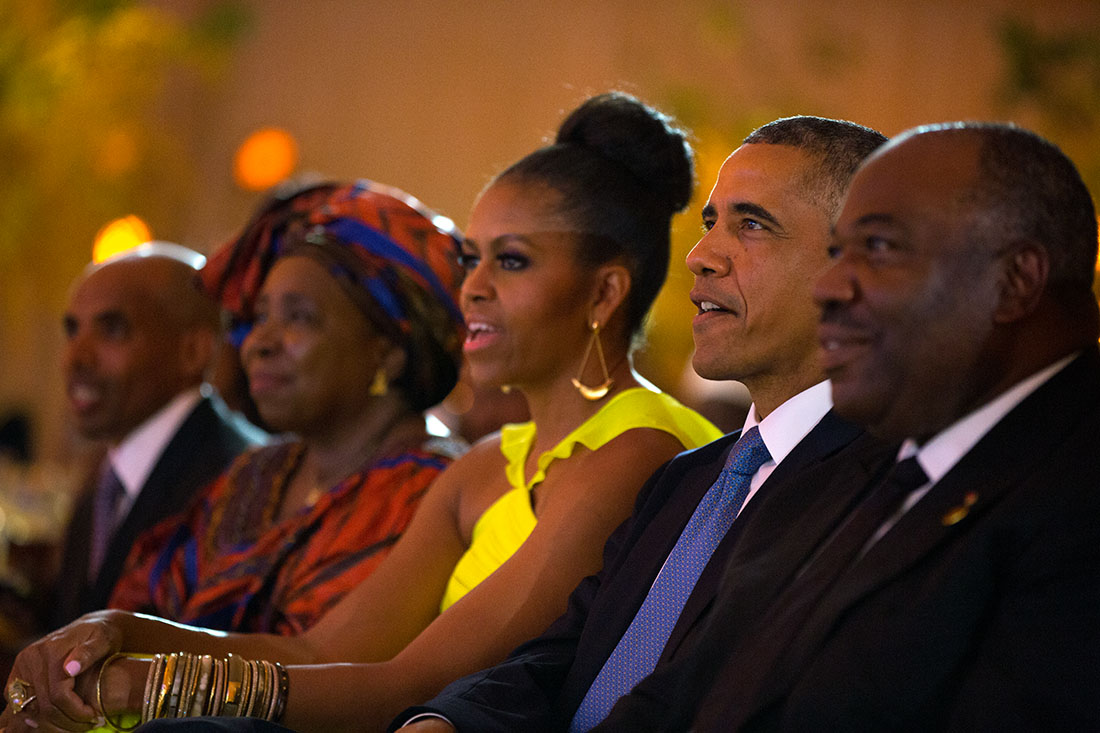
Bongo with Barack and Michelle Obama at a summit in 2014

Later in the day, he announced the reappointment of Paul Biyoghe Mba as Prime Minister. He made the announcement personally "to underline the importance of this moment". According to Bongo, Biyoghe Mba had the necessary experience and managerial competence "to lead us through the next stage", and he said work would start "immediately".

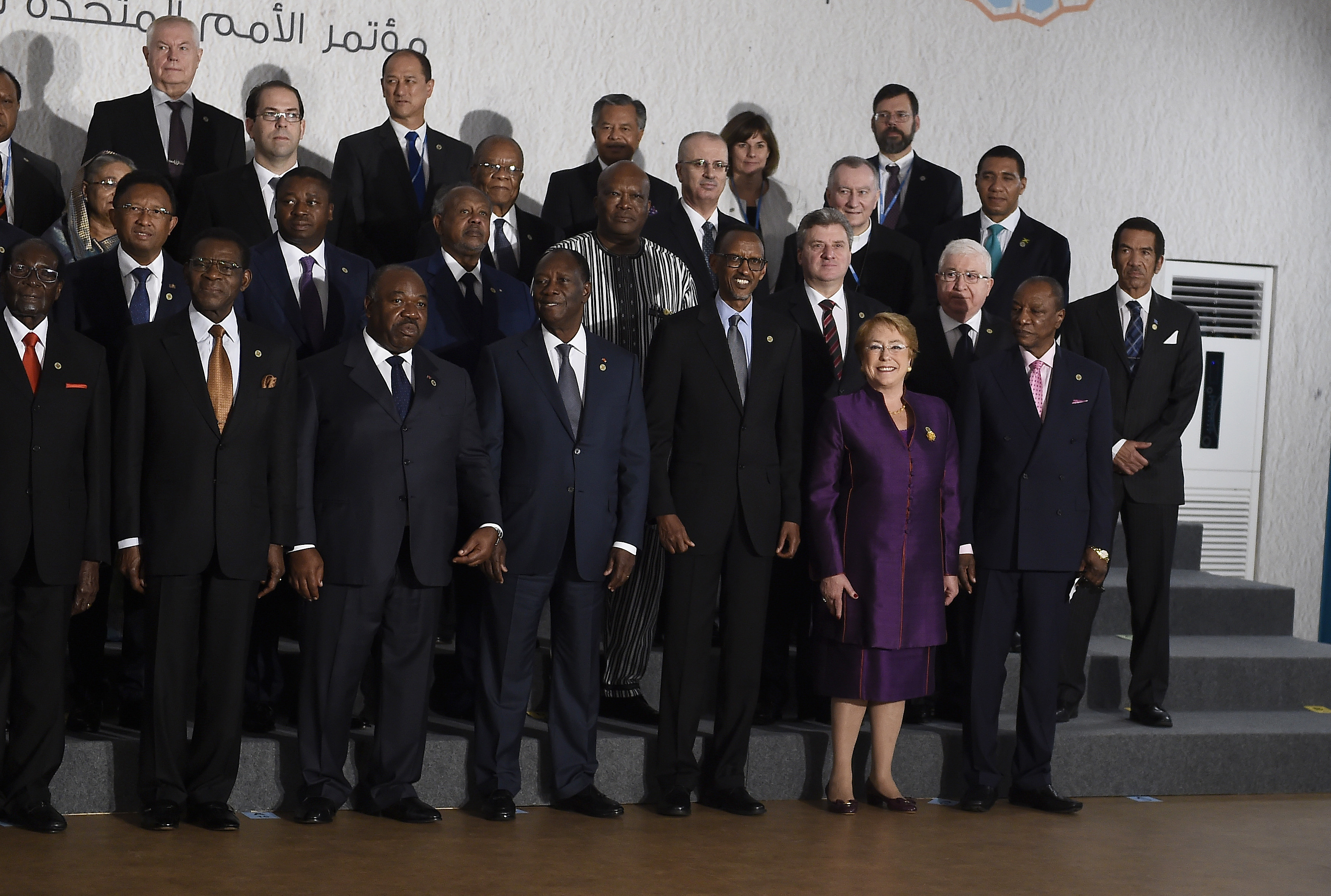
Bongo, third from left, with other state leaders in 2016

On 17 October, the composition of Biyoghe Mba's new government was announced. It was reduced to 30 ministers, fulfilling Bongo's campaign promise to reduce the size of the government and thereby reduce expenses. The government was mostly composed of new faces, including many technocrats, although a few key ministers, such as Paul Toungui (Foreign Minister), Jean-François Ndongou (Interior Minister), and Laure Olga Gondjout (Communications Minister), retained their posts.

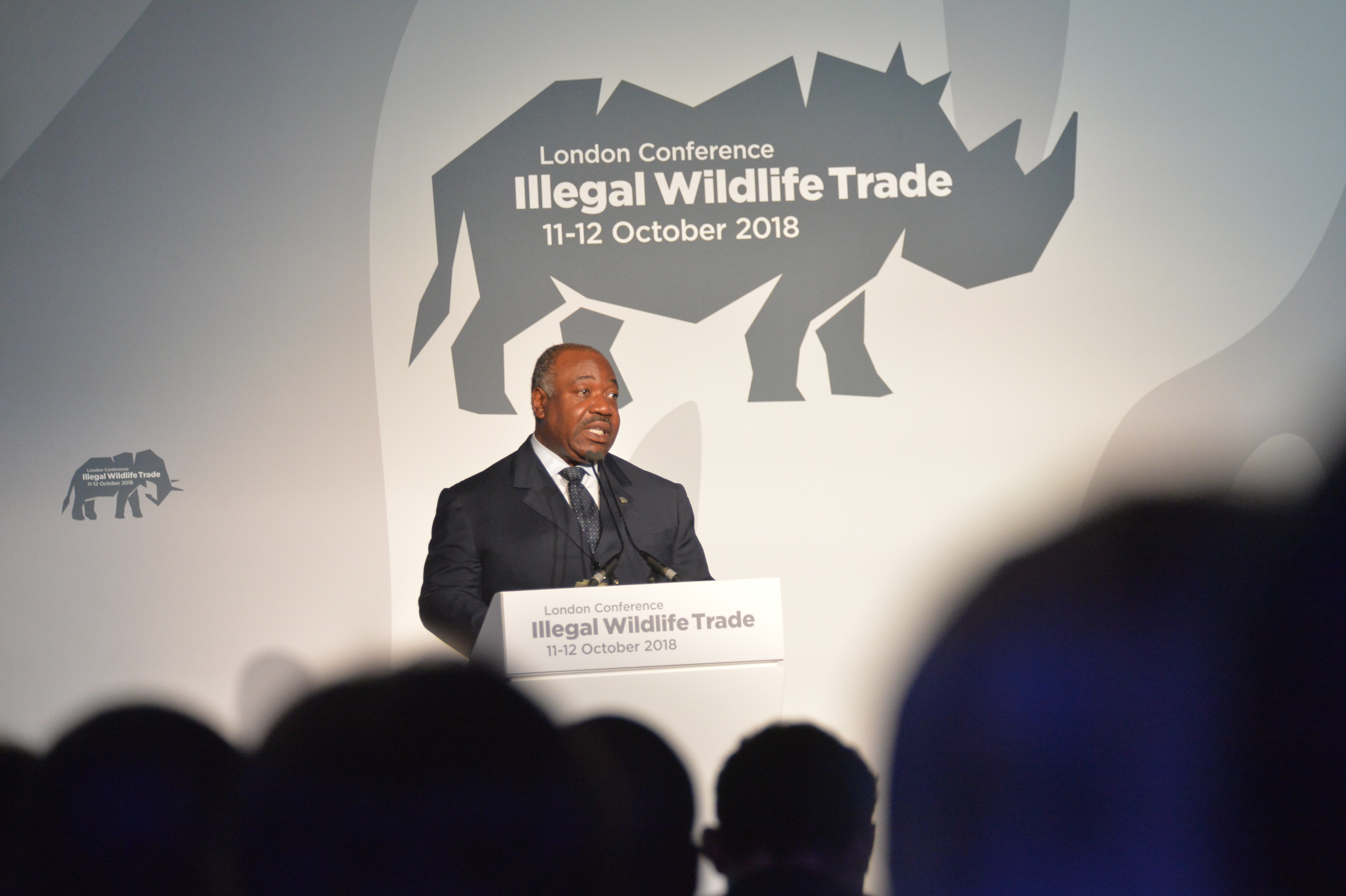
Ali Bongo Ondimba speaking at the Illegal Wildlife Trade Conference in London, October 2018

On 9 June 2011, Ali Bongo and Barack Obama met at the White House.

In 2012, clashes between the supporters of opposition figure André Mba Obame and police occurred in Libreville.

On 17 August 2015, Bongo announced that he planned to donate everything he inherited from his father to the young people of Gabon, in the form of "a foundation for the youth and education". Explaining his decision, he said that "we are all heirs of Omar Bongo Ondimba" and that "no Gabonese must be left by the side of the road".

Gabon's economy continues to be based on a rent strategy, being entirely devoted to the production and export of natural resources. Many difficulties persist in addition: unemployment rate around 30% of the active population in 2016, expeditious arrests during student or union demonstrations (numerous since January 2016), deterioration of access to health care, deficiency of public services, recurrent electricity cuts. More than half of the population is below the poverty line.

=== Second term ===
On 24 October 2018, Bongo was hospitalized in Riyadh for an undisclosed illness. On 29 November 2018 Bongo was transferred to a military hospital in Rabat to continue recovery. On 9 December 2018 it was reported by Gabon's Vice President Pierre Claver Maganga Moussavou that Bongo had a stroke in Riyadh, after leaving hospital he recovered at a private residence in Rabat. From 24 October 2018 to 1 January 2019, Bongo was not seen in public, leading to rampant speculation about the possibility that he may have died or otherwise become incapacitated.

On 1 January 2019, Bongo gave his first public address via a video posted to social media since falling ill in October 2018 quashing rumors of his death. Despite this, many anti-Bongo activists living abroad questioned the legitimacy of the video with some claiming that the man giving the address was not Bongo, but a body double. In August 2019, Bongo made his first public appearance since his stroke. He has appeared in public using a wheelchair on several occasions since his stroke.

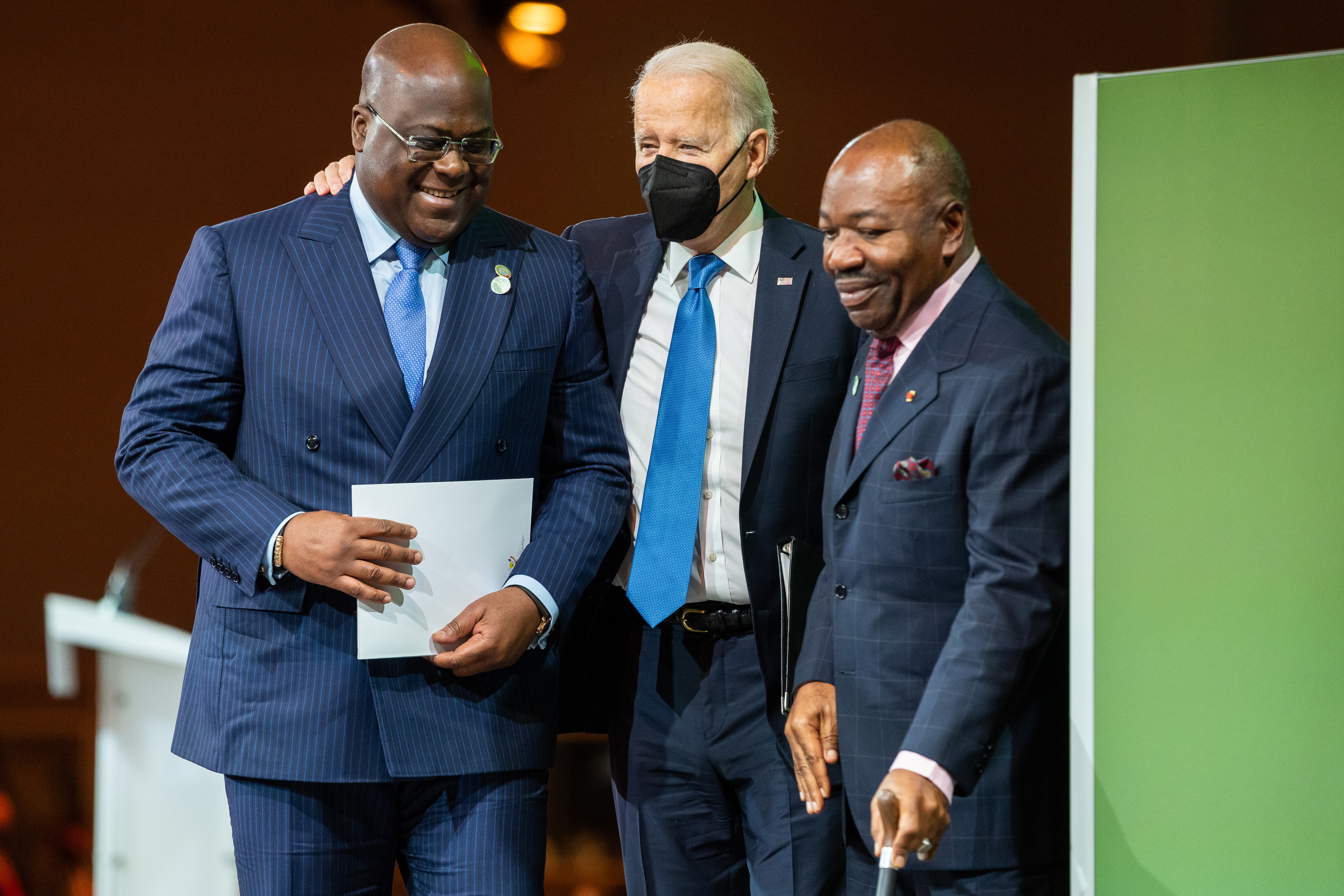
Ondimba with US president Joe Biden and DRC president Felix Tshisekedi on 2 November 2021

On 7 January 2019, soldiers in Gabon launched a coup d'etat attempt. The coup attempt failed, and the government successfully re-asserted control. The coup may not have actually happened though, as has been reported by critics, and could have been used as a tactic by the government to gain support.

As a result of Bongo's medically induced absence from politics, Gabon has witnessed the proliferation of official corruption targeting foreign-owned businesses.

In early January 2020, the Senate and National Assembly passed a constitutional reform that would allow the president to appoint one-third of senators in place of elections, among other changes.

In March 2021, the Global Center on Adaptation (GCA) announced a memorandum of understanding with the African Adaptation Initiative, which it described as being championed by Bongo, to advance climate-adaptation efforts in Africa. GCA's leadership page later listed Bongo as a member of its Advisory Board.

In October 2021, Bongo was named in the Pandora Papers leak as having controlled two shell companies in the British Virgin Islands.

== 2023 election and overthrow ==
In January 2018, both houses of the bicameral Gabonese parliament voted in favor of creating a two-round electoral ballot system, which would replace the single-round, first-past-the-post system used for previous presidential and parliamentary elections in the country. This was later reversed in April 2023, nearly five months prior to the Gabonese general elections, following political consultations in February. Other changes agreed to by the Gabonese government include five-year terms for all elected officials in the country, as well as the abolition of re-election limits.

Roughly one month before the elections, which were scheduled to be held on 26 August, the Gabonese Center for Elections announced a last-minute change to the ballot system that requires voters to support a parliamentary candidate from the same party as their preferred presidential candidate. The leading opposition candidate, Albert Ondo Ossa, is an independent, thereby making it impossible for Gabonese voters to simultaneously vote for him and a parliamentary representative of the multi-party Alternance 2023 opposition coalition, which chose Ossa as their joint candidate.

Foreign media outlets and independent observers were reportedly prevented from entering Gabon on the day of the election. Delays were reported at several polling stations, with people waiting in line for hours before getting the chance to cast their ballots. In the evening after voting took place, the Gabonese government restricted internet access and media broadcasts from French news outlets, and a curfew was imposed.

Just two hours before the polls closed, Ondo Ossa denounced "fraud orchestrated by the Bongo camp". He had already claimed victory and urged Bongo to facilitate a peaceful transfer of power based on his own purported vote count. The official election results were announced in the middle of the night on state television without prior notice. The country was placed under curfew and internet access was cut off throughout the nation, measures implemented by the government to prevent the spread of "false news" and potential violence.

In the early morning of 30 August, Bongo's re-election was declared by the Gabonese electoral commission with 64.27% of the vote. Minutes later, the military seized the Presidential Palace in Libreville and around a dozen military personnel announced the end of Bongo's regime, with a military spokesperson claiming to be speaking on behalf of a "Committee for the Transition and Restoration of Institutions", citing his "irresponsible, unpredictable governance" that had led to "a continuous degradation of social cohesion, risking pushing the country into chaos". They also announced the annulment of the recent election, the dissolution of state institutions, and the closure of the country's borders. Among the officers seen during the announcement were army colonels and members of the Republican Guard.

The junta later announced the arrest and home detention of Bongo and his eldest son and adviser Noureddin Bongo Valentin, adding that the two were with family and doctors. Also arrested by the junta were several of Bongo's presidential aides. The junta said that they were facing charges that included treason, embezzlement, corruption, falsifying the president's signature and drug-trafficking. Despite his detention, Bongo released a video on social media in which he appeared distressed while pleading for help in English, calling on his friends and supporters both in Gabon and around the world to "raise their voice" and "make noise" in response to the coup.

Brice Oligui Nguema, his cousin and commander of the Republican Guard, was later installed as interim president by the military junta. A week after the coup, Oligui authorized Bongo's release on medical grounds, saying that he was free to leave the country for treatment. Following his release, Bongo moved to his private residence in Libreville.

== Post-presidency (2023–present) ==
In September 2024, Bongo announced his retirement from politics, while appealing for the release of his wife Sylvia and son Noureddin. He also accepted "sole responsibility" for "failings" under his regime. In May 2025, Bongo and his family moved to Angola following the announcement of an agreement between President João Lourenço and Oligui, who had since been elected president of Gabon.

In January 2025, the PDG elected Blaise Louembe as its new leader in January 2025 and endorsed Oligui in the 2025 Gabonese presidential election. This was opposed by some party executives and led to the creation of a splinter faction under Ali Akbar Onanga Y’Obégué, who was named by Bongo as the party's rightful leader.

== Personal life ==
Ali Bongo married his first wife, the French-born Sylvia Valentin, in 1989. She is the daughter of Édouard Valentin, CEO of the Omnium gabonais d'assurances et de réassurances (OGAR) insurance company. Édouard Valentin's wife Evelyne works in the secretariat of the presidency, and Édouard is Chargé des affaires sociales at the Gabonese Employers Confederation (Confédération patronale gabonaise, CPG).

In 1994, Ali Bongo married his second wife, American Inge Lynn Collins Bongo, from Los Angeles, California. At the time of Ali Bongo's election as president, Inge Bongo was living on food stamps in California. She filed for divorce in 2015.

He has four children—one daughter, Malika Bongo Ondimba, and three sons, Noureddin Bongo Valentin, Jalil Bongo Ondimba and Bilal Bongo—whom he and Sylvia adopted in 2002.

== Notes ==
Political offices
Preceded by Martin Bongo	Minister of Foreign Affairs; 1989–1991	Succeeded by Pascaline Bongo Ondimba
Preceded by Omar Bongo	President of Gabon; 2009–2023	Succeeded by Brice Clotaire Oligui Nguema (Transitional)
