= Pascaline Bongo Ondimba =

Gabonese politician

High Personal Representative of the President of Gabon
- In office 17 October 2009 – 2 October 2019
- President: Ali Bongo Ondimba

Director of the Presidential Cabinet of Gabon
- In office March 1994 – 17 October 2009
- President: Omar Bongo

Minister for Foreign Affairs
- In office June 1991 – March 1994
- President: Omar Bongo
- Preceded by: Ali Bongo Ondimba
- Succeeded by: Jean Ping

Personal Adviser to the President of Gabon
- In office 1987 – June 1991
- President: Omar Bongo

Personal details
- Born: 10 April 1956 (age 70) Franceville, French Gabon
- Spouse(s): Jean Ping (Previously); Paul Toungui
- Parents: Omar Bongo (father); Louise Mouyabi Moukala (mother)
- Relatives: Ali Bongo Ondimba (half-brother)

Pascaline Mferri Bongo Ondimba (born 10 April 1956) is a Gabonese politician. Under her father, President Omar Bongo, she was Minister of Foreign Affairs from 1992 to 1994 and Director of the Cabinet of the President from 1994 to 2009.

== Background and political career ==
Born at Franceville, Gabon, in 1956, Pascaline Bongo is the eldest daughter of Omar Bongo and Louise Mouyabi Moukala.

Pascaline Bongo was appointed as Personal Adviser to the President of the Republic in 1987 and entered the government as Minister of Foreign Affairs in June 1991. President Bongo had entrusted the Ministry of Foreign Affairs to close relatives since 1981. Pascaline's immediate predecessor in that post was her half-brother Ali Bongo, who was several years younger than Pascaline and had been rendered ineligible for a ministerial post by a constitutional age requirement. In her first address to the United Nations later in 1991, she praised the expulsion of Iraqi forces from Kuwait and expressed concern over violence in South Africa. She welcomed reforms in South Africa, but also stressed that further steps were needed to fully eliminate the apartheid system. Noting the collapse of socialism in the Warsaw Pact countries, she said that the world was witnessing rapid change, but she emphasized Gabon's view that the economic gulf between developed and developing countries—the global "north" and "south"—was "the real problem".

Pascaline Bongo remained Minister of Foreign Affairs until March 1994, when President Bongo appointed Jean Ping to replace her. He appointed Pascaline as Director of the Presidential Cabinet at that time.

Following her father's death in June 2009, her half-brother Ali was elected President; immediately after taking office, Ali moved Pascaline from her post as Director of the Presidential Cabinet to the post of High Personal Representative of the Head of State on 17 October 2009. In the years that followed, Pascaline and Ali reportedly had a contentious relationship. She was removed from office on 2 October 2019.

In October 2023, the Paris prosecutor's office announced that Pascaline Bongo will be tried in early 2024 with the company Egis Route, a subsidiary of the French construction group Egis, and five other people for suspicion of corruption linked to public contracts in Gabon in 2010 and 2011.

== Personal life ==
Pascaline Bongo dated singer Bob Marley from 1980–81, and talked about the relationship in the documentary film Marley (2012).

Pascaline Bongo had a relationship with Jean Ping during the late 1980s and early 1990s; the two had two children. However, Ping was already married and was unwilling to divorce his wife. Ultimately, in 1995, Bongo married Paul Toungui, a prominent member of the government.

Preceded by Ali-Ben Bongo	Foreign Minister of Gabon; 1992–1994	Succeeded by Jean Ping
