= 1999 in Gabon =

- Decades: 1970s; 1980s; 1990s; 2000s; 2010s
- See also: Other events of 1999; Timeline of Gabonese history

Events in the year 1999 in Gabon.

== Incumbents ==
- President: Omar Bongo Ondimba
- Prime Minister: Paulin Obame-Nguema (until 23 January), Jean-François Ntoutoume Emane (from 23 January)

== Events ==
- Gabon of the Future was founded by Sylvestre Oyouomi.
