= 2026 in Gabon =

- Decades: 2000s; 2010s; 2020s
- See also: Other events of 2026; Timeline of Gabonese history

Events in the year 2026 in Gabon.

== Incumbents ==
- President: Brice Clotaire Oligui Nguema
- Prime Minister: Raymond Ndong Sima

== Events ==
=== January ===
- 1 January – President Oligui implements a cabinet reshuffle, resulting in the appointment of Hughes Alexandre Barro Chambrier as vice president.

=== February ===
- 17 February – The High Authority for Communication imposes an indefinite, nationwide blockage of social media platforms, citing societal threats caused by “defamatory, hateful and insulting content”.

=== March ===
- 11 March – The government formally requests a financial programme from the International Monetary Fund (IMF) following an IMF mission to the country, citing the need to stabilise its finances and improve fiscal transparency.

=== April ===
- 15 April – Former prime minister Alain Claude Bilie By Nze is arrested in Libreville on fraud and breach of trust charges over unpaid debts amounting to CFA5 million ($8,999), relating to the National Cultural Festival in 2008.

=== May ===
- 28 May – A court in Libreville convicts ferry company Royal Coast Marine and eight additional defendants over the 2023 Esther Miracle ferry disaster, which involved the deaths of 34 people, sentencing the convicted individuals to 38 months' imprisonment and imposing fines.

=== October ===
- 24 October – Three employees die and two others go missing, as the Prospector 5 offshore drilling rig sinks off the coast of Mayumba during preload activities involving 115 on board.

== Holidays ==
- 1 January – New Year's Day
- 30 March – Eid al-Fitr
- 17 April – Women's Day
- 21 April – Easter Monday
- 1 May – Labour Day
- 29 May – Ascension Day
- 6 June – Eid al-Adha
- 9 June Whit Monday
- 15 August – Assumption Day
- 16–17 August – Independence Day
- 1 November – All Saints Day
- 25 December – Christmas Day

== Deaths ==
- 5 June – Yrondu Musavu-King, 34, footballer (Boulogne, Le Mans, national team).
- 25 July – Jérémie Gustave Nzamba, 66, journalist (Radio Africa).
