= EGF =

EGF may refer to:

- E.G.F., a Gabonese company
- East Grand Forks, Minnesota, a city
- East Garforth railway station in England
- Epidermal growth factor
- Equity Group Foundation, a Kenyan charity
- European Gendarmerie Force, a military unit of the European Union
- European Genetics Foundation, a training organization
- European Globalisation Adjustment Fund
- European Go Federation
- Exponential generating function
- Xinxiang East railway station, China Railway telegraph code EGF
