= 2000 in Gabon =

- Decades: 1980s; 1990s; 2000s; 2010s; 2020s
- See also: Other events of 2000; Timeline of Gabonese history

Events in the year 2000 in Gabon.

== Incumbents ==
- President: Omar Bongo Ondimba
- Prime Minister: Jean-François Ntoutoume Emane

== Events ==
- March 12 – The country competed at the 2000 Summer Olympics in Sydney, Australia.
- September 20 – E.G.F. civil engineering company is founded.
