= RCI =

RCI may refer to one of the following.

- RCI (company), a Timeshare Exchange Company
- RCI Engineering, a manufacturer of agricultural equipment, including the Ag-Bag product line
- Racer's Choice Inc., a manufacturer of racing automotive products, Texas, USA
- Radio Canada International, international broadcasting service of the Canadian Broadcasting Corporation
- Radio Caraïbes International, a radio station in Martinique and Guadeloupe
- Radio Caribbean International, a radio station in St. Lucia
- Random coil index, a predictor of protein flexibility
- Rapid Continuous Improvement, a process improvement practice based on the Japanese concept of Kaizen
- Rehabilitation Council of India, an Indian council for the disabled
- Renault Crédit International, former name of the French company RCI Banque
- Research Centre Imarat, an Indian defence laboratory under DRDO responsible for the development of missiles. (See IGMDP)
- Residential/Commercial/Industrial Meter - a common metric in City Building computer games
- Revival Centres International, a Pentecostal church founded in Australia
- Revolutionary Communist International, a network of Trotskyist parties in several dozen countries
- Riverside College, Inc., a medical college in the Philippines
- Roadway Characteristics Inventory, a database containing information on roads
- Rogers Communications Inc., a Canadian communications company
- Royal Canadian Institute, an organization dedicated to the advancement of science.
- Royal Caribbean International, a cruise line based in Florida, USA
