= 2023 in Gabon =

- Decades: 2000s; 2010s; 2020s
- See also: Other events of 2023; Timeline of Gabonese history

Events in the year 2023 in Gabon.

== Incumbents ==
- President:
  - Ali Bongo Ondimba
  - Brice Clotaire Oligui Nguema
- Prime Minister:
  - Rose Christiane Ossouka Raponda (until 9 January);
  - Alain Claude Bilie By Nze
  - Raymond Ndong Sima

== Events ==
Ongoing: COVID-19 pandemic in Gabon

- 9 January – Gabonese president Ali Bongo Ondimba names Alain Claude Bilie By Nze as the new prime minister and head of government, replacing Rose Christiane Raponda after Ondimba issued a presidential decree.
- 26 August – 2023 Gabonese general election:
  - Gabonese citizens vote for a president and members of the parliament.
  - The government imposes a nightly curfew and suspends internet access following the closure of polls, citing the need to prevent violence and misinformation.
- 30 August – 2023 Gabonese coup d'état: Officers of the Gabonese military undertake a military coup, dissolving the government, closing all borders, and annulling the results of the general election after Ali Bongo Ondimba is declared the winner.
- 2 September – Gabon's military government reopens the country's borders, three days after its closure.
- 12 October – Sylvia Bongo Ondimba, the former first lady of Gabon, is jailed by the ruling military junta.

== Deaths ==
- 10 January – Alain da Costa, 87, football manager (USM Libreville, Vantour Mangoungou, national team).
- 20 January – Michael Moussa Adamo, 62, politician, minister of foreign affairs (since 2022).
- 25 February – François Engongah Owono, 77, politician, MP (2001–2006).
- 11 December – Paulin Obame-Nguema, 88, politician, prime minister (1994–1999).
