= 1997 in Gabon =

- Decades: 1970s; 1980s; 1990s; 2000s; 2010s
- See also: Other events of 1997; Timeline of Gabonese history

Events in the year 1997 in Gabon.

== Incumbents ==
- President: Omar Bongo Ondimba
- Prime Minister: Paulin Obame-Nguema

== Events ==
- The Synod of the Evangelical Church of Gabon was formed.
