= 1995 in Gabon =

- Decades: 1970s; 1980s; 1990s; 2000s; 2010s
- See also: Other events of 1995; Timeline of Gabonese history

Events in the year 1995 in Gabon.

== Incumbents ==
- President: Omar Bongo Ondimba
- Prime Minister: Paulin Obame-Nguema

== Events ==
- 23 July – A constitutional referendum was held in the country.
