= Telefrance USA =

Defunct French-language American cable television network

- Country: United States
- Broadcast area: Nationwide
- Headquarters: New York City

Programming
- Languages: French, English
- Picture format: 480i (SDTV)

Ownership
- Owner: Gaumont; Radio Monte-Carlo; SOFIRAD

History
- Launched: September 1976
- Closed: September 30, 1983

Telefrance USA was a satellite-fed cable television network in the United States dedicated to highbrow French programming, featuring original productions and feature films. It originated as a local cable service in New York before becoming a national service distributed by the Satellite Program Network, which broadcast its block on its transponder. The channel shut down due to economic downturns in 1983.

== History ==
Telefrance started broadcasting in May 1976 under the initiative of Jean-Claude Baker, who, upon arriving to the city in 1973, noticed the lack of French programming in New York, in contrast to other ethnic groups who had language-specific programming on cable. At the time, the three television channels in France (TF1, Antenne 2 and FR3) carried a sizeable amount of American imports with French dubbing in their schedules. Baker, inspired by the idea of how the Statue of Liberty was gifted by the French, created, in the year of the country's Bicentennial celebrations, a cable service in the Manhattan area, on TelePrompTer and Manhattan Cable's systems. The service started broadcasting in September, initially being carried on public access and leased access cable channels, before, by 1979, broadcasting its services two nights a week: two hours on Thursdays and three on Sundays. New York Times TV critic John O'Connor gave a positive review of the service, calling it "one of the most ambitious and sophisticated weekly series to be found on television".

The channel was bilingual; some programs were in English, others in French with English subtitles. Its programming consisted of imported French films, mostly classic; original productions catering the French population of the US and contemporary (three or four years prior to the date of broadcast) television programs. No light entertainment such as game shows or soap operas were scheduled. In 1977, Sofirad, who funded Radio Monte-Carlo and Europe 1, bought a controlling stake, followed in 1978 by Gaumont - at the time Europe's largest film producer. Baker only held 10% of the capital; the company had a deficit of US$150,000, for a capital of US$300,000.

The channel was picked up by the Satellite Program Network of Tulsa in May 1979, becoming a nationwide service. By 1982, it was delivered to 370 cable systems across the US, being SPN's largest contributor of programming in 1982. The station's programming was delivered on Satcom 1, to at least five million households, totalling 20 million potential viewers. Aside from SPN, it also rented another transponder at the Modern Satellite Network, at the cost of $2 to 3 million per year. Advertising rates were fixed at US$1,200 per minute, compared to US$250,000 for the three largest networks. The total budget was of US$2,000,000.

A two hour program on Josephine Baker (Ladies and Gentlemen: the legendary Josephine Baker), from whom Jean-Claude took her surname, won a CableACE award at its 1980 ceremony in Dallas on May 22, 1980, in the award for Cablecasting Excellence.

Longtime host Baker left Telefrance USA in 1981 by mutual agreement. Existing segments were handled by new hosts; in October, the service was scheduled to increase its programming and improve its image. Baker's exit caused Gaumont to solidify its shares, along with Sofirad. The service was set to expand to six hours a day from March 1983, up from five hours. The channel also announced the increase in advertising time from three to four minutes per hour to seven.

Per a survey conducted by the channel, 92% of its viewers near the end of its existence were interested in French culture, with a very small proportion of 3% being made up of French viewers.

Financial problems from Gaumont, the primary shareholder, led to a crisis in 1983, which included a possible plan to downsize operations and cut in lease fees that ultimately led to its shutdown on September 30 the same year. Ahead of its shutdown, it was announced that broadcasts were being downsized due to failing revenues. Gaumont was also facing other losses, with its Italian subsidiary losing ground to private television stations, selling its Brazilian subsidiary, the 51% share in Le Point and ending its joint-venture with Columbia Pictures. Attempts at finding new partners ended up being fruitless. There were talks of the name being acquired for a local production company, but this would have needed Gaumont and Sofirad's consent.
