= 2020 in Gabon =

- Decades: 2000s; 2010s; 2020s
- See also: Other events of 2020; Timeline of Gabonese history

== Incumbents ==
- President: Ali Bongo Ondimba
- Prime minister: Julien Nkoghe Bekale (until July 16), Rose Christiane Ossouka Raponda (from July 16)

== Events ==
- March 12 – The first case of COVID-19 in the country is reported.
- March 17 – Two additional cases were confirmed in the country, including a woman who works at the Ministry of Foreign Affairs. She had visited Marseille and Paris before returning to the country. The other patient, a 29-year-old border police officer working at the Leon Mba Libreville International Airport, had checked the passport of the Ministry of Foreign Affairs employee when she arrived from France on March 8.
- March 20 – The first COVID-19 death in the country was confirmed.
- March 24 – Diagnosed cases increased to six with the Ministry of Health announcing two new cases: a 45-year-old Togolese national, resident of Gabon and recently returned from Senegal on March 11, and a 42-year-old Gabonese national returned from France, on March 19.
- July 17 – Rose Christiane Raponda is appointed Gabon′s first female prime minister.
- December 29 – Parliament approves constitutional changes to fill a legal void if the president becomes incapacitated and grant heads of state immunity after they leave office.

== See also ==
- 2020 in Middle Africa
- COVID-19 pandemic in Gabon
- COVID-19 pandemic in Africa
