= 2002 in Gabon =

- Decades: 1980s; 1990s; 2000s; 2010s; 2020s
- See also: Other events of 2002; Timeline of Gabonese history

Events in the year 2002 in Gabon.

== Incumbents ==
- President: Omar Bongo Ondimba
- Prime Minister: Jean-François Ntoutoume Emane

== Events ==
- The Akanda National Park was set up in the country.
