= 1994 in Gabon =

- Decades: 1970s; 1980s; 1990s; 2000s; 2010s
- See also: Other events of 1994; Timeline of Gabonese history

Events in the year 1994 in Gabon.

== Incumbents ==
- President: Omar Bongo Ondimba
- Prime Minister: Casimir Oyé-Mba (until 2 November), Paulin Obame-Nguema (from 2 November)

== Events ==
- The Common Movement for Development was founded by Paul Biyoghé Mba.
