= Trade Act of 2002 =

United States trade law

- Enacted by: the 107th United States Congress

Citations
- Statutes at Large: 116 Stat. 933

Legislative history
- Introduced in the House by Philip Crane on October 3, 2001; Passed the House on November 16, 2001; Passed the Senate on May 23, 2002; Signed into law by President George W. Bush on August 6, 2002

The Trade Act of 2002 renewed the President of the United States authority of Trade Promotion Authority for the first time since 1994. Trade Promotion Authority allowed the President to negotiate trade agreements without Congress, limiting them to simply passing the trade deal or rejecting it. This process ensured that Congress was able to retain its constitutional authority to regulate commerce while providing the president with the power to negotiation trade deals at a more efficient pace.

The Trade Act also implemented changes to other trade programs, such as the Trade Adjustment Assistance (TAA) which provided more benefits for those who have been affected/ displaced by global trade, renewing and expanding the Andean Trade Preference Act and renaming it to the Andean Trade Promotion and Drug Eradication Act (ATPDEA).

The act was passed by the 107th United States Congress and Signed into law by President George W. Bush on August 6, 2002. The act played a big role in shaping U.S. trade policy during early 2000's as trade deals became easier to negotiate due to the trust from American trading partners due to the implementation of TPA.

== Background ==
Trade Promotion Authority expired in 1994, shortly after the United States passed the Uruguay Round trade agreements. For the next seven years, Congress was not able to renew TPA due to political divide between both parities and disagreements over labor and environmental protections. This was a major blow for the United States and its trade goals since "Our trading partners have expressed an unwillingness to negotiate without some assurances that the Congress will consider the agreements within a definite time frame."

The last President to have the powers of TPA was President Bill Clinton, who used it to implement the North American Free Trade Agreement and the Uruguay Round of the General Agreement on Tariffs and Trade. With the early 2000's and the devastating event of 9/11, concerns about the U.S.'s global position started to increase along with worries about how globalization had started to affect U.S. workers, foreign competition, and the lack of new trade deals. From 1994 and 2002, no new major trade deals were negotiated or passed due to the little confidence in the United States from global trading partners. This stemmed from their reluctancy to negotiate as most agreed upon trade deals were picked apart by Congress, removing and adding certain things, which would then lead to the entire agreement collapsing.

Originally, the Trade Act of 2002 other wise known as H.R. 3009 was a smaller bill that was centered around expanding the Andean Trade Preference Act. When the bill got to the Senate, it became much larger than the original package which would include the renewal of TPA, TAA, along with the aforementioned changes to the ATPA. These additions to the act turned it from a relatively small trade bill and change into a major overhaul that would set the stage for President Bush's trade policy and goals for the rest of his presidency.

== Legislative History ==
H.R. 3009 was introduced by Congressmen Phil Crane of Illinois. After it passed in the House of Representatives, it made its way to the Senate where it went major overhaul of trade policies which would then lead to the creation of a completely different bill which included TPA and an expanded TAA program. The two chambers, which were split with the House of Representatives controlled by the Republicans and the Senate controlled by the Democrats disagreed heavily on these programs. Republicans worried about the cost, while Democrats worried about not having enough protections for the workers affected by global trade in the bill. The differences were too large for a simple back and forth vote and required a conference committee in order to hash out details and reach a compromise supported by both parties.

Throughout these negotiations, select members in the House and Senate debated the structure of programs such as the TAA and the process for renewing FTA. Democrats weren't going to budge on worker protections and assistance, while Republicans, most notably President Bush, who needed a policy victory, needed FTA in order to succeed with trade. After long negotiations, both parties in the end reached a compromise. It was then sent to the House where it passed 215- 212 mostly along party lines with a few defecting to the other sides. On August 1, it was up for a vote in the Senate, where had a more comfortable vote where it passed 64-34. A few days later, on August 6, 2002, President Bush signed the act into law granting him Fast Track Authority.

== Major Provisions ==
=== Trade Promotion Authority (TPA) ===
Renewed Fast Track Authority for the first time in seven years. This would allow the President to negotiate trade agreements with certain procedures. Under this process, Congress must consider a trade agreement with rules such as mandatory deadlines, limited debate, no added amendment's. This law in return would require the President to notify Congress of various points of negotiations such as the start of the talks and even to the final agreement.

Trade Adjustment Assistance (TAA)

The Trade Adjustment Assistance program was one of the most heavily debated parts of the Trade Act. Congress spent months arguing over how much support should be given to workers who were displaced by trade. As part of the act, the expanded TAA covered job training programs, income support, reemployment services, and the most conflicted part of the new expansion of the TAA, the Health Coverage Tax Credit (HCTC), which paid 65% of a displaced workers health insurance cost. The expansion " profoundly changed the nature and scope of U.S. policy for addressing dislocations of workers caused by trade." This not only broadened who was able to qualify for assistance but significantly increased the level of assistance that displaced workers received. Congressional Democrats advocated for expanded and stronger assistance, while many Republicans argued against that these expansions were too costly. These disagreements over increased benefits and assistance caused negotiations to slow down which in turn delayed progress on the bill. In the end, the final version of the Trade Act included the expanded version of the TAA program and increased assistance for displaced workers.

Andean Trade Promotion and Drug Eradication Act (ATPDEA)

The Andean Trade Promotion Act, which was later renamed to the Andean Trade Promotion and Drug Eradication Act, provided access to the U.S. market for exports coming from the Colombia, Peru, Bolivia, and Ecuador. All the aforementioned nations share the Andes mountain range. This expanded on the original act when it was known as the Andean Trade Promotion Act (ATP) by adding more products that could be exported free tariffs to the U.S. that were not eligible under the original and previous program such as textiles and agricultural goods amongst other exports. The new act added “around 700 products to the original list,” increasing the number of exports that could enter the U.S. market tariff free.

The expansion of the ATP was not just solely about trade but had a wider strategic goal. The new ATPDEA was going to be used as a way to help combat the coca production by supporting economic growth in the Andes region which would create legal work alternatives for those who depended on coca production. Many of the citizens of the rural areas where coca was cultivated were extremely poor, faced food shortages, dealt with a lack of employment opportunities or were just flat out underemployed. In these regions, people earned far more from coca related work compared to those growing legal crops, which made the coca/illegal drug industry far more appealing. By giving these countries easier access to the U.S. markets, it would help provide more legal industries which would in turn help provide legal employment, which would ultimately reduce the pressure on relying on the cultivation of coca.

== Support and Opposition ==
The Trade Act of 2002 was controversial and drew attention from both supporters and opponents of the bill and what it was meant to accomplish. The support for the bill mostly came from President George W. Bush and Republicans In Congress. They argued that the renewing the Trade Promotion Authority would help boost the U.S. economy and open new markets as new trade deals were getting agreed upon. Supporters of the act believed it provide the President the flexibility he needed to be able to complete a trade deal efficiently while also maintaining the confidence of foreign trading partners.

Opposition mostly came from Democrats, labor unions, and environmental groups. They argued that expanding trade without provisions that would provide stronger labor and environmental protections would lead to significant job loss across the country. Opponents of TPA also worried that fast track would also give the President more power and limit Congress's ability to have an input in trade deals that would negatively affect jobs for domestic workers.

== See also ==
- Fast track (trade) for detailed history
