= 2006 in Gabon =

- Decades: 1980s; 1990s; 2000s; 2010s; 2020s
- See also: Other events of 2006; Timeline of Gabonese history

Events in the year 2006 in Gabon.

== Incumbents ==
- President: Omar Bongo Ondimba
- Prime Minister: Jean-François Ntoutoume Emane (until 20 January), Jean Eyeghé Ndong (from 20 January)

== Events ==
- 17 December – Parliamentary elections were held in the country.
