= Africa Radio =

- Paris and Libreville; France and Gabon
- Broadcast area: France and Françafrique

Programming
- Language: French
- Format: News and talk

Ownership
- Owner: Libya African Portfolio (52%); State of Gabon (35%); Private shareholders (13%)

History
- First air date: 7 February 1981; 45 years ago
- Former call signs: Africa n° 1 (1981–2019)

Links
- Website: www.africaradio.com

Africa Radio, formerly known as Africa nº 1 (in reference to its former sister station Europe 1 which the station was modelled after) is a French-African radio station founded in 1981 in Gabon with an FM transmitter network covering several Francophone African cities and France. The team, as of late July 2019, consisted of thirteen journalists and presenters, among them Cameroonian saxophonist and singer Manu Dibango, sports journalist Hakim Djelouat and presenter Aïssa Thiam.

Founded with joint French and Gabonese funds, the network split early on into two near identical structures, Africa nº 1 Gabon and Africa nº 1 Paris. From 2000, France lost control of the original Gabonese station, which fell under the control of the Libyan Arab Jamahiriya in 2007 and saw strong financial difficulties since then. On the other hand, Africa nº 1 Paris obtained good ratings and stabilized its presence in the French audiovisual landscape.

In 2019, the station changed its name to Africa Radio and became a part of Les Indés Radios, a grouping of French independent radio stations.

== History ==
=== Africa n° 1 Gabon ===
The station was born from the will of Gabonese president Omar Bongo who started erecting a broadcasting center at Moabi, operational in 1979. In 1981, the Gabonese state financed, in partnership with private investors and SOFIRAD (French company with public capital), the creation of Africa nº 1. In exchange for SOFIRAD's financial support, the Moyabi station started relaying Radio France Internationale's output. Over the years, the relays were amplified in the morning and at noon. To limit the usage of the frequencies, the Moyabi transmitter often used the same frequencies of the main RFI transmitter at Issoudun.

Africa nº 1 Gabon started broadcasting on 7 February 1981, after conducting a few weeks of test broadcasts between 17 September and 27 October 1979 to test the new facility. Soon, other players such as Radio Japan, Adventist World Radio and Swiss Radio International started using the station when Africa nº 1 was not broadcasting.

The appearance of the station led to a massive change to the African radio landscape, long dominated by dictators and ruling parties. Its programming included popular African music as well as in-depth reports, something state-owned radio stations could not air. Following the end of the Cold War and the instability across the African continent, Africa nº 1 started suffering the weight of competition from newcomers (mostly African independent media outlets) and long-established heavyweights such as the BBC World Service, Deutsche Welle and RFI, which already had services in Arabic, English, French, Portuguese and several African languages. By contrast, Africa nº 1 was repositioned as a pan-African station, broadcasting largely in French. By the early 2000s, following the creation of a relay station in Abidjan, the local authorities instructed the Gabonese station not to air news critical of the Ivoirien government. Further controversies included the airing of advertisements for cigarette brands such as Marlboro and Benson & Hedges (tobacco advertising was already banned in most countries of the world) and accusations of government interference in the DRC (as Zaire) and a mob attack at its headquarters in Libreville as the station had one-sided coverage of the situation in Gabon. In 1999, three journalists from the Republic of the Congo were fired for their reports on ethnic conflicts in the civil war.

After Sofirad's exit in 2002, the Libyan Jamahiriya Broadcasting Corporation recovered 52% of the company from the Gabonese state (35%) and a private Gabonese shareholder (13%) in 2007. The agreement between Libya and the Gabonese state projected that the latter could buy the passive shares while the former could engage in the expenses of modernizing its infrastructures.

A first strike erupted in August 2008: during the station's privatization plan, consequence of the acquisition by Libya, the funds used for licensing were fifteen times lower than the ones announced.

In 2009, the Ministry of Communications of Gabon announced the ctration of a television channel under the Africa nº 1 label.

In April 2010, Africa n° 1's management handed over from LJBC subsidiary Broadcasting to Libya African Portfolio (LAP), the media and publishing subsidiary of the Libyan holding. Louis Bartélémi Mapangou, historical owner of the station, was replaced by Lysiban Anber Elbashir Ali Abubaker.

In May 2011, Africa nº 1 ceased broadcasting to Africa. The cause was a pending debt worth FCFA 200 million (€300,000) it owed in satellite fees to Eutelsat whose main shareholder, LJBC, could not pay. The Gabonese state engaged its efforts to regularize the situation, and injecting FCFA 150 million each month in the company. During 2013, the station could no longer be heard from the Moyabi transmitter; a new strike then followed in December that year as the station's finances were deteriorating over time.

In February 2016, a new strike hit the African offices of the network, led by staff who protested the degradation of their working conditions and their minimum wages for four months. In May 2016, the staff voted for the end of the general strike and programs were resumed.

In November 2018, the National Agency for Digital Infrastructures and Frequencies (ANINF) removed the frequency which enabled it to broadcast, due to the deplorable state of the facilities and staff; a reaction from the Gabonese public powers was pending. Almost at the same time, it became known on 28 November 2018 that the company, under the new name Africa Radio, obtained an FM frequency in Brazzaville, after obtaining earlier that year during summer a new one in Abidjan.

In March 2024, the Minister of Communications of Gabon launched, officially, rehabilitation and cleaning work of Africa nº1's offices also marking its reopening.

=== Africa nº 1 Paris ===
In Paris, the station exists since 1992. Africa n°1-Paris is owned by Africa Média, 63% of which is owned by Partenaire Production (directed by Dominique Guihot, director-general of Africa Média), 17% by ANTC (Africa Nouvelles Technologies et Communication, a company where Dominique Guihot is the main shareholder) and 20% by Africa n°1-Gabon.

Thanks to a partnership with the BBC French for Africa service, Africa n°1 Paris airs four news bulletins a day live from Dakar. In January 2015, Africa n°1 Paris signed a partnership with Forbes to broadcast a weekly business program on its frequencies with Marc Jézégabel, editor-in-chief at Forbes Afrique.

In January 2016, the latest available figures from Médiamétrie denoted a daily cumulative audience of 111,000 listeners (40,000 more in a year) and an average listening time of one hour and a half per day.

=== Africa Radio ===
In April 2019, the station changed its name and became Africa Radio, becoming a member of Les Indés Radios.

== Team ==
As of late July 2019, the station had a team of thirteen journalists and presenters, among them Hakim Djelouat, Aïssa Thiam and Manu Dibango.

== Programming ==
On 14 January 2017, Africa N°1 covered the opening match of the 2017 Africa Cup of Nations live with sports journalists Hakim Djelouat, Lamine Badiane, Christian Shango and consultant Willy Dorkenoo, live from Libreville, in partnership with BBC Afrique. On 1 December that year, World AIDS Day was used for the station to issue a campaign for HIV testing.

== Availability ==
=== Worldwide ===
Africa Radio broadcasts online and on satellite around the world (through the Africa Sat satellite package).

Following the problems it faced in Africa and since its name change, Africa Radio has had a limited FM network. By late July 2019, the station issued a development policy for Francophone Africa from Abidjan and Brazzaville in FM, while also candidating for frequencies in Dakar, Ouagadougou, Douala and Yaoundé.

Also as of 2019, the president-director-general of Africa Radio announced that after Lille, Strasbourg, Lyon, Nantes, Rouen, Saint-Nazaire, Le Havre, Toulouse, Bordeaux and Orléans, the station followed its digital development on the DAB+ network in France, upon arriving to Marseille and Nice.

== See also ==
- Europe 1
- SOFIRAD
