= Jérémie Gustave Nzamba =

Gabonese journalist (1960–2026)

- Born: 1960; Gabon
- Died: 25 July 2026 (aged 66); Libreville, Gabon
- Other name: Djidjen
- Occupations: Journalist, teacher, trade unionist
- Employer: Africa Radio

Jérémie Gustave Nzamba (1960 – 25 July 2026), also known as Djidjen, was a Gabonese journalist, teacher and trade unionist. He worked at the Africa Radio for over 40 years. Nzamba was committed to defending the social rights of former Africa Radio employees.

== Early life and career ==
Jérémie Gustave Nzamba was born in Gabon in 1960. He worked for several years at Africa Radio, where he presented radio news programs and analyzed current events. He worked as an educator, teaching journalism and communication courses at universities in Gabon. Nzamba was awarded Gabonese Press Awards.

Nzamba began his activist career in defending the worker rights. He served as the vice president for the Syndicat des communicateurs d'Africa N°1. He appealed to the Gabonese authorities regarding the settlement of social rights of former employees of the radio station and the implementation of a social plan.

== Death ==
Nzamba died in Libreville on 25 July 2026, at the age of 66.
