= 2003 in Gabon =

- Decades: 1980s; 1990s; 2000s; 2010s; 2020s
- See also: Other events of 2003; Timeline of Gabonese history

Events in the year 2003 in Gabon.

== Incumbents ==
- President: Omar Bongo Ondimba
- Prime Minister: Jean-François Ntoutoume Emane

== Events ==
- The country competed in the 2003 All-Africa Games held at the National Stadium in the city of Abuja, Nigeria.
