= 2022 in Gabon =

- Decades: 2000s; 2010s; 2020s
- See also: Other events of 2022; Timeline of Gabonese history

Events in the year 2022 in Gabon.

== Incumbents ==
- President: Ali Bongo Ondimba
- Prime Minister: Rose Christiane Ossouka Raponda

== Events ==
Ongoing: COVID-19 pandemic in Gabon

- 25 June – Gabon and Togo officially become members of the Commonwealth of Nations.

== Deaths ==
- 5 May – Théodore Nzue Nguema, 48, football player.
