= SOFIRAD =

French company (1942–2017)

Société financière de radiodiffusion (lit. 'Broadcasting Funding Company', SOFIRAD) was a French-government-operated company that managed the state's participation in radio and television broadcasting. At closing time, it was valued at €26,892,007.

== History ==
Société financière de radiodiffusion was founded on 7 November 1942 under the name Société financière de radio (SOFIRA) (Radio Funding Company) to hold financial operations that were not possible for the state administration of national radio, especially concerning participation from private companies, eventually launching a "war of the waves". In 1943, the German-backed government created a radio station in Monaco, Radio Monte Carlo, with the aim of broadcasting propaganda towards southern France. The financial company grouped all French companies holding shares in the station.

After Liberation, on 13 November 1944, the administrative council changed; René Hoffherr became its president and its headquarters transferred from Cusset (Allier) to Paris. On 17 June 1946, the administrative council decided to add a D (this becoming SOFIRAD) to avoid confusions with another company also named Sofira. This holding allowed the French government to take part in the shares, and financial control, of the main peripheral stations in small countries along the French border: RMC from Monaco (in 1944), Europe 1 from the Saar Protectorate (in 1954), Sud Radio from Andorra (since 1961). Only Radio Andorra and RTL in Luxembourg remained outside its control. In 1968, SOFIRAD launched Monte Carlo Doualiya, an Arabic subsidiary of RMC, its first station.

In the late 1970s, SOFIRAD and Gaumont took control of Telefrance USA, a French-language television station in New York City that was available on cable networks there. After injections of capital, Gaumont faced financial issues and the channel was put into liquidation. In 1981, SOFIRAD tried a partnership in Brazil, by signing a contract to sell equipment without Coface's warranty to the television network Rede Bandeirantes. The revenues gained from the airing of dubbed French films, sold by Sofirad do Brasil, reduced potential economic failures. In practice, SOFIRAD acquired a number of rights for films and their dubbing that were not released. The ratings of the first titles were seen as a deception and the revenues could not afford further rights. The company was liquidated and SOFIRAD agreed to a partial remittance agreement for the debt in exchange for payment over the years.

In 1981, SOFIRAD launched Africa No. 1 in association with the Gabonese president Omar Bongo, catering to the Françafrique.

Through a subsidiary company owned by RMC, but entirely managed by SOFIRAD, SOFIRAD started producing feature films and animated series. Following an agreement with Parafrance, it co-produced the film Les Uns et les Autres, and co-distributed twelve others, such as Rue Barbare and La Passante du Sans Souci. Independently, it produced animated series through its France Animation subsidiary (Les Mondes Engloutis, Tarzan, etc.). Initially named RMC Audiovisuel, SOFIRAD left the company in 1987 and planned to selling the Saint Lucian radio station Radio Caribbean International. It then left Europe 1 (in exchange for the building of a legal FM network) and Sud Radio in 1986, and from RMC later on, in 1998.

The dissolution of the company in 1999 following the sale of RMC was a lengthy process. The company was finally dissolved on 1 August 2017.

SOFIRAD's archives are preserved and searchable on the National Archives of France.
