= 1992 in Gabon =

- Decades: 1970s; 1980s; 1990s; 2000s; 2010s
- See also: Other events of 1992; Timeline of Gabonese history

Events in the year 1992 in Gabon.

== Incumbents ==
- President: Omar Bongo Ondimba
- Prime Minister: Casimir Oyé-Mba

== Events ==
- The country competed at the 1992 Summer Olympics in Barcelona, Spain.
- The African Forum for Reconstruction was founded.

== Births ==
- 10 October: Pierre Atcho, FIFA football referee
