= 2010 in Gabon =

- Decades: 1990s; 2000s; 2010s; 2020s
- See also: Other events of 2010; Timeline of Gabonese history

Events in the year 2010 in Gabon.

== Incumbents ==
- President: Ali Bongo Ondimba
- Prime Minister: Paul Biyoghé Mba

== Events ==
- 10 February – The National Union was formed.
