= 2019 in Gabon =

- Decades: 1990s; 2000s; 2010s; 2020s
- See also: Other events of 2019; Timeline of Gabonese history

Events in the year 2019 in Gabon.

== Incumbents ==
- President: Ali Bongo Ondimba
- Prime Minister: Emmanuel Issoze-Ngondet (until 12 January), Julien Nkoghe Bekale (from 12 January)

== Events ==
- 7 January – Members of the Armed Forces of Gabon announced a coup d'état against President Ali Bongo.
