= Swiss Radio International =

Defunct radio station

- Switzerland
- Broadcast area: Switzerland
- Frequencies: Shortwave, Satellite, IPTV, Streaming

Ownership
- Owner: SRG SSR

History
- First air date: 1 August 1935; 91 years ago
- Last air date: 20 October 2004

Swiss Radio International (SRI, German: Schweizer Radio International, French: Radio Suisse Internationale, Italian: Radio Svizzera Internazionale), known until 1978 as Swiss Shortwave Service, was the international radio station of Switzerland. It was part of the SRG SSR. It was closed in 2004.

The SRI interval signal consists of the opening lines of the volkslied Lueget, vo Berg und Tal.
