= 2014 in Gabon =

- Decades: 1990s; 2000s; 2010s; 2020s
- See also: Other events of 2014; Timeline of Gabonese history

Events in the year 2014 in Gabon.

== Incumbents ==
- President: Ali Bongo Ondimba
- Prime Minister: Raymond Ndong Sima (until 27 January), Daniel Ona Ondo (from 27 January)

== Events ==
- 16–28 August – The country competed at the 2014 Summer Youth Olympics, in Nanjing, China.
