= 2008 in Gabon =

- Decades: 1980s; 1990s; 2000s; 2010s; 2020s
- See also: Other events of 2008; Timeline of Gabonese history

Events in the year 2008 in Gabon.

== Incumbents ==
- President: Omar Bongo Ondimba
- Prime Minister: Jean Eyeghé Ndong

== Events ==
- April 27 – 30 – Local elections were held in the country.
