= 1991 in Gabon =

- Decades: 1970s; 1980s; 1990s; 2000s; 2010s
- See also: Other events of 1991; Timeline of Gabonese history

Events in the year 1991 in Gabon.

== Incumbents ==
- President: Omar Bongo Ondimba
- Prime Minister: Casimir Oyé-Mba

== Events ==
- The country switches to multiparty elections following the adoption of a new constitution by the parliament.
