= 2013 in Gabon =

- Decades: 1990s; 2000s; 2010s; 2020s
- See also: Other events of 2013; Timeline of Gabonese history

Events in the year 2013 in Gabon.

== Incumbents ==
- President: Ali Bongo Ondimba
- Prime Minister: Raymond Ndong Sima

== Events ==
- 3 November – A total solar eclipse was visible in the country.
