= 2012 in Gabon =

- Decades: 1990s; 2000s; 2010s; 2020s
- See also: Other events of 2012; Timeline of Gabonese history

Events in the year 2012 in Gabon.

== Incumbents ==
- President: Ali Bongo Ondimba
- Prime Minister: Paul Biyoghé Mba (until 27 February), Raymond Ndong Sima (from 27 February)

== Events ==
- 12 February – The 2012 Africa Cup of Nations final was played at the Stade d'Angondjé in Libreville.
