= 2016 in Gabon =

- Decades: 1990s; 2000s; 2010s; 2020s
- See also: Other events of 2016; Timeline of Gabonese history

The following lists events the happened during 2016 in Gabon.

== Incumbents ==
- President: Ali Bongo Ondimba
- Prime Minister: Daniel Ona Ondo (until September 28), Emmanuel Issoze-Ngondet (from September 28)

== Events ==
=== August ===
- August 28 - Both President Bongo and Jean Ping claim victory in yesterday's presidential election.
- August 31 - After Ali Bongo is declared President, violence breaks out with Ping supporters as protesters set fire to the parliament building.

=== September ===
- September 1 - Large explosions and gunfire are heard around the capital of Libreville as security forces clash with demonstrators and the military bombs the building of Jean Ping's party, killing 2. The internet is also cut off in the capital.
- September 7 - President Bongo rejects calls for a recount in the disputed election.

== Links ==
Media related to 2016 in Gabon at Wikimedia Commons
