= 2021 in Gabon =

- Decades: 2000s; 2010s; 2020s
- See also: Other events of 2021; Timeline of Gabonese history

Events in the year 2021 in Gabon.

== Incumbents ==
- President: Ali Bongo Ondimba
- Prime Minister: Rose Christiane Ossouka Raponda

== Events ==
- 13 March – The country's COVID-19 vaccination program began after 100,000 doses of the Sinopharm BIBP vaccine was donated by China.
- 11 June – During the 2021 United Nations Security Council Elections, Gabon was elected to serve a two-year term as a non-permanent member of the UN Security Council, beginning in 2022. It will mark the fourth time Gabon has sat on the Security Council.
