= François Engongah Owono =

Gabonese politician (1945–2023)

François Engongah Owono (17 July 1945 – 25 February 2023) was a Gabonese politician. He was long identified with the reformist faction of the Gabonese Democratic Party (PDG) during the rule of President Omar Bongo, holding various important posts. After serving in the government of Gabon as Minister of National Education from 2004 to 2006, he was President of the National Council of Communication from 2006 to 2009 and then Minister of State for Labor in 2009. Under Bongo's son and successor, Ali Bongo, Engongah Owono held the key post of Secretary-General of the Presidency from October 2009 to January 2011.

== Political career ==
A member of the Fang ethnic group, Engongah Owono was born at Oyem in 1945. An influential member of the PDG's reformist faction (rénovateurs), he was Secretary of State under the Minister of Regional Development Planning from May 1990 to November 1990, then Secretary of State under the Minister of Equipment and Construction from November 1990 to July 1991. He was appointed an Adviser at the Presidency in 1991.

In 1995, Engongah Owono was designated as National Secretary of the PDG for Litigation, Enforcement of Discipline, and Elections. In the December 2001 parliamentary election, he was elected to the National Assembly as a PDG candidate in Oyem, receiving 50.21% of the vote. A year later, he was appointed to the government as Minister-Delegate under the Minister of State for Agriculture on 12 November 2002, and he took office on 18 November. In the December 2002 local elections, he led one of the PDG's two lists in Oyem.

Engongah Owono was promoted to the post of Minister of National Education on 5 September 2004. At the time of the November 2005 presidential election, he was President Omar Bongo's campaign coordinator in Oyem. He remained Minister of National Education until Bongo appointed him as President of the National Council of Communication on 19 January 2006. After three years in the latter post, he was instead appointed Minister of State for Labor and Employment on 14 January 2009.

Engongah Owono was one of Ali Bongo's key allies over the years, and after Omar Bongo died in June 2009, Ali was nominated as the PDG's presidential candidate. At the time of the August 2009 presidential election, Engongah Owono was Ali Bongo's campaign coordinator in Woleu-Ntem Province. On 16 October 2009, when Bongo took office as President, he immediately moved Engongah Owono from his post as Minister of State for Labor to that of Secretary-General of the Presidency. As Secretary-General of the Presidency, Engongah Owono held a position of crucial importance, and some suspected that he would wield powers akin to those of a prime minister.

On 17 October 2009, Engongah Owono announced the composition of the first government to be appointed by Bongo. He said that the reduction of the number of ministers—from 44 to 29—had been done in an efficient manner and that the new government's "main mission" would be "putting the country back to work".

Engongah Owono served as Secretary-General of the Presidency for a little over a year; President Bongo appointed Laure Olga Gondjout to replace him on 14 January 2011. His dismissal was linked to his age, as he was past the official age limit for his position, and apparently marked the end of his political career.

Owono died in Paris on 26 February 2023, at age 77.
