= 1990 in Gabon =

- Decades: 1970s; 1980s; 1990s; 2000s; 2010s
- See also: Other events of 1990; Timeline of Gabonese history

Events in the year 1990 in Gabon.

== Incumbents ==
- President: Omar Bongo Ondimba
- Prime Minister: Léon Mébiame (until 3 May), Casimir Oyé-Mba (from 3 May)

== Events ==
- Opposition parties are made legal.
