= 1993 in Gabon =

- Decades: 1970s; 1980s; 1990s; 2000s; 2010s
- See also: Other events of 1993; Timeline of Gabonese history

Events in the year 1993 in Gabon.

== Incumbents ==
- President: Omar Bongo Ondimba
- Prime Minister: Casimir Oyé-Mba

== Events ==
- 5 December – Omar Bongo wins the country's presidential election.
