= 2011 in Gabon =

- Decades: 1990s; 2000s; 2010s; 2020s
- See also: Other events of 2011; Timeline of Gabonese history

The following lists events the happened during 2011 in Gabon.

== Incumbents ==
- President: Ali Bongo Ondimba
- Prime Minister: Paul Biyoghé Mba

== Events ==
=== January ===
- January 26 - The government dissolves the main opposition party accusing one of its leaders of committing treason.
- January 28 - Police fire tear gas on anti-government demonstrators two days after opposition leader André Mba Obame declares him president.
