= Jean de Dieu Moukagni Iwangou =

Gabonese politician (1959/1960–2025)

Jean de Dieu Moukagni Iwangou (1959 or 1960 – 1 November 2025) was a Gabonese politician and magistrate.

== Life and career ==
Moukagni Iwangou was born about 1960. He was President of the Gabonese People’s Union during the 2016 elections.

Moukagni Iwangou died on 1 November 2025, at the age of 65.
