= 2025 in Gabon =

- Decades: 2000s; 2010s; 2020s
- See also: Other events of 2025; Timeline of Gabonese history

Events in the year 2025 in Gabon.

== Incumbents ==
- President: Brice Clotaire Oligui Nguema
- Prime Minister: Raymond Ndong Sima

== Events ==
=== January ===
- 20 January – The Transitional Parliament approves a new electoral code.

=== April ===
- 12 April – 2025 Gabonese presidential election: Acting president Brice Oligui Nguema is elected as regular president with 90.35% of the vote.

=== May ===
- 3 May – Brice Oligui Nguema is inaugurated for a regular term as president.
- 16 May – Former president Ali Bongo and his family are confirmed to have been released and in Angola following an agreement between Angolan President João Lourenço and President Oligui.
- 19 May – The International Court of Justice rules in favor of Equatorial Guinea's claims to the islands of Mbanie, Cocotier, and Conga, which have been occupied by Gabon since 1972.
- 27 May – Trade unionist Patrick Barbera Isaac is appointed Minister of Labour, Full Employment and Social Dialogue.

=== June ===
- 6 June – Gabon announces its withdrawal from a 2007 agreement with the European Union that allowed EU vessels to fish in Gabonese waters in exchange for financial support to Gabon’s fisheries sector.

=== August ===
- 12 August – The government issues an amnesty for participants in the 2023 Gabonese coup d'état and the 2019 Gabonese coup attempt.

=== September ===
- 27 September – 2025 Gabonese parliamentary election (first round)

=== October ===
- 11 October – 2025 Gabonese parliamentary election (second round)
- 18 October – 2025 Gabonese parliamentary election (partial rerun)

=== November ===
- 11 November – A special criminal court in Libreville convicts former first lady Sylvia Bongo Ondimba and her son Noureddin Bongo Valentin on multiple criminal charges and sentences them to 20 years' imprisonment.
- 18 November –
  - Gabon signs the "Gabon Infini" climate finance agreement, combining $94 million in donor funding with $86 million of government money over 10 years to protect 34,000 km^{2} (13,000 sq mi) of the Congo Basin rainforest.
  - The Specialized Criminal Court convicts nine associates of Sylvia and Noureddin Bongo of embezzlement, corruption, and money laundering and sentences them to up to 15 years' imprisonment.

=== December ===
- 3 December – Tourism minister Pascal Ogowé Siffon is placed under house arrest on suspicion of embezzling nearly $18 million of the ministry's funds.
- 16 December – US President Donald Trump issues a proclamation imposing partial travel restrictions on Gabonese nationals travelling to the United States.

== Holidays ==
- 1 January – New Year's Day
- 30 March – Eid al-Fitr
- 17 April – Women's Day
- 21 April – Easter Monday
- 1 May – Labour Day
- 29 May – Ascension Day
- 6 June – Eid al-Adha
- 9 June Whit Monday
- 15 August – Assumption Day
- 16–17 August – Independence Day
- 1 November – All Saints Day
- 25 December – Christmas Day

== Deaths ==
- 16 April – Aaron Boupendza, 28, footballer (national team).
- 1 November – Jean de Dieu Moukagni Iwangou, 65, politician and magistrate.
