= 2015 in Gabon =

- Decades: 1990s; 2000s; 2010s; 2020s
- See also: Other events of 2015; Timeline of Gabonese history

Events in the year 2015 in Gabon.

== Incumbents ==
- President: Ali Bongo Ondimba
- Prime Minister: Daniel Ona Ondo

== Events ==
- 6 & 27 October – Legislative elections were held in the country, alongside municipal elections.
