= 2017 in Gabon =

- Decades: 1990s; 2000s; 2010s; 2020s
- See also: Other events of 2017; Timeline of Gabonese history

Events in the year 2017 in Gabon.

== Incumbents ==
- President: Ali Bongo Ondimba
- Prime Minister: Emmanuel Issoze-Ngondet

== Events ==
- 14 January-5 February – Gabon hosted the 2017 Africa Cup of Nations.
- 29 July – scheduled date for the Gabonese legislative election, 2017

== Deaths ==
- 26 April – Moïse Brou Apanga, footballer (b. 1982)
