= Gabon of the Future =

Political party in Gabon

The Gabon of the Future (French: Gabon Avenir) is a political party in Gabon led by Sylvestre Oyouomi.

== History ==
Established by Oyouomi in 1999, the party won one seat in the Senate in the 2003 elections, but lost it in the 2009 elections.

In 2010 the party joined the Republican Majority for Emergence, a bloc supporting the Gabonese Democratic Party.
