= 2018 in Gabon =

- Decades: 1990s; 2000s; 2010s; 2020s
- See also: Other events of 2018; Timeline of Gabonese history

The following lists events in the year 2018 in Gabon.

== Incumbents ==
- President: Ali Bongo Ondimba
- Prime Minister: Emmanuel Issoze-Ngondet

== Events ==
=== October ===
- October 6 - Gabonese people vote in a legislative election, the first election since the controversial presidential election in 2016.

== Deaths ==
- 1 January – Régis Manon, footballer (b. 1965).
- 26 March – Jules-Aristide Bourdes-Ogouliguende, politician (b. 1938).
