= European Globalisation Adjustment Fund for Displaced Workers =

The European Globalisation Adjustment Fund for Displaced Workers (EGF) was set up by the European Union in late 2006 to support to workers (not companies or institutions) who have been made redundant as a result of trade liberalisation, so that they can either remain in employment or find a new job quickly. It provides counselling; job search and mobility allowances; new ICT skills and other forms of training; entrepreneurial support, including micro-credits.

Since 2007 EGF has received more than 100 applications from 20 EU member states for programs that would support more than 100,000 workers who either lost their jobs due to globalization (56%) or as a result of the 2008 financial crisis (44%). The hardest-hit industries were in automobile manufacturing (22.5%), machinery and equipment (13.5%), textile and apparel (12%), computers, mobile phones and ICT (11.6%) and construction (9.6%).

== Conditions for assistance ==
The Fund is activated upon request of a member state when a company (whether national, multinational or SMEs) lays off more than 1,000 people either in an enterprise, or in a sector within a region, due to structural changes in world trade. The Fund seeks to intervene when redundancies have a significant impact on a region or a sector and therefore there is an EU dimension in terms of scale and impact.

The EGF is open to all persons who work legally in the EU. It operates under the principle of subsidiarity, and in a system of shared management between the European Commission and the member state. Responsibility for implementing the EGF lies with the authorities of the member states. The maximum amount available through the EGF is €500 million per year for the period of 2007 to 2013.

== Activities ==
Since 1 January 2007, the EGF has been funding active labour market policies helping workers made redundant as a result of globalisation, for example through:

- Job-search assistance, occupational guidance, tailor-made training and retraining including IT skills and certification of acquired experience, outplacement assistance and entrepreneurship promotion or aid for self-employment,
- Special time-limited measures, such as job-search allowances, allowances to individuals participating in lifelong learning and training activities,
- Measures to stimulate in particular disadvantaged or older workers, to remain in or return to employment.

It complements support provided by the employers and national authorities concerned in terms of active labour market policy measures; it does not fund passive social protection measures such as retirement pensions or unemployment benefits. Member states can also use EGF money to publicize activities highlighting the EGF's role in their support for workers.

== Relationship to other funds ==
The EU Structural Funds, in particular the European Social Fund (ESF), consist of multi-annual programmes in support of strategic, long-term goals, and management of change and restructuring in the 2007–2013 period, with activities such as lifelong learning. The EGF is a response to a specific, European-scale crisis; it provides one-off, time-limited individual support geared directly to helping workers who have become redundant for reasons related to international trade.

== Global economic crisis ==
The European Commission proposed that, in addition to its current scope, the Fund should be able to support workers made redundant as a result of the global financial and economic crisis on 16 December 2008. In addition, it proposes to reduce the threshold of redundancies from the current 1,000 to 500, to extend the period of each case from 12 to 24 months, and to increase its contribution from 50% of total cost to 75% (the rest being contributed by the member state). This proposal was submitted to the Council and the European Parliament in December 2008. It is expected that the amendment will be adopted in mid-2009. There is a need of this fund because the difference in labour costs at the international level remains an important determinant of the geographical distribution of production, because the large apparel companies are constantly seeking production bases lower labour costs. Additionally, the ongoing globalisation of trade has intensified this situation. The search for lower labour costs have led to significant changes in the image of global apparel industry. The production of clothing gradually moved from Europe to Asia, which now accounts for nearly 45% of global garment production.

== See also ==
- European Commissioner for Employment, Social Affairs & Equal Opportunities
- Directorate-General for Employment, Social Affairs and Equal Opportunities (European Commission)
- European Social Fund
- Trade Adjustment Assistance, a similar program in the United States
