= 2009 in Gabon =

- Decades: 1980s; 1990s; 2000s; 2010s; 2020s
- See also: Other events of 2009; Timeline of Gabonese history

Events in the year 2009 in Gabon.

== Incumbents ==
- President: Omar Bongo Ondimba (until 8 June), Didjob Divungi Di Ndinge (from 6 May until 10 June), Rose Francine Rogombé (from 10 June until 16 October), Ali Bongo Ondimba (from 16 October)
- Prime Minister: Jean Eyeghé Ndong (until 17 July), Paul Biyoghé Mba (from 17 July)

== Events ==
- June 8 – The second President of Gabon, Omar Bongo, died in Spain after having suffered from colorectal cancer.

== Deaths ==
- June 8 – Omar Bongo, 2nd President of Gabon (b. 1935)
