= Radio Caribbean International =

Radio station in St. Lucia

Coordinates: 14°01′01.3″N 60°59′22.7″W

- Castries; Saint Lucia
- Frequency: 101.1 MHz

History
- First air date: 1961

Radio Caribbean International (RCI) is a radio station based in Castries, Saint Lucia.

== History ==
One of the oldest radio services in the Eastern Caribbean, RCI was established in 1961 and was one of the country's two stations (along with Radio St. Lucia) during its early years. It was a former division of French-based SOFIRAD and a part of Radio Caraïbes International in Martinique/Guadeloupe. By November 1998, SOFIRAD proposed to sell the station to its staff; in February 1999, ownership was transferred to its longest-serving personnel, Peter Effraime and Pet Gibson. Eventually, eleven other employees filed a lawsuit against Effraime and Gibson for "breach of trust and misrepresentation". RCI was faced with closure and a possible sale in June 2004 (after several years of losses), but has remained on air as of 2022.

== Programming ==
Aside from programs in English, RCI also broadcast French-language content from its launch until 1995. Creole-language programming was introduced in 1974 with the one-hour evening show Radio-a Sa-Sé Nou (It's Our Radio).

== Coverage ==
In addition to its native St. Lucia, RCI serves listeners in Martinique and Dominica.
