= Sylvestre Oyouomi =

Gabonese politician

Sylvestre Oyouomi (born 4 August 1942) is a Gabonese politician. He was a minister in the government from 1981 to 1990 and was Gabon's Ambassador to France from 1991 to 1993. Since 1999, he has led Gabon of the Future (Gabon Avenir), a political party.

Oyouomi was born in Omoi, near Franceville in southeastern Gabon, and he taught mathematics for a time. He was Deputy Director-General of the Gabonese Social Insurance Fund (CGPS) from 1973 until 1975, when the CGPS was renamed as the National Social Security Fund (CNSS); Oyouomi was then appointed as Director-General of the CNSS, succeeding Jean Ndende. He was Director-General of the CNSS until 1980 and then held the post of Ministerial Delegate at the Presidency of the Republic from February 1980 to August 1981; he was also President of the Gabonese Company of Production, Animal Husbandry, and Subsistence Products for a time.

He entered the government as Minister of Social Security and Welfare in August 1981 and remained in that post until September 1989, when he was instead appointed as Minister of Justice. He served only briefly in the latter position, as he was dismissed from the government in April 1990. Subsequently, he was appointed as Ambassador to France in early 1991, remaining in that post until 1993; Honorine Dossou Naki succeeded him as ambassador in 1994.

Oyouomi founded the political party Gabon of the Future in August 1999; its opening conference, which was addressed by Oyouomi, was held in Libreville on 14 August 1999. Oyouomi was again Director-General of the CNSS from 1999 to 2004. On 3 March 2006, he was appointed as Commissioner-General for Sanitary and Social Action under the Prime Minister.
