= 2024 in Gabon =

- Decades: 2000s; 2010s; 2020s
- See also: Other events of 2024; Timeline of Gabonese history

Events in the year 2024 in Gabon.

== Incumbents ==
- President: Brice Clotaire Oligui Nguema
- Prime Minister: Raymond Ndong Sima

== Events ==
- 2 April – A national dialogue is opened in Libreville as part of efforts to implement a transition to civilian government.
- 2 April – A draft constitution is presented to president Brice Oligui Nguema.
- 23 August – Gabon reports its first case of mpox in a patient who had visited Uganda.
- 30 September – The International Court of Justice begins hearings on a territorial dispute between Gabon and Equatorial Guinea over the ownership of the islands of Mbanie, Cocotier, and Conga, which have been occupied by Gabon since 1972.
- 16 November – 2024 Gabon constitutional referendum: An initiative to adopt a new constitution passes with more than 91% of voters in favour.

== Holidays ==
- 1 January – New Year's Day
- 1 April – Easter Monday
- 10 April – Eid al-Fitr
- 17 April – Women's Day
- 1 May – Labour Day
- 9 May - Ascension Day
- 20 May - Whit Monday
- 17 June – Eid al-Adha
- 15 August - Assumption Day
- 16–17 August – Independence Day
- 30 August - Liberation Day
- 1 November – All Saints' Day
- 25 December – Christmas Day
