= E.G.F. =

EGF (Entreprise Générale de Franceville)
- Industry: Civil Engineering
- Founded: September 20, 2000
- Founder: SENET Benoist
- Headquarters: Quartier Rénovation; Libreville; Gabon
- Area served: Gabon
- Key people: SENET Benoist, CEO
- Website: www.egf-gabon.com

E.G.F. (Entreprise Générale de Franceville) is a Gabonese company specialized in Civil Engineering, construction and special works in hard places.

== History of E.G.F. ==
EGF was founded in Franceville by Benoist SENET in 2000. The company started in a bad economical period due to the area seeing a decline in investments and big projects. Businesses refocused on Gabon's coast, especially in Port Gentil and Libreville, and EGF naturally moved to Libreville.

From then, the company developed quickly because it worked with two dynamic branches of industry: telecom and energy.

The growth of oil's cost in the second part of the 2000s triggered oil companies to reinvest in old oil fields. Maurel et Prom, a French junior oil company, which developed in Gabon began to work with E.G.F.

== E.G.F.'s Services and Activities ==
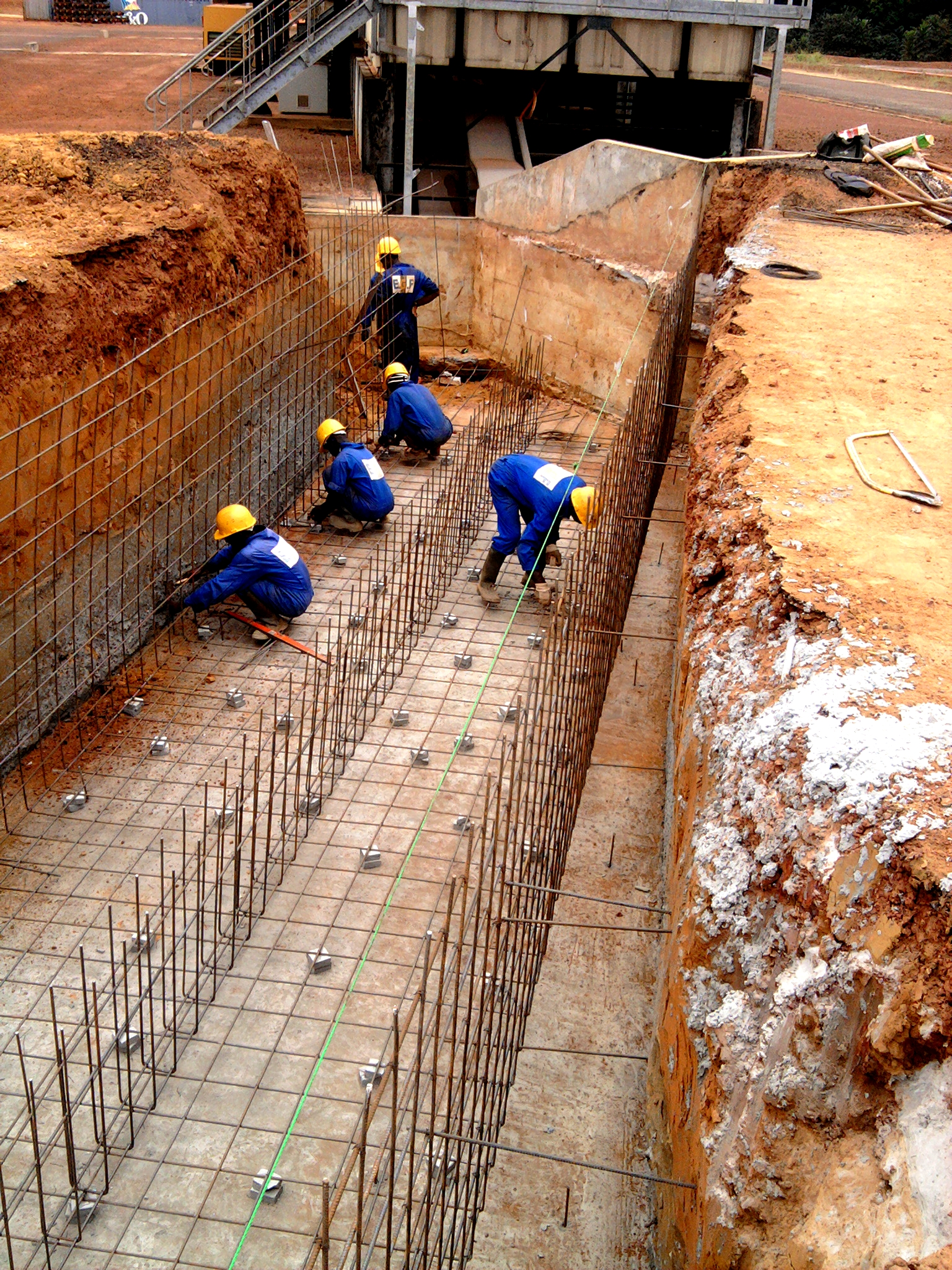
Building of gas pipe's gutter on Onal's oil field, Gabon

E.G.F.'s areas of focus are civil engineering, construction and special works. E.G.F. designs and builds structures like helipads, camps, warehouses, landing stages, schools, gas pipe gutters, wellhead's cellars, etc.

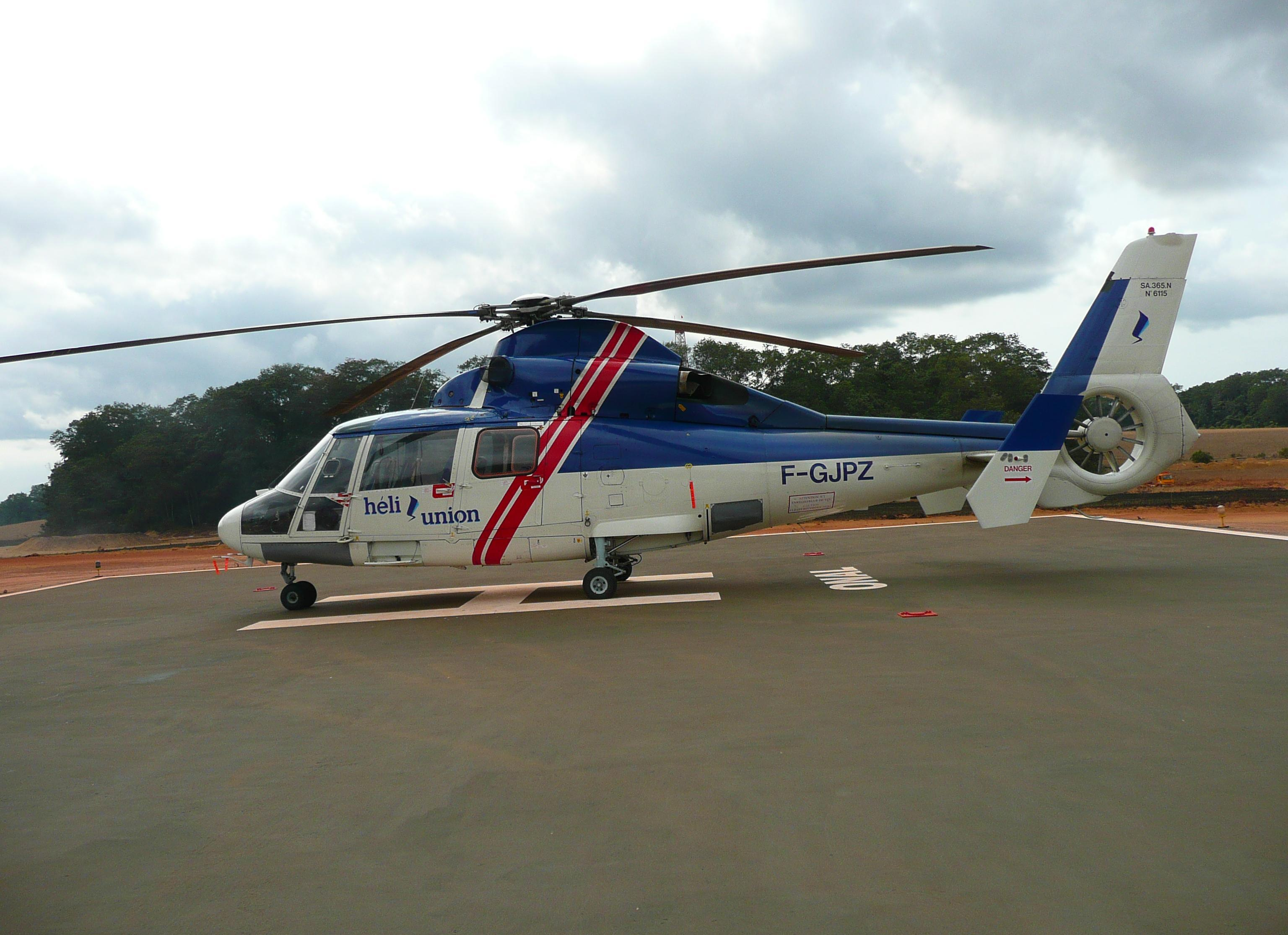
Helipad

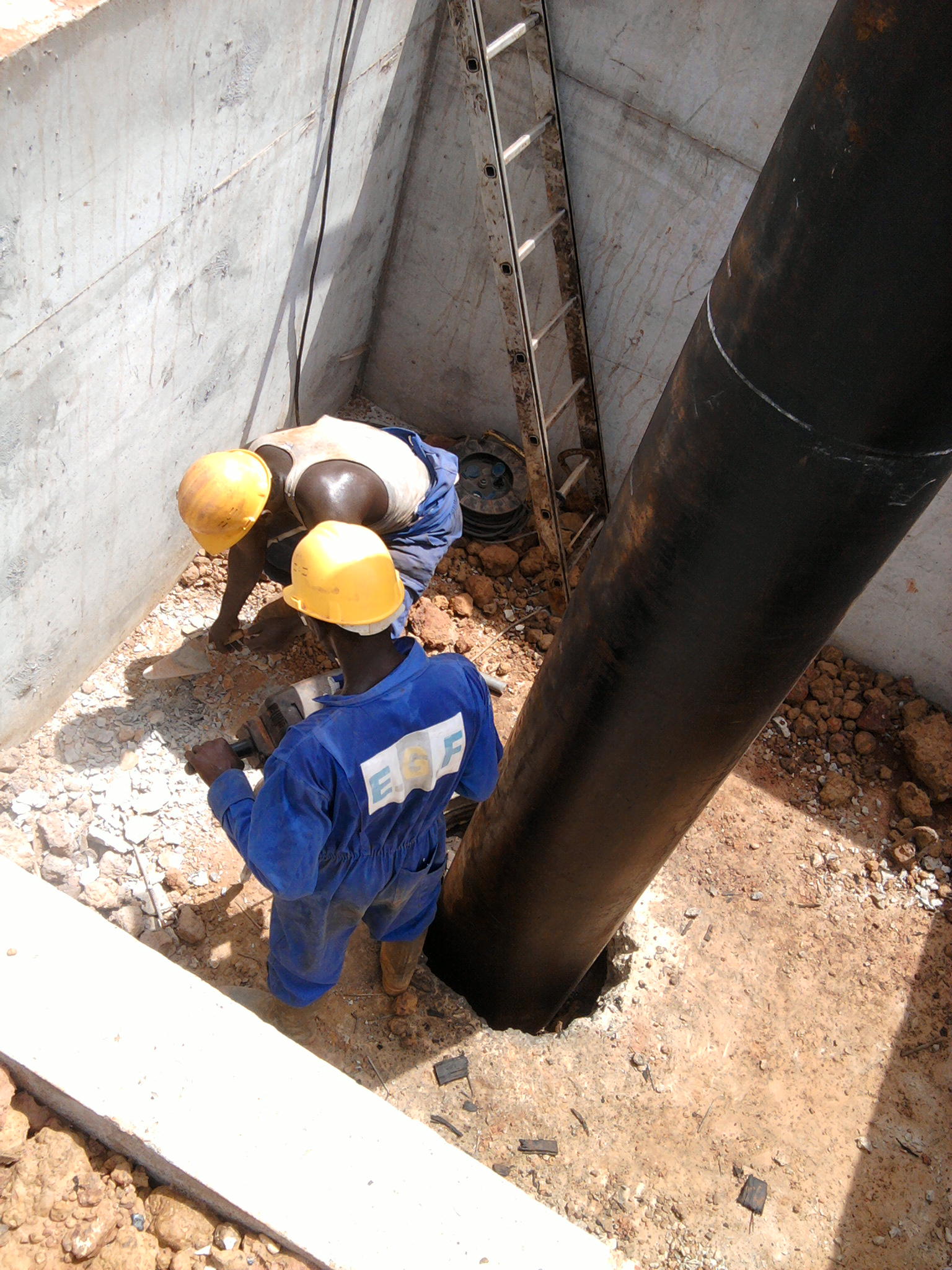
Wellhead's cellar

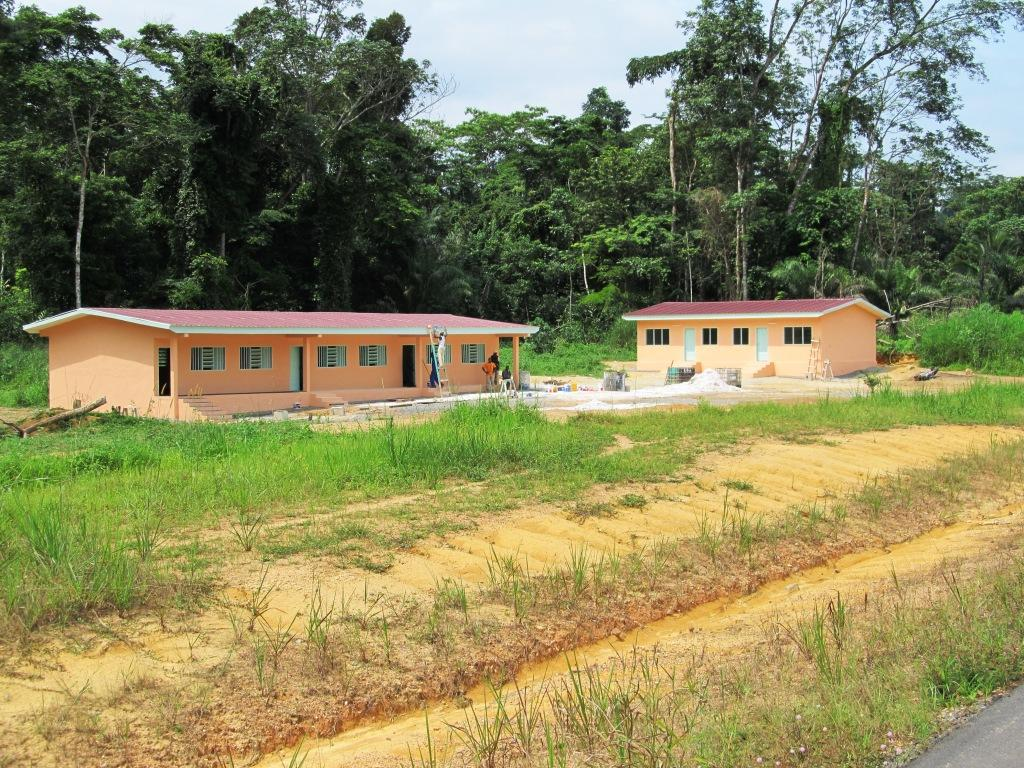
School
