= COVID-19 pandemic in Gabon =

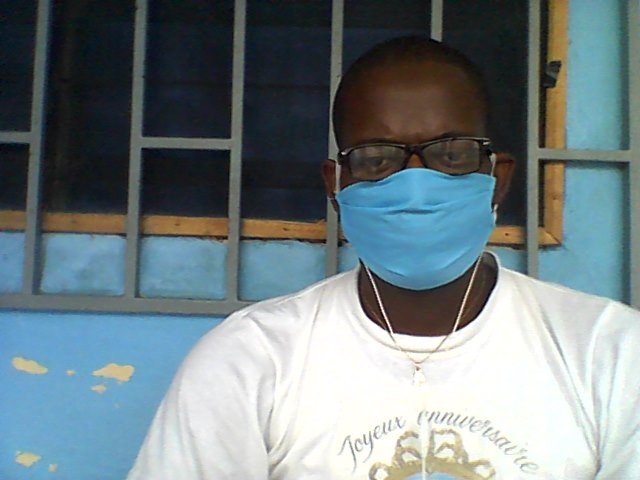
- Pandemic measures in Gabon during the pandemic
- Disease: COVID-19
- Pathogen: SARS-CoV-2
- Location: Gabon
- First outbreak: Wuhan, China
- Arrival date: 12 March 2020 (6 years, 5 months, 1 week and 3 days)
- Confirmed cases: 49,069 (updated 5 August 2026)
- Deaths: 307 (updated 5 August 2026)

The COVID-19 pandemic in Gabon was a part of the worldwide pandemic of coronavirus disease 2019 (COVID-19) caused by severe acute respiratory syndrome coronavirus 2 (SARS-CoV-2). The virus was confirmed to have reached Gabon in March 2020.

== Background ==
On 12 January 2020, the World Health Organization (WHO) confirmed that a novel coronavirus was the cause of a respiratory illness in a cluster of people in Wuhan City, Hubei Province, China, which was reported to the WHO on 31 December 2019.

The case fatality ratio for COVID-19 has been much lower than SARS of 2003, but the transmission has been significantly greater, with a significant total death toll.

== Timeline ==
=== March 2020 ===
- The country's first case was announced on 12 March, a 27-year-old Gabonese man who returned to Gabon from France, four days prior to confirmation of the coronavirus.
- On 17 March, two additional cases were confirmed in the country, including a woman who works at the Ministry of Foreign Affairs. She visited Marseille and Paris before returning to the country.
- On 20 March, the first death was confirmed.
- On 24 March, diagnosed cases increased to six with the Ministry of Health announcing two new cases: a 45-year-old Togolese national and resident of Gabon who recently returned from Senegal on 11 March, and a 42-year-old Gabonese national who returned from France on 19 March.
- During the month there were 7 confirmed cases, one death and six active cases at the end of the month.

=== Subsequent cases ===
- 2020 cases

There were 9,571 confirmed cases in 2020. 9,388 patients recovered while 64 persons died. At the end of 2020 there were 119 active cases.

- 2021 cases

Vaccination began on 23 March, initially with 100,000 doses of the Sinopharm BIBP vaccine donated by China.

There were 32,227 confirmed cases in 2021, bringing the total number of cases to 41,798. 28,111 patients recovered in 2021 while 224 persons died, bringing the total death toll to 288. At the end of 2021 there were 4,011 active cases.

Modelling by WHO's Regional Office for Africa suggests that due to under-reporting, the true cumulative number of infections by the end of 2021 was around one million while the true number of COVID-19 deaths was around 323.

- 2022 cases

There were 7,182 confirmed cases in 2022, bringing the total number of cases to 48,980. 11,169 patients recovered in 2022 while 18 persons died, bringing the total death toll to 306. At the end of 2022 there were six active cases.

- 2023 cases

There were 71 confirmed cases in 2023, bringing the total number of cases to 49,051. The total death toll rose to 307.

- 2024 cases

There were 5 confirmed cases in 2024, bringing the total number of cases to 49,056. The total death toll rose to 307.

== Statistics ==
Confirmed new cases per day

Confirmed deaths per day

== See also ==
- COVID-19 pandemic in Africa
- COVID-19 pandemic by country and territory
