= Paulin Obame-Nguema =

Gabonese politician (1934–2023)

4th Prime Minister of Gabon
- In office 2 November 1994 – 23 January 1999
- President: Omar Bongo
- Preceded by: Casimir Oyé-Mba
- Succeeded by: Jean-François Ntoutoume Emane

Personal details
- Born: 28 December 1934 Libreville, French Equatorial Africa (present day Gabon)
- Died: 11 December 2023 (aged 88) Libreville, Gabon

Paulin Obame-Nguema (28 December 1934 – 11 December 2023) was a Gabonese politician who was the Prime Minister of Gabon from 2 November 1994 to 23 January 1999. He was a Deputy in the National Assembly of Gabon.

== Prime Minister (1994–1999) ==
Obame-Nguema was born in Libreville on 28 December 1934. Following 1994 negotiations between the government and the opposition, which resulted in the signing of the Paris Accords on 7 October 1994, President Omar Bongo appointed Obame-Nguema—a Fang and member of the Gabonese Democratic Party (PDG)—as Prime Minister. Although some members of the opposition were included in his government, the two key opposition leaders, Paul Mba Abessole and Pierre-Louis Agondjo-Okawe, refused to participate.

Obame-Nguema offered his resignation in June 1996, but he was retained in his post by President Bongo. In the December 1996 parliamentary election, he was elected to the National Assembly as a PDG candidate in Estuaire Province; following that election, Bongo reappointed him as prime minister on 27 January 1997, and a new government under Obame-Nguema was appointed on 28 January.

== Later political activities ==
Bongo appointed Jean-François Ntoutoume-Emane to replace Obame-Nguema as prime minister in January 1999. Obame-Nguema was then appointed Minister of State for Public Health, Population, and Social Affairs in late January 1999 before being moved to the post of Minister of Social Affairs on 10 February 1999. He was again elected to the National Assembly as a Deputy from Estuaire Province in the December 2001 parliamentary election.

In the December 2006 parliamentary election, Obame-Nguema was re-elected to the National Assembly as the PDG candidate in Kango constituency, located in the Komo Kango Department of Estuaire Province. Due to his status as the oldest Deputy in the National Assembly, Obame-Nguema presided over the first meeting of the new parliamentary term, at which the Bureau of the National Assembly was elected, in January 2007. Guy Nzouba-Ndama was re-elected as President of the National Assembly, but Obame-Nguema encountered resistance from opposition deputies regarding the method of election for the other members of the Bureau. The opposition deputies left the chamber and did not participate in those votes. Obame-Nguema then invited Nzouba-Ndama to take his seat as President of the National Assembly.

At the PDG's 9th Ordinary Congress in September 2008, Obame-Nguema was designated as President Bongo's Personal Representative.

== Death ==
Obame-Nguema died in Libreville, on 11 December 2023, at the age of 88.
