= Jean-François Ntoutoume Emane =

Gabonese politician

5th Prime Minister of Gabon
- In office 23 January 1999 – 20 January 2006
- President: Omar Bongo
- Preceded by: Paulin Obame-Nguema
- Succeeded by: Jean Eyeghé Ndong

Personal details
- Born: 6 October 1939 (age 87) French Equatorial Africa (present day Estuaire Province, Gabon)
- Party: Gabonese Democratic Party (PDG)

Jean-François Ntoutoume Emane (born 6 October 1939) is a Gabonese politician who was Prime Minister of Gabon from 23 January 1999 to 20 January 2006. He was Mayor of Libreville, the capital, from 2008 to 2014.

== Life and career ==
Ntoutoume Emane is a member of the Fang ethnic group from Estuaire Province. After working at the Ministry of Finance, Ntoutoume Emane was Personal Adviser to President Omar Bongo from 1976 to 1990. On 13 July 1977, he was appointed as Minister and Personal Adviser to the President, responsible for the coordination of the economic and financial affairs of the Presidency as well as civil and commercial aviation. He served as Minister of Civil and Commercial Aviation until 1984, then as Minister of Commerce and Consumer Affairs from 1984 to 1987. In 1990, he was elected to the National Assembly as a candidate of the Gabonese Democratic Party (PDG), defeating opposition leader Paul M'ba Abessole in the Libreville residential riding of Lalala. He was appointed to the government of Prime Minister Casimir Oyé-Mba on 25 March 1994 as Minister of State Control, Decentralization, Territorial Administration and Regional Integration, but he declined the position.

Ntoutoume Emane led negotiations with the opposition in 1994 that resulted in the Paris Accords. Standing as a PDG candidate in the fifth arrondissement of Libreville, he again defeated Mba Abessole in the December 1996 parliamentary election. He was appointed as Minister of State for the Land-Survey Register, Housing, Lodgings, Urban Affairs, and Spatial Planning in the government of Prime Minister Paulin Obame-Nguema on 28 January 1997. Although he had been passed over for the post of Prime Minister earlier in the 1990s, Ntoutoume Emane was appointed as prime minister in January 1999, after serving as the campaign manager for President Omar Bongo during his successful re-election campaign for the December 1998 presidential election. He won a seat from Libreville as a PDG candidate in the December 2001 parliamentary election. After seven years as prime minister, Ntoutoume Emane was replaced by Jean Eyeghe Ndong after Bongo was sworn in for another term in January 2006.

Ntoutoume Emane won a seat in the December 2006 parliamentary election, but on 31 March 2007 his victory was annulled by the Constitutional Court due to irregularities. New elections for his seat and others with invalidated results were planned, but Ntoutoume Emane decided not to participate in the re-vote, and Gisele Akoghé took his place as the PDG candidate.

In the April 2008 local elections, Ntoutoume Emane—a Vice-President of the PDG—headed the PDG list in the 5th arrondissement of Libreville, the capital. In the 5th arrondissement the PDG achieved its best result in Libreville, with 12 out of 16 councillors; however, the party fell short of an overall majority in the city with 42 out of 98 councillors. Ntoutoume Emane was presented by the PDG as its candidate for Mayor of Libreville, and on 23 May he was elected unopposed as Mayor for a five-year term. He received 84 votes; the remaining 14 votes were invalid.

At the PDG's 9th Ordinary Congress in September 2008, Ntoutoume Emane was named as one of two Honorary Vice-Presidents of the PDG.

Reacting to the inauguration of United States President Barack Obama on 20 January 2009, Ntoutoume Emane said the event fulfilled the dream of Abraham Lincoln and Martin Luther King Jr., and he said that he had read Obama's books. He expressed optimism that Obama "has the ambition and potential to foster a real momentum for development".

After the death of President Bongo on 8 June 2009, Ntoutoume Emane ordered the closure of all nightclubs and bars in Libreville to reflect a spirit of national mourning.

Following local elections held in December 2013, Ntoutoume Emane was succeeded as Mayor by Rose Christiane Ossouka Raponda on 10 February 2014. He announced his resignation from the ruling PDG on 2 October 2015 and said that he was creating a new party, the Patriotic and Democratic Movement for the Refoundation of the Republic (Mouvement patriotique et démocratique pour la refondation de la République, MPDR).
