= Biens mal acquis =

French legal term

Biens mal acquis (lit. 'ill-gotten goods') is a phrase used in French courts for litigation seeking the repayment of assets stolen from poor countries by corrupt officials. The phrase refers to anti-corruption legal proceedings against former dictators and strongmen outside of their country, the seizure of assets within the country of the legal proceedings, and the return of the assets to the country from which they were embezzled.

Examples of biens mal acquis are government funds from former colonies of Françafrique that were spent on luxurious lifestyles and investment real estate in France. The doctrine has since been used in similar cases filed in Spain, Switzerland and Monaco, and against the Marcos family and the estate of Sani Abacha.

== Terminology ==
The phrase biens mal acquis is derived from the French proverb bien mal acquis ne profite jamais meaning "a thing dishonorably obtained never truly enriches" in English, and is generally translated to the equivalent English phrase of "ill-gotten goods". A March 2007 report by the Catholic Committee Against Hunger and for Development, titled Biens mal acquis... profitent trop souvent. La fortune des dictateurs et les complaisances occidentales (English: Ill-Gotten Goods... Too Often Do Benefit: Western Complacency and the Wealth of Dictators) enumerated known instances of kleptocracy in African dictatorships. It is estimated that $100–180 billion in assets have been diverted by national leaders through embezzlement or unnecessary expenditure in recent decades. For example, Mobutu Sese Seko, the President of Zaïre from 1965 until his death in 1997, became notorious for using his position as military dictator to openly embezzle massive sums of state money to fund an extravagant lifestyle. Mobutu had homes in France and Switzerland, and by the time of his death held a personal fortune of $5–6 billion, leaving his country with a public debt of $13 billion.

Biens mal acquis was originally used in France for anti-corruption legal proceedings filed in its own judicial system against heads of state of the Françafrique accused of misappropriating or stealing state assets for their own benefit. The phrase became associated with corrupt politicians of these poor post-colonial countries, as they and their associates often invested their illegally acquired fortunes in France. The term was later popularized for all litigation filed against any corrupt politicians of poor countries in any foreign judicial system, normally in Western Europe, where the assets stolen by the defendant are believed to be held. Seized assets from former dictators found to have misappropriated treasury funds while in power have since been returned in restitution to the governments of the countries they were stolen from. Despite being the first G8 country to ratify the United Nations Convention against Corruption, known as the Mérida Convention, France has not undertaken any restitution measures. In other cases, judicial proceedings are still underway, or opposition groups have asked for the money to be returned in some other way to the country's people because a corrupt government is still in power. Sometimes this takes the form of a development project, with negotiated milestones for the release of funds.

The Belgian Centre national de coopération au développement (CNCD), or National Center for Cooperation in Development, has defined biens mal acquis as a "fixed or liquid asset or fund which may be misappropriated and illegally removed from the public heritage, and thereby impoverishing the state". Ill-gotten goods may result from tortious or criminal activity, which has enabled heads of state to enrich themselves far beyond the level their official incomes can explain. Ill-gotten goods may stem from embezzlement, theft, or the illicit transfer of money from the state to personal accounts, from corruption or from kickbacks. Their owners often use opaque methods to hide their capital, assure themselves of impunity, particularly due to tax havens, and also assure of the complacency of developed nations.

== List of assets seized ==
This section is a list of known assets successfully seized through biens mal acquis rulings and is incomplete:

=== Gabon ===
Gabonese president Ali Bongo Ondimba is estimated to have paid €98 million to the Pozzo di Borgo family for the Soyecourt, a historic hôtel particulier on the rue de l'Université in the 7th arrondissement in central Paris.

Gabon - Assets seized from the family of Omar Bongo
- Audrey Blanche Bongo Odimba
  - rue de Longchamp, 92200 Neuilly-sur-Seine
  - 500 m^{2} 4-room apartment with garage and basement
- Édith Lucie Sassou - wife of President Omar Bongo from 1990 to 2009, daughter of Denis Sassou Nguesso, President of the Republic of the Congo.
  - avenue Rapp, 75007 Paris, 4-room apartment
  - avenue Rapp, 75007 Paris, 4-room apartment, 342 m^{2}
  - avenue Rapp, 75007 Paris, 4 room apartment, 284 m^{2}
  - rue du Mont-Boron, Nice, France
- Jean Ping - politician and Chairperson of the Commission of the African Union from 2008 to 2012, formerly married to Omar Bongo's eldest daughter, Pascaline.
  - rue Quentin-Bauchart, 75008 Paris
  - avenue d’Italie, 75013 Paris
- Jeff Thierry Arsène Jaffar Bongo Ondimba - son of President Ali Bongo Ondimba
  - Aix-en-Provence, 125 m^{2} apartment with 13 garages, purchased 2005, value €1.24 million
  - Villeneuve-Loubet, house
  - avenue Raymond-Poincarré, 75016 Paris, 4-room apartment
  - also: 2 apartments in downtown Nice, 100 and 170 m^{2}, three houses just off the Promenade des Anglais
- Omar Ben Bongo - father of President Ali Bongo
  - bd Lannes, 75016 Paris, 7-room apartment
- Omar Bongo Ondimba - President of Gabon since October 2009
  - bd Frédéric-Sterling, Nice France, 8-room house, 215 m^{2}
  - bd Frédéric-Sterling, Nice France, 7-room apartment, 170 m^{2}
  - bd Frédéric-Sterling Nice, France, 6-room apartment, 100 m^{2}
  - rue Edmond-Valentin, 75007 Paris,
  - avenue Foch, 75016 Paris, 4-room apartment
  - avenue Foch, 75016 Paris, 3-room apartment, 88 m^{2}
  - avenue Foch, 75016 Paris, 5-room apartment, 210 m^{2}
  - avenue Foch, 75016 Paris, 9-room apartment, 365 m^{2}
  - bd Flandrin, 75016 Paris
  - rue de Longchamp, 75016 Paris
  - avenue Raymond-Poincaré, 75016 Paris
  - rue Leroux, 75016 Paris
  - rue Laurent-Pichat, 75016 Paris, apartment, 219 m^{2}
- Omar Bongo - President of Gabon from 1967 to 2009, father of current President Omar Bongo Ondimba.
  - rue de la Tremoille, 75008 Paris
  - rue de la Faisanderie, 75016 Paris
  - allée des Feuillantines, 94000 Villejuif, France
- Yacine Queenie Bongo Odimba
  - rue de la Baume, 75008 Paris, hôtel particulier
  - bd Lannes, 75016 Paris
  - bd Suchet, 75016 Paris

=== Republic of the Congo ===
Republic of the Congo - Assets seized from the family of Denis Sassou Nguesso

- Denis Sassou Nguesso declares that he does not have a bank account in his name in France. Still, the investigation by the Office central de répression de la grande délinquance financière, found 112 bank accounts registered to members of his family.
  - avenue Rapp, 75007
  - villa at Vésinet
  - rue Marbeuf, 75008 Paris, 7-room apartment
- Julienne Sassou Nguesso
  - bd Saint-Denis, 92400 Courbevoie, 8 rooms, 175 m^{2}
  - bd du Général Koenig, 92200 Neuilly-sur-Seine, 7-room Hôtel particulier with inside swimming pool
- Claudia Lemboumba
  - avenue Victor-Hugo, 75016 Paris, Studio
  - rue Copernic, 75016 Paris, 6-room apartment with 2 chambres de bonne
  - avenue Turgot, 93700 Drancy, France, 6-room house
- Maurice Nguesso
  - rue Poirier-Fourrier, 95100 Argenteuil, 4-room apartment
  - villa Rochefort, 91000 Évry, France, 3-room apartment
  - bd Malesherbes, 75008 Paris
- Antoinette Tchibo Malonda, wife of Sassou Nguesso
  - avenue Niel, 75017 Paris. 9-room apartment, 328 m^{2}, bought for €2.47 million in 2007
  - 8 bank accounts (stockbroker and checking accounts) at Crédit Industriel et Commercial (CIC) and at the Crédit Lyonnais, in Paris and Boulogne-Billancourt
- Denis Christel Sassou Nguesso
  - rue de la Tour, 75016 Paris. 10-room with garage and chambre de service
- Claude Wilfrid Etoka, as trustee for Denis Christel Sassou Nguesso
  - SARPD Oil, US$500 million
- Wilfrid Nguesso
  - Mercedes-Benz S 500, €107,400
  - Mercedes-Benz ML 63 AMG, €116,000
  - Aston Martin DB9, €172,321
  - Audi Q7, €65,000
  - Land Rover, €95,000
  - Mercedes-Benz G 55 AMG, €90,000
  - Aston Martin DB7 Vantage €77,000
  - BMW X5, €75,800
  - Porsche Cayenne, €67,952
  - Toyota Land Cruiser, €40,000

=== Equatorial Guinea ===
Equatorial Guinea - Assets seized from the family of Teodoro Obiang Nguema Mbasogo

- Teodoro Nguema Obiang Mangue - Vice President of Equatorial Guinea and son of Teodoro Obiang.
  - Three Bugatti Veyrons, €1,196,000 each
  - Ferrari Enzo, €675,000
  - Maserati MC12, €709,000
  - Maybach 62, €510,479
  - Rolls-Royce Phantom Limousine, €381,000
  - Maserati Coupé Cambiocorsa, €82,000
  - Ferrari F512 M, €182,938
  - Ferrari 550 Maranello, €152,201

== List of restitutions ==
This section is a known list of restitutions made by biens mal acquis rulings and is incomplete:

Switzerland has made several restitutions:

- $658 million returned to the Philippines in 2003 after 17 years of litigation in the Philippines over the estate of the late former president Ferdinand Marcos.
- $2.4 million from the Malian dictator Moussa Traoré.
- Switzerland gave back $380 million (£260 million) in restitution to Nigeria in March 2015 from the estate of former dictator Sani Abacha, who held much of an embezzled $2.2 billion fortune in Swiss bank accounts in his name. Switzerland had previously returned $700m to Nigeria from Abacha's Swiss accounts in the first restitution of its kind.
- $80 million diverted by the family of Peruvian president Alberto Fujimori, who was convicted of corruption in 2015. Fujimori had already gotten a 25-year sentence in 2009 for ordering the deaths of twenty people in 2005, and the sentence for embezzlement will run concurrent to his murder sentence(s).

The United Kingdom has also returned to Nigeria funds that Sani Abacha had sheltered in Jersey in the Channel Islands.

Following the Iraq War in 2003, the United States and its allies seized more than $2 billion from the family of Iraqi dictator Saddam Hussein, the single largest restitution to date, which was slated to be used to rebuild Iraq..

== Current expropriation proceedings ==
=== Spain ===
In May 2009, the Spanish anti-corruption prosecutor requested a money-laundering investigation of the accounts and investments in Spain of the president of Equatorial Guinea, Teodoro Obiang, following a complaint filed in December 2008 by the Asociacion pro derechos humanos de España (APDHE). The association was concerned by a transfer of roughly €19 million between 2000 and 2003 from the US bank Riggs Bank to an account in a Spanish bank in the Balearic Islands.

=== France ===
Laws put into effect after the liberation of France in the Second World War targeted illegitimate profits accrued during the German occupation, in the black market or through simple theft. The ordinances of October 18, 1944 and January 6, 1945, drew inspiration from the following principle: "The most elementary fiscal justice requires that all gains made possible by the presence of the enemy be returned to the public treasury. It is unacceptable that while the nation became impoverished some enriched themselves at its expense."

Citing this precedent, in March 2007 Survie, the Sherpa Association and the Fédération des Congolais de la Diaspora filed charges of conspiracy and concealment of diversion of funds in the Tribunal de Grande Instance in Paris against five heads of African states and their families:

- Omar Bongo Ondimba (Gabon),
- Denis Sassou Nguesso (Republic of Congo)
- Blaise Compaoré (Burkina Faso)
- Eduardo Dos Santos (Angola)
- Teodoro Obiang (Equatorial Guinea)

The three NGO organizations suspected these heads or former heads of state of buying up a surprising number of luxury real estate assets in France, and of holding banking assets in French banks and/or foreign banks doing business in France. An investigation opened in June 2007 was characterized as insufficiently detailed and suspended in November 2007. The French newspaper Le Monde obtained transcripts for the hearing into whether to pursue the investigation and in January 2008 published a list of dozens of real estate properties owned by family members of Sassou Nguesso and Omar Bongo in Paris and in the south of France, some of them worth millions of euros. Maître William Bourdon of Survie, the plaintiffs' legal representation, denounced the decision to close the case as "astounding" (ahurissant) The family of Omar Bongo Ondimba, according to the Le Monde hearing transcripts, owned 33 apartments or houses including a hôtel particulier in Paris worth more than €18 million. The hôtel particulier was purchased in June 2007 by a real estate company associated with two children of the Gabonese president, then aged 13 and 16. The family of Sassou Nguesso owned at least 18 apartments or houses in France. In Gabon, an association christened Touche pas à mon président (Don't touch my president) was formed in July 2008 to protest the NGOs denouncing the real estate assets of Omar Bongo.

On December 2, 2008, Transparency International France, the Sherpa Association, and a Gabonese citizen named Grégory Ngbwa Mintsa filed new charges against Omar Bongo, Denis Sassou Nguesso and Teodoro Obiang as well as their entourages, of concealing the embezzlement of public funds.

Patrick Maisonneuve, the lawyer for Omar Bongo, announced the same day that a defamation complaint would be filed based on the allegations of embezzlement, intimidation and corruption, but as of May 2009, no such complaint had been filed. On December 5 Congolese government spokesman Alain Akouala Atipault announced that the Congo had filed a complaint in the Tribunal de grande instance of Paris against Transparency International France and Sherpa. "I have simply decided that my lawyer in Paris will pursue these gentlemen (TI and Sherpa), who are in reality a few bourgeois in Neuilly who may never even have set foot in the Congo", declared Sassou Nguesso. On December 31, 2008, Grégory Ngbwa Mintsa, a party to the complaint in France, was questioned and imprisoned for "possession of a document with intent to distribute it for propaganda purposes" and "oral or written propaganda with intent to incite revolt against the authorities," with, on January 7, three leaders of a Gabonese NGO and a journalist as a result of a complaint filed by Fondation Omar Bongo. On January 8, Thierry Lévy, a lawyer for the Gabonese, was prevented by the border police at Roissy Airport in Paris from boarding a plane for a flight to Libreville, his four-day visa having been cancelled by the Gabonese authorities "for security reasons". The conditional release of the four on January 12 was accompanied by a mandat de dépôt.

January 20, 2009 the Congolese journalist Bruno Ossébi, who had expressed the intention of joining the complaint, was the victim of a fire at his home in Brazzaville where he, his girlfriend and her two children died in the fire. Bruno Ossébi suffered second-degree burns but had been recovering when he died suddenly on February 2 in Brazzaville. According to Reporters without Borders, who said it was "probable" that the fire was a deliberate attack, Ossḗbi had three days earlier published an article on the online news site Mwinga alleging that the national petroleum corporation, managed by the president's son, had approached a French bank about a $100 million loan secured by its oil production, in contravention of Congo's pledges to the International Monetary Fund. He had made contact with the Stolen Goods Recovery Initiative at the World Bank, just two days earlier. The day after Ossébi's death, a fire also broke out at the Orléans home of Benjamin Toungamani, who in the previous December filed a complaint with French police against unknown persons because of death threats against his family. At the request of the prosecution, the decision in this case, scheduled for the end of February, was pushed back until after the visit of French President Nicolas Sarkozy to the Republic of the Congo at the end of March.

On May 5, 2009, the most senior investigating judge in Paris, Françoise Desset, agreed to hear the case, a decision the prosecutor appealed. On October 29, 2009, the Paris Court of Appeal upheld the Ministry and found that Transparency International lacked standing. Following the association's appeal the French Court of Cassation, the court of final appeal, on November 9, 2010, found that Transparency International could participate in the suit, henceforth allowing a French examining magistrate to investigate.

A February 2011 alert from Tracfin, the money-laundering unit of the French finance ministry, mentioned a purchase by Obiang's son of €18 million worth of fine art in February 2009 alone. On October 6, 2011, Transparency International France and Sherpa Association announced a new complaint in civil court to circumvent the block by the prosecutor's office, which had been refusing an indictment needed for the examining magistrates to deal with new facts discovered in the course of their investigation. On July 12, 2012, the examining magistrates in charge of the investigation issued an international arrest warrant for Teodorin Nguema Obiang following his refusal to appear. For Maud Perdriel-Vaissière, director of Sherpa, this step demonstrated "the seriousness of the allegations Sherpa has been making from the first [...] and show that nobody should believe themselves above law. From now on, immunity is no longer a synonym of impunity".

March 19, 2014, the juges d'instruction of the Tribunal de Grande Instance de Paris indicted Teodorin Nguema Obiang for money laundering. In January 2024, a preliminary investigation was opened by the National Financial Prosecutor's Office (PNF) in France, for embezzlement of public funds and concealment “concerning the clothing expenses of Mahamat Idriss Déby Itno in Paris.

In April 2025, the investigating judge in charge of the investigation opened in 2010 into Gabonese assets acquired fraudulently in France announced the end of the investigations, the PNF must make its requisitions before the final decision of the investigating magistrate on the possible holding of a trial.

=== Monaco ===
On March 30, 2009, Monaco opened an investigation into accounts in the name of Édith Bongo, who died on March 14, 2009. Bongo was suspected of having acted as nominee in several banking establishments for both her husband and father, the presidents of Gabon and the Republic of the Congo, respectively, in order to mask assets obtained with diverted funds. The investigation was opened following a letter from the Sherpa Association to Prince Albert II and to the prosecutor of Monaco, requesting an investigation and the freezing of Édith Bongo's financial assets in Monaco.

=== Switzerland ===
On April 30, 2009, Switzerland extended the freezing of 8.3 million Swiss francs in an account in Mobutu Sese Seko,'s name, originally instituted on May 17, 1997. On February 12, 2009, the federal office of the Swiss justice system ordered the restitution to Haiti of 7 million Swiss francs (€4.6 million) frozen in Swiss bank accounts since 1986, to finance development projects. Former Haitian dictator Jean-Claude Duvalier filed an appeal of this decision on March 19, 2009.

== See also ==
- French criminal law
