= William Bourdon =

French lawyer (born 1956)

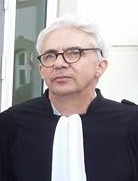
- Born: 1956 (age 69–70); Neuilly-sur-Seine, France
- Education: Lycée Janson-de-Sailly, Pantheon-Sorbonne University, Sciences Po
- Occupation: Lawyer

William Bourdon (born 1956) is a French lawyer of the Paris Bar Association who practices criminal law, particularly specializing in white-collar crime and human rights.

He initiated the first legal proceedings in France against individuals responsible for crimes against humanity, particularly those from Serbia and Rwanda. He also represented Franco-Chilean families who were victims of dictator Augusto Pinochet.

Through the NGO Sherpa, which he founded in 2001, Bourdon developed an innovative legal strategy to hold multinational corporations and political leaders accountable for serious human rights violations, corruption, and environmental damage. He is a central figure in the Biens mal acquis (Ill-Gotten Gains) case, targeting the illicit wealth accumulated by several African heads of state.

His firm remains specialized in defending whistleblowers and persecuted political opponents, including Alexei Navalny, a prominent Russian opponent of Vladimir Putin.

== Biography ==
=== Criminal and correctional courts ===
In France, Bourdon gained public attention through his work in criminal courts and occasionally in correctional courts. He has been involved in several high-profile cases:

- in 1982, he defended Issei Sagawa, a Japanese man accused of killing and cannibalizing a Dutch student
- in 1987, he represented undocumented Algerian sex workers in the trial of commissaire de police Jobic
- in 1990, he acted as a negotiator during the hostage crisis at Xerox in La Défense
- in 1995, he defended Alexei Polevoy, a young Russian accused of murdering six family members and acquaintances
- in 2003, he defended two French detainees at Guantánamo Bay

=== Human rights ===
William Bourdon served on the board of directors of France Libertés, alongside Danielle Mitterrand, for whom he was a lawyer for many years. For 20 years, he worked with the International Federation for Human Rights, holding positions such as Deputy Secretary-General (1994–1995) and Secretary-General (1995–2000).

Notable cases:

- Tiananmen Square Massacre (1989): Bourdon, alongside Jean-Pierre Mignard, launched the "Ten Thousand Lawyers for China" appeal, receiving global support.
- Kurdish Cause: Bourdon investigated Turkish special forces' abuses in Kurdistan and PKK crimes. With Danielle Mitterrand, he advocated for the Kurdish cause at the United Nations, particularly with then-UN Secretary-General Boutros Boutros-Ghali.
- Rwandan genocide (1995): Bourdon targeted Wenceslas Munyeshyaka, a Rwandan priest suspected of participating in massacres and rapes during the Tutsi genocide. Despite an initial dismissal, Bourdon secured a ruling that French courts could prosecute international crimes.
- Yugoslavia Massacres (1995): Outraged by atrocities against Bosniaks, Bourdon used Article 689-2 of the French Code of Criminal Procedure to attempt to prosecute war criminals in France. Despite support from Bosnian families and Françoise Bouchet-Saulnier (Médecins Sans Frontières aka Doctors Without Borders), the Cour de Cassation ultimately refused jurisdiction due to the absence of suspects in France.
- Pinochet Case (1998): Bourdon worked with Franco-Chilean families to prosecute Augusto Pinochet, who was arrested in London. He secured a ruling that French courts could suspend the statute of limitations for crimes due to the disappearance of victims' bodies. He also documented the horrors of Colonia Dignidad, a secret Chilean prison run by a former Nazi. His efforts led to arrest warrants and key witness testimonies.
- Hissène Habré Case (2000): Bourdon and Reed Brody (Human Rights Watch) filed a complaint on behalf of the International Federation for Human Rights against Hissène Habré, the former Chadian president accused of ordering the deaths of 40,000 people and torturing tens of thousands. In 2016, Habré was sentenced to life imprisonment for crimes against humanity, rape, and torture by the Dakar Court of Appeals. In 2017, he was also ordered to pay €125 million in compensation to victims.

=== Sherpa and ill-gotten gains ===
==== Corporate social responsibility ====
In 2001, Bourdon founded Sherpa, an NGO dedicated to defending victims of economic crimes, including pollution, corruption, and indecent working conditions. Based in the offices of France Libertés in Paris, Sherpa became in France a key player in holding multinational corporations accountable. Bourdon served as its president until 2017.

Notable cases:

- Total in Myanmar: in the 1990s, Total – a French petroleum company – operated a gas field in Myanmar, involving forced labor under military supervision. Bourdon used a 1946 ordonnance to bypass the lack of criminal qualification for forced labor. In 2005, he secured a €5.2 million settlement for Burmese refugees, funding reception centers.
- Areva in Niger: Areva is a French multinational group specializing in nuclear power. In 2005, Sherpa exposed a cancer epidemic among former Areva workers linked to uranium extraction in Niger. Bourdon negotiated a compensation mechanism for victims, operational from 2009 to 2012.

==== Ill-gotten gains ====
In 2006, Bourdon, along with Antoine Dulin and Jean Merckaert (CCFD-Terre Solidaire), published a report on biens mal acquis (ill-gotten gains) by African heads of state in France. Despite a 2008 dismissal under political pressure, a new complaint was filed by Transparency International France the same year. After a legal battle, the Cour de Cassation recognized in 2010 the right of anti-corruption associations to take legal action, marking a victory for civil society.

Families of prosecuted leaders:

- Teodoro Obiang (Equatorial Guinea): in 2010, a 10-day raid was conducted at Obiang's Paris mansion. His son was sentenced in 2017 to 3 years in prison (suspended), a €30 million fine, and the confiscation of €150 million in assets. The Court of Appeals upheld the ruling in 2020, and the Cour de Cassation confirmed it in 2021. Equatorial Guinea retaliated by accusing Bourdon and Daniel Lebègue (Transparency International) of judicial neocolonialism.
- Omar Bongo (former Gabonese leader)
- Denis Sassou-Nguesso (Republic of the Congo leader)
- Arab Spring (2011): Sherpa and Transparency International filed multiple complaints against deposed leaders (Tunisia, Egypt, Libya). Bourdon revealed that billions of dollars had been embezzled and transferred in cash to Dubai, which became a new hub for kleptocratic funds.
- Karim Wade (2013): in 2013, the trial of Karim Wade, son of the former Senegalese president, began in Dakar for illicit enrichment. Convicted in 2015 to 6 years in prison and asset confiscation, this case marked the first time in Africa that former officials were prosecuted for looting public resources.

=== Whistleblowers ===
Since the 2000s, Bourdon has defended numerous whistleblowers, playing a key role in exposing major financial and political scandals:

- Hervé Falciani (HSBC, Swiss Leaks, Lagarde list): in 2008, Falciani, a former HSBC employee, provided France with a hard drive containing data on undeclared Swiss accounts of French clients. This led to the repatriation of hundreds of millions of euros to France. Convicted in 2015 by Switzerland for economic espionage, he avoided extradition thanks to Spain.
- Antoine Deltour (LuxLeaks): in 2012, Deltour exposed Luxembourg’s tax rulings, tools used by multinationals for tax optimization. Initially convicted, he was acquitted on appeal in 2018, marking a victory for tax transparency.
- Edward Snowden: in 2015, Bourdon met Snowden in Moscow to explore exile solutions. However, leaving Russia risked extradition to the U.S. due to an outstanding arrest warrant.
- Rui Pinto (Football Leaks & Luanda Leaks): Pinto exposed the financial mechanisms of Isabel dos Santos (daughter of Angola’s former president), estimated at $10 billion. Extradited to Portugal, his trial concluded in April 2023. His revelations were used by the International Consortium of Investigative Journalists (ICIJ).
- Nicolas Forissier (UBS): Forissier exposed UBS Switzerland's practices, leading to a historic conviction in 2019: the bank was found guilty of illegal solicitation and money laundering of tax fraud, with an initial fine of €4 billion (reduced on appeal in 2021).

Bourdon is also known for his institutional engagement with:

- PPLAAF (2017): Bourdon co-founded the Platform to Protect Whistleblowers in Africa (PPLAAF in French) with Henri Thulliez. This NGO defends whistleblowers and exposes major scandals like Congo Hold-Up and State Capture, involving figures such as billionaire Dan Gertler, accused of looting the Congo's mineral resources.
- Alerta (2023): in 2023, Bourdon contributed to the launch of Alerta, a sister organization of PPLAAF dedicated to Latin America.

== Filmography as himself ==
- 2006 : Bamako by Abderrahmane Sissako (Prix Lumière du meilleur film francophone 2007)

== Bibliography ==
- Petit manuel de désobéissance citoyenne , JC Lattès, 2014.
- La Cour pénale internationale – Le Statut de Rome, avec Emmanuelle Duverger, Le Seuil, 2000.
- Face aux crimes du marché. Quels armes juridiques pour les citoyens? Suivi de 39 propositions, La Découverte, 2010.
- Les Dérives de l'état d'urgence (avec la participation de ses collaborateurs), éditions Plon, 2017
- Sur le fil de la défense, éditions du Cherche-Midi, 2023
