= Centre national de coopération au développement =

Belgian non-governmental organization

The Centre national de coopération au développement (CNCD-11.11.11) is a Belgian non-governmental organization for international solidarity that has been active since 1966.

This French-language association includes eighty associations and NGOs, as well as social organizations whose goal is a world where legitimate and adequately financed states cooperate to ensure peace and the fundamental rights of all.

== Composition and actions ==
The CNCD-11.11.11 was founded on a fundamental value of cooperation in development: solidarity. The CNCD-11.11.11 unites more than eighty development organizations and thousands of volunteers and sympathizers.

Since 1966, the CNCD-11.11.11 has pursued three missions : questioning public and private power, public education on the international staked and the financing of development programs such as Operation 11.11.11.

=== Questioning ===
As coordination, the CNCD-11.11.11 questions national and international actors about their responsibilities for cooperation in development and international solidarity. Through these political actions, CNCD-11.11.11 targets both a stronger realization of the real causes of misdevelopment and the promotion of measures that favor the relations between peoples based on justice and the respect of fundamental individual and collective rights.

=== Educating ===
Development education targets a change of values and attitudes on both the individual and collective levels with a goal of social change. The CNCD-11.11.11 carries out education and information campaigns and population mobilization, with the help of member organizations. These campaigns center on such themes as north–south relations, access to economic and social rights, food sovereignty, citizen engagement in elections, the abolition of third-world debt and climate justice. They rely on information and animation tools, public advocacy and organization of events.

=== Financing ===
The Operation 11.11.11, the CNCD-11.11.11 is able to finance 50 programs each year in Africa, Latin America, The Middle East and Asia. These projects offer solutions to daily problems faced by the population in the areas of health, education and community organization.

=== Member Associations of CNCD-11.11.11 ===
- Action et Coopération pour le développement dans les Andes (ACDA)
- achACT: (clean clothing drives, etc)
- ADPM
- Afghanistan-Europe
- Africa 2000
- Aide au Développement Gembloux (ADG)
- Aquadev
- Asmae
- Association Angkor-Belgique: sponsors disadvantaged orphans in Cambodia.
- Association Belgo-Palestinienne
- Association pour l'action de développement communautaire
- Auto-développement pour l'Afrique
- Autre Terre - sustainable economic development
- Comité pour abolition des dettes illégitimes (CADTM) - (Committee for the Abolition of Illegitimate Debt)
- Caritas Internationalis
- Centre Placet asbl
- Centre d'Éducation Populaire André Genot (CEPAG) - civic empowerment
- Centre Tricontinental (CETRI) - development information clearinghouse
- General Confederation of Liberal Trade Unions of Belgium (CGMD)
- Centre générale des syndicats libéraux de Belgie (CGSLB)
- CIRÉ'
- CNA-NKO -exchange students
- Commission Justice et Paix
- Communauté mauritanienne de Belgique
- COTA asbl
- Conseil supérieur de l'audiovisuel (Belgique) (CSA)
- CSC
- Dynamo international
- Echos Communication
- Education globale & développement
- Entraide & Fraternité (Brotherhood and Mutual Aid)
- Escale Nord-Sud asbl
- Espérance Revivre au Congo
- Femmes Prévoyantes Socialistes
- FERAD
- General Federation of Belgian Labour (FGTB)
- FIAN Belgium
- Foncaba supports African civil society
- Fonds André Ryckmans
- Forum Nord-Sud
- Frères des Hommes
- Frontière de vie
- Forum Universitaire pour la Coopération Internationale au Développement (FUCID)
- Groupe de Recherche pour une Stratégie économique alternative (GRESEA)
- IDAY Belgique
- Ingénieurs sans frontières, Engineers Without Borders
- Intal
- ITECO
- Laïcité & humanisme en Afrique centrale
- Le Monde selon les femmes
- Le Village du monde
- Ligue des Familles
- Louvain Coopération
- Médecine pour le Tiers-Monde
- Médecins du Monde
- Memisa
- Miel Maya Honing
- Mouvement d'Actions à Travers-Monde
- Mouvement ouvrier chrétien
- ONG Partenaire
- Oxfam - Magasins du monde
- Oxfam-Solidarité
- PAC - Agir pour la Culture
- Petits pas
- Peuples Solidaires
- Pro-Action Développement asbl
- PROTOS
- Quinoa
- RéSO-J
- RCN Justice & Démocratie
- Service D'Information et de Formation Amérique Latine (SEDIF)
- SELAVIP
- Service civil international
- Service Laique de Cooperation au Développement (SLCD)
- Société de Saint-Vincent de Paul
- Solidarité Afghanistan Belgique
- Solidarité mondiale
- Solidarité Protestante
- Solidarité socialiste
- SOS Faim
- Tourisme Autrement
- UniverSud-Liège
- Vétérinaires Sans Frontières'
