= FDH =

FDH may refer to:

== Biology, health and medicine ==
- (-)-Endo-fenchol dehydrogenase

== Other uses ==
- Daglish railway station, in Western Australia
- FDH Bank, Malawi
- Freies Deutsches Hochstift, a foundation in Frankfurt, Germany
- Frères des Hommes, a French aid organization
- Friedrichshafen Airport in Friedrichshafen, Germany
- Full Domain Hash
- Fukuoka Daiei Hawks, a Nippon Professional Baseball team existed from 1989 to 2004, currently Fukuoka SoftBank Hawks since 2005.
