= Louvain (disambiguation) =

Louvain or Leuven is the capital of the province of Flemish Brabant in the Flemish Region, Belgium.

Louvain may also refer to:

- Louvain-la-Neuve, a planned city in the municipality of Ottignies-Louvain-la-Neuve, Belgium
- Académie Louvain, a network of French-speaking Catholic universities in Belgium active between 2004 and 2015
- Counts of Louvain, a branch of the Lotharingian House of Reginar
- Louvain Coopération, a Belgian international non-governmental organization

== See also ==
- Louvain Modularity, a method to detect communities in graphs
- University of Leuven (disambiguation)
