= FDHS =

FDHS may refer to:

- Ferjeselskapet Drøbak–Hurum–Svelvik, a defunct Norwegian ferry company
- Field Deployable Hydrolysis System
- Fort Defiance High School, in Fort Defiance, Virginia, United States
- Fort Dorchester High School, in North Charleston, South Carolina, United States
- Frederick Douglass High School (disambiguation)

== See also ==
- FDH (disambiguation)
