= LuxLeaks =

Financial scandal revealed in November 2014

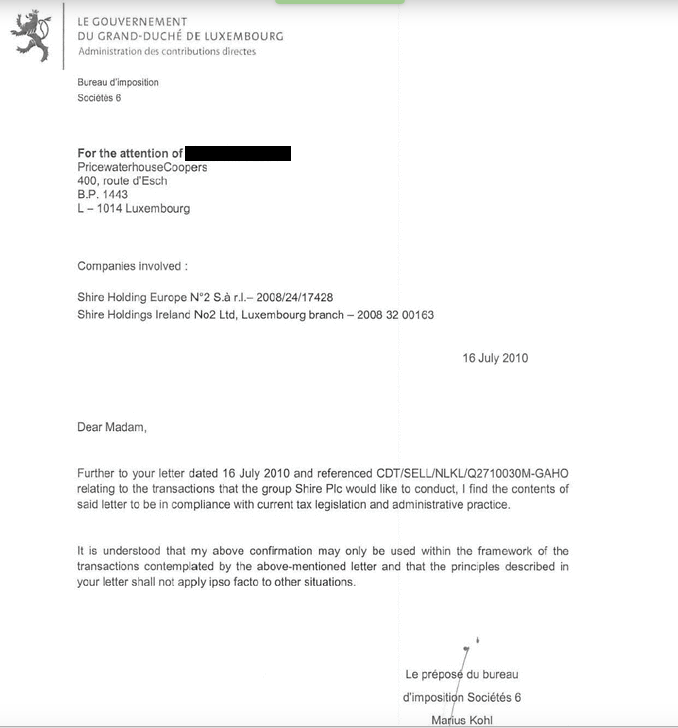
One of the leaked tax rulings signed by Marius Kohl

Luxembourg Leaks (sometimes shortened to Lux Leaks or LuxLeaks) is the name of a financial scandal revealed in November 2014 by a journalistic investigation conducted by the International Consortium of Investigative Journalists. It is based on confidential information about Luxembourg's tax rulings set up by PricewaterhouseCoopers from 2002 to 2010 to the benefits of its clients. This investigation resulted in making available to the public tax rulings for over three hundred multinational companies based in Luxembourg.

The LuxLeaks' disclosures attracted international attention and comment about tax avoidance schemes in Luxembourg and elsewhere. This scandal contributed to the implementation of measures aiming at reducing tax dumping and regulating tax avoidance schemes beneficial to multinational companies.

The judicial aspects of this case concern the persons charged by Luxembourg justice for participating in the revelations. No multinational company was charged. The LuxLeaks trial took place in spring 2016 and led to the condemnation of the two whistleblowers. The appeal trial's judgment delivered in March 2017 confirmed their condemnation. Following a new appeal, the Luxembourg higher Court rendered in January 2018 a distinct judgment for the two defendants and fully granted the whistleblower status for one of them.

== Revelations ==
=== Two waves of ICIJ revelations ===
On 5 November 2014, the Washington, D.C.–based International Consortium of Investigative Journalists (ICIJ) released LuxLeaks investigation. Eighty journalists from media organizations around the globe had been involved in collaboratively reviewing 28,000 pages of documents. All documents are available online in a searchable database categorized by industry and corporation published by the ICIJ and by other websites. The documents disclose tax rulings between Luxembourg and more than 340 companies worldwide aiming at reducing their tax payments. The Luxembourg Leaks provide insight into 548 tax rulings, dating from 2002 to 2010.

On 9 December 2014, ICIJ revealed new names of about 30 large companies benefiting from tax rulings and tax avoidance schemes in Luxembourg. This second wave is labeled "LuxLeaks 2" in complement to the first revelation wave in November labeled "LuxLeaks 1".

The LuxLeaks revelations have had a worldwide impact, as ICIJ partnered its investigations with many media around the world: CNBC (USA), CBC (Canada), The Irish Times (Ireland), Le Monde (France), Tagesanzeiger (Switzerland), Süddeutsche Zeitung (Germany), The Asahi Shimbun (Japan), El Confidencial (Spain) and many others.

After publishing the LuxLeaks investigation, ICIJ was awarded one of the United States' top journalism awards, the George Polk Awards in the Business Reporting category (ICIJ is jointly awarded for 2 other investigations) in February 2015. ICIJ was also awarded 'Investigation of the Year' for the LuxLeaks and SwissLeaks investigations at the Data Journalism Awards in June 2015.

Although the ICIJ LuxLeaks and WikiLeaks show similarity in names and operating mode (as international, online, non-profit, journalistic organisations publishing confidential or secret information), this does not imply any known connection between them.

=== Luxembourgish tax regime illuminated ===
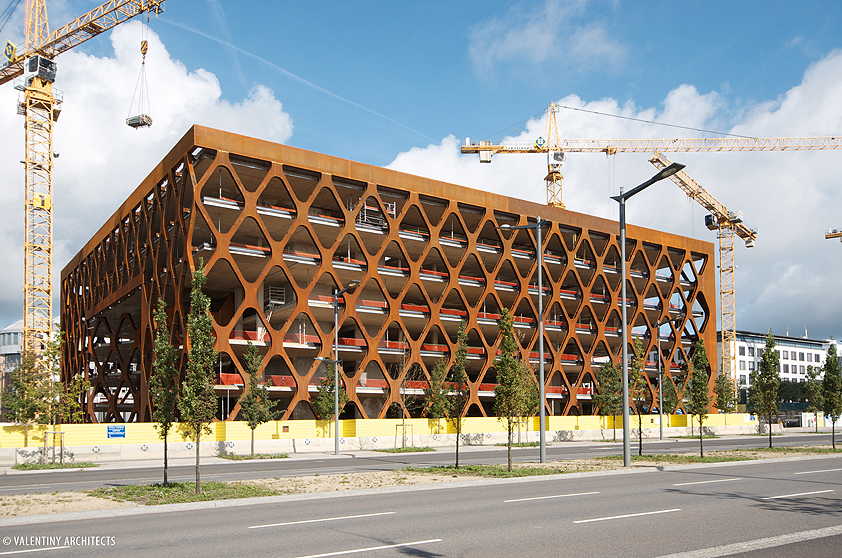
KPMG builds a new office building for 1,600 staff in Luxembourg.

LuxLeaks revelations shed light on the Luxembourgish tax regime, highly beneficial to multinational companies. Foreign corporations started settling in Luxembourg in large numbers in the early 1990s, when Luxembourg transposed in its national law an EU directive that allowed companies to pay taxes in a European headquarters country other than where their subsidiaries operated.

Tax rulings are set up by large accounting firms (the "Big Four") for the benefits of their clients, multinational companies, and then approved by the Luxembourgish tax administration. Tax rulings include schemes to transfer revenues to Luxembourg. Transfer pricing is one of the mechanisms used by multinational corporations to reallocate profits. Intragroup loans are another possible mechanism: a company based in a high-tax country makes a loan at a low interest rate to a subsidiary in Luxembourg. The interest rate reflects the credit rating of the company group, for example 1%. The subsidiary in Luxembourg is typically set up with the purpose of loaning money at high interest rates, for example 9%, back to another subsidiary outside Luxembourg. Since the tax regime in Luxembourg is tailored to be advantageous for the financial arm of multinational companies, the profits generated there are taxed at very low rates. Such mechanisms are effective means to erode tax bases in countries with high tax rates and to shift profits to countries where they are less taxed (see also Base erosion and profit shifting).

In many cases the companies' presence in Luxembourg is only symbolic. For instance, 1,600 companies are registered at the same address – 5, rue Guillaume Kroll – in Luxembourg.

=== Tax rulings legality under question ===
The legality of tax rulings is under question. Even if they exist in many European countries, tax rulings tend to become considered as state aids able to distort competition. The European Commission Directorate-General for Competition launched several investigations in the last years.

In October 2015, the European Commission concluded that the tax deals in favour of Fiat Finance and Trade in Luxembourg and Starbucks in the Netherlands are illegal state aid. During her press conference, the European Commission Competition Commissioner Margrethe Vestager confirmed: "We used the information coming from the LuxLeaks as market information [...] The whistleblower also plays an important role here."

Following the LuxLeaks revelations, several investigations were launched against other multinational companies. Between 2015 and 2018, the McDonald's company was subject to an investigation launched by the European Commission Directorate-General for Competition. It looked into a system of licenses paid by the European subsidiaries of McDonald's to its Luxembourg branch. More than one billion Euros of tax loss for the European states between 2009 and 2013 would be at stake. In September 2018, the European Commission concluded that Luxembourg did not breach the rules as regards its tax treatment of McDonald's. McDonald's didn't wait for the investigations' conclusions and announces in December 2016 the moving of its tax branch from Luxembourg to the United Kingdom. Investigations are also now opened against Amazon in 2014, against GDF-Suez (now Engie) in 2016 and against IKEA in 2017 for their tax schemes in Luxembourg.

On 11 January 2016, the European Commission concluded that the preferential tax system established since 2005 in Belgium was illegal. Consequently, thirty-five large multinational companies which benefited from this illegal tax system will have to reimburse a tax shortfall estimated to at least 700 million Euros.

== LuxLeaks impacts ==
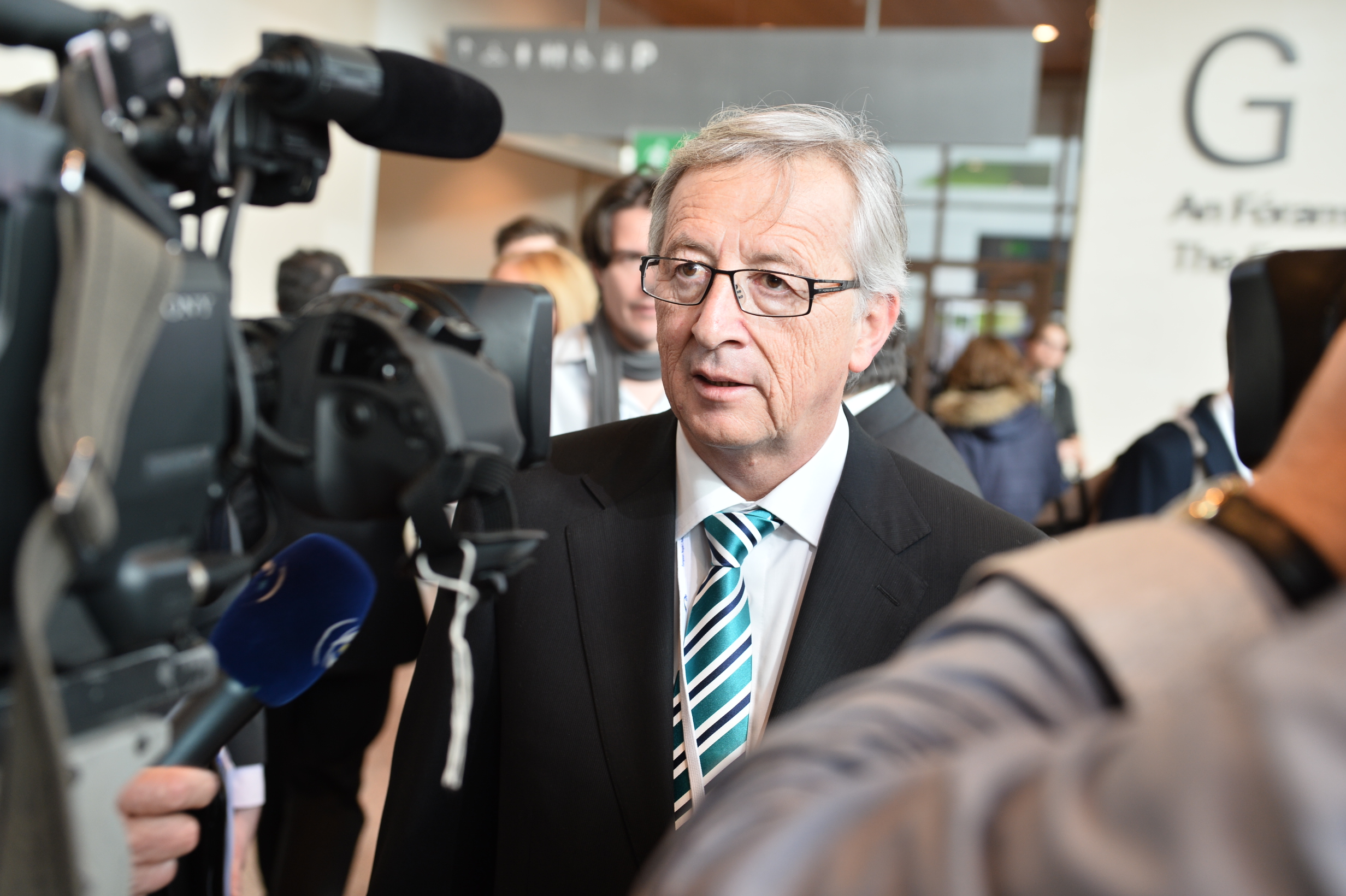
Jean-Claude Juncker

When revealed, LuxLeaks impact on the public opinion was particularly high, as it put in front line the controversial role of Jean-Claude Juncker, president of the European Commission newly appointed a few days before LuxLeaks revelations. Juncker was Luxembourg's prime minister at the time when many of his country's tax-avoidance rules were enacted. Luxembourg's finance minister, Pierre Gramegna, described the leak as "the worst attack" his country had ever experienced. The LuxLeaks raised discussion on tax avoidance in Luxembourg and other countries.

=== Follow up in the European Parliament ===
Following the LuxLeaks scandal, anti-EU groups at the European Parliament, including the UK Independence Party and France's National Front, proposed a motion of censure against European Commission's team with J.C. Juncker as its president. On 27 November 2014, the vote led to the European Parliament rejecting the motion of censure, as mainstream political groups supported Jean-Claude Juncker.

On 12 February 2015, the European Parliament set up a special committee on tax rulings in the European Union Member States. The committee is composed of 45 members and initially had six months to report its findings. This special committee was preferred to a committee of inquiry which would have implied a higher power of inquiry. This choice is considered by some parliamentarians as a political willingness not to embarrass Jean-Claude Juncker. In the context of its investigations, the special committee requested information to the Commission and Member States, it commissioned research briefings, held public hearings and Committee's delegations visited several countries in Europe. The Committee facing multinational corporations' unwillingness to testify threatened to revoke their lobbyists' accreditation. On 26 October 2015, the committee published at the end of its mandate a report with several recommendations: country-by-country reporting of multinationals' activities; introducing Common Consolidated Corporate Tax Base (CCTB) in Europe; including the European Commission into the tax rulings automatic information sharing; better protection for whistleblowers. At the end of November 2015, the report was approved by the European Parliament in a plenary session vote.

The special committee of the European Parliament has been reactivated until June 2016. Reactivation of the committee follows press' disclosure of documents, which demonstrates how some countries within the European Commission have been obstructive for more than ten years regarding any reform of the systems allowing aggressive tax avoidance. The new special committee includes the same members as the initial committee. It aims at following and deepening previous investigations on tax rulings and tax policies in European Union states.

=== Follow up in the European Commission ===
The first action at the European Commission level was a Tax Transparency Package that commissioner Pierre Moscovici presented on 18 March 2015. It mainly consisted in setting up a system of automatic exchange of information on advance tax ruling between Member States' tax administrations. Non-governmental organizations (NGO) and Members of European Parliament (MEP) consider these measures insufficient as no public release of the rulings is expected. The technical document accompanying the Tax Transparency Package considers LuxLeaks as a major motive for the commission's decision to act on corporate tax avoidance. That's why some anti federalist politicians fear that the European Commission will use LuxLeaks to push for tax harmonisation.

In October 2015, European finance ministers evaluated the system of automatic exchange of information on tax rulings between Member States administrations, leaving however the European Commission and the public in general outside of this information exchange. The automatic exchange of information on advance tax ruling between Member States' tax administrations is effective since 1 January 2017.

The European Commission made a second move on 17 June 2015 by presenting an "Action Plan for Fair and Efficient Corporate Taxation in the EU". In introducing the action plan, Commissioner Pierre Moscovici said "Corporate taxation in the EU needs radical reform [and] everyone must pay their fair share". The action plan on fairer taxation proposes to re-launch the Common Consolidated Corporate Tax Base, four years after its previous attempt met Member States' opposition. It also proposes several measures in order to reach effective taxation of companies in the countries where the profits are made. The commission also published a list of Top 30 tax havens among non-EU Member States. NGOs expressed doubts that this action plan would successfully eradicate multinational companies' profit shifting and underlined the lack of willingness in acting quickly on the subject.

The European Commission released on 27 January 2016 a new Action Plan, including anti-tax avoidance measures such as the automatic exchange of key information related to multinationals' activities. However, in order to be enacted, this plan will have to be unanimously approved by the member states of the European Union. The new Action Plan has already been assessed by tax justice NGOs as being too weak a measure to counteract tax avoidance.

On 12 April 2016, the European Commission presented a new plan to tackle corporate tax dodging. A European Parliament's study estimates that EU countries lose between €50 billion and €70 billion in tax revenue every year, due to corporate income tax avoidance.

In 2016, European Member States came to an agreement on fighting against the main tax optimization tools used by companies within Europe and adopted a first Anti-Tax Avoidance Directive (ATAD). However, the final political agreement could be reached only with the inclusion of exemptions and an increased implementation time length, which are expected to weaken the effects of this deal. In spring 2017, a complementary Anti-Tax Avoidance Directive (ATAD II) was adopted to fight differences in tax treatment among firms under EU and third countries’ laws. It started to be applicable in all EU Member States as of January 2020.

In October 2016, the European Commission proposed to create a Common Consolidated Corporate Tax Base for companies operating in the EU.

=== Follow up in G-20 ===
Measures to combat tax minimization were discussed by leaders attending the 2014 G-20 Brisbane summit and included in the G-20 Leaders' Final Communiqué: "We are taking actions to ensure the fairness of the international tax system and to secure countries' revenue bases. Profits should be taxed where economic activities deriving the profits are performed and where value is created."

In November 2015, the 2015 G-20 Antalya summit adopted the action plan released by the OECD in early October. The base erosion and profit shifting plan includes a list of 15 measures. NGOs fear that this plan will not be sufficient to end multinationals tax avoidance.

=== Follow up in Luxembourg ===
LuxLeaks revelations stress the fact that tax rulings are a priori legal but secret under the law of Luxembourg. Numerous European Member States sign tax rulings (22 out of 28 States), but European statistics show that in 2014, Luxembourg is the European country having the highest number of these ongoing 'sweetheart tax deals'. After LuxLeaks revelations, tax rulings kept on being agreed in Luxembourg. The Luxembourgish tax administration indicated that 715 new tax rulings were signed in 2014 and 726 in 2015. The content of these rulings remains secret: neither the name of benefiting companies nor the tax rates obtained are known.

In May 2016, some press articles reported that Luxembourg started to propose to multinationals some verbal tax rulings instead of written ones, in order to keep them secret. Luxembourg denied this information.

In December 2016, Luxembourg government shows good will and changes its tax rules for companies, making it more difficult for multinationals to avoid paying taxes through international structure. However, in January 2017, The Guardian publishes revelations showing that Luxembourg continues obstructing tax reforms efforts in Brussels, as was the case when Jean-Claude Juncker was the Grand-Duchy Prime Minister.

In Luxembourg, LuxLeaks revelations are often considered as a national trauma due to the stigma made to the country, perceived abroad as "tied to banking secrecy". Following the LuxLeaks, the Luxembourg government set up a nation branding policy to improve the image of the country. Nevertheless, with the trial of the whistleblowers and journalist who are involved in the disclosure of the leaks, Luxembourg continued to be perceived as a tax and judicial haven.

=== Follow-up as regards whistleblower’s protection ===
Whistleblower's protection discussion is linked to the LuxLeaks revelations, due to the legal suits against those who were at the origin of the leaks that led to the Luxleaks revelations. The two whistleblowers prosecuted in Luxembourg have progressively become to symbolise the lack of whistleblowers’ protection in the EU. In 2016, Margrethe Vestager, EU Commissioner for Competition, said: "I think everyone should thank both the whistleblower and the investigative journalists who put a lot of work into this" by contributing to changing the debate about corporate taxation in Europe.

In 2016, the lack of whistleblowers’ protection became even more salient when a directive reinforcing trade secrets is adopted. Despite its exceptions foreseen for journalists and whistleblowers, this directive appears as an additional legal instrument for companies - especially large groups – in order to control the information available about them.

In April 2018, the European Commission published a directive proposal on whistleblowers’ protection. The LuxLeaks case is presented, among others, as an example of damage to the general interest revealed by whistleblowers. The Commission proposal, which foresees a broad protection for whistleblowers, is received positively by NGOs mobilised on the issue. This directive is adopted in Spring 2019, just before the end of Jean-Claude Juncker's Commission's mandate. The directive has to be transposed into national law in each EU Member State by December 2021 at the latest.

=== Follow up for accountancy and tax advisory firms ===
The tax schemes that enable multinationals to achieve aggressive tax optimisation are complex. They are often set up by specialised companies such as tax law firms or large international accounting and financial audit firms such as PwC, EY, Deloitte and KPMG (the so-called "Big Four"). The LuxLeaks scandal has highlighted the role of these tax intermediaries.

In December 2014, the British parliamentary Public Accounts Committee interviewed Kevin Nicholson (head of tax division in PwC UK) for the second time in two years. Margaret Hodge, the chairwoman of the committee, accused Nicholson of having lied in the first hearing before LuxLeaks. She said: "It's very hard for me to understand that this is anything other than a mass-marketed tax avoidance scheme," and "I think there are three ways in which you lied and I think what you are doing is selling tax avoidance on an industrial scale." Nicholson denied that PwC mass-marketed tax avoidance schemes.

On 6 February 2015, the Public Accounts Committee published the report "Tax avoidance: the role of large accountancy firms". Commenting on the report, Margaret Hodge, chairwoman of the committee, says PwC's activities represent "nothing short of the promotion of tax avoidance on an industrial scale". During its investigation, the committee heard the British subsidiary of PwC and large companies that benefited from tax rulings.

In 2018, a European directive (named DAC6) is adopted, aiming to regulate tax intermediaries’ activities. Intermediaries are required to declare to their national tax authorities any cross-border schemes designed for tax avoidance. The reporting obligation comes into force as of July 2020, but it applies to older schemes. It imposes a mandatory exchange of information between EU Member States on the matter, on a quarterly basis.

Law firms deny that they encourage tax evasion and argue that the tax schemes provided to multinationals are legal. Following LuxLeaks, Luxembourg law firms have not lost their tax optimisation activities. On the contrary, they have seen an increasing number of new clients interested in these tax avoidance practices.

Despite their role in multinational companies tax avoidance, tax intermediaries firms are consulted by the European Commission when preparing new European tax rules. This dual activity, source of multiple and institutionalised conflicts of interest, has been shown by Corporate Europe Observatory (NGO) in July 2018.

== LuxLeaks whistleblowers and their trial ==
According to the International Consortium of Investigative Journalists (ICIJ), files used for the LuxLeaks revelations come from employees or former employees of Luxembourgish subsidiaries of the international accounting firms: PwC, EY, Deloitte and KPMG (the "Big Four").

Between December 2014 and April 2015, three people were indicted in Luxembourg in connection with LuxLeaks revelations. No multinational corporation faces charges in any country or at the international level, due to the so far legality of tax rulings.

=== Antoine Deltour, main leak source ===
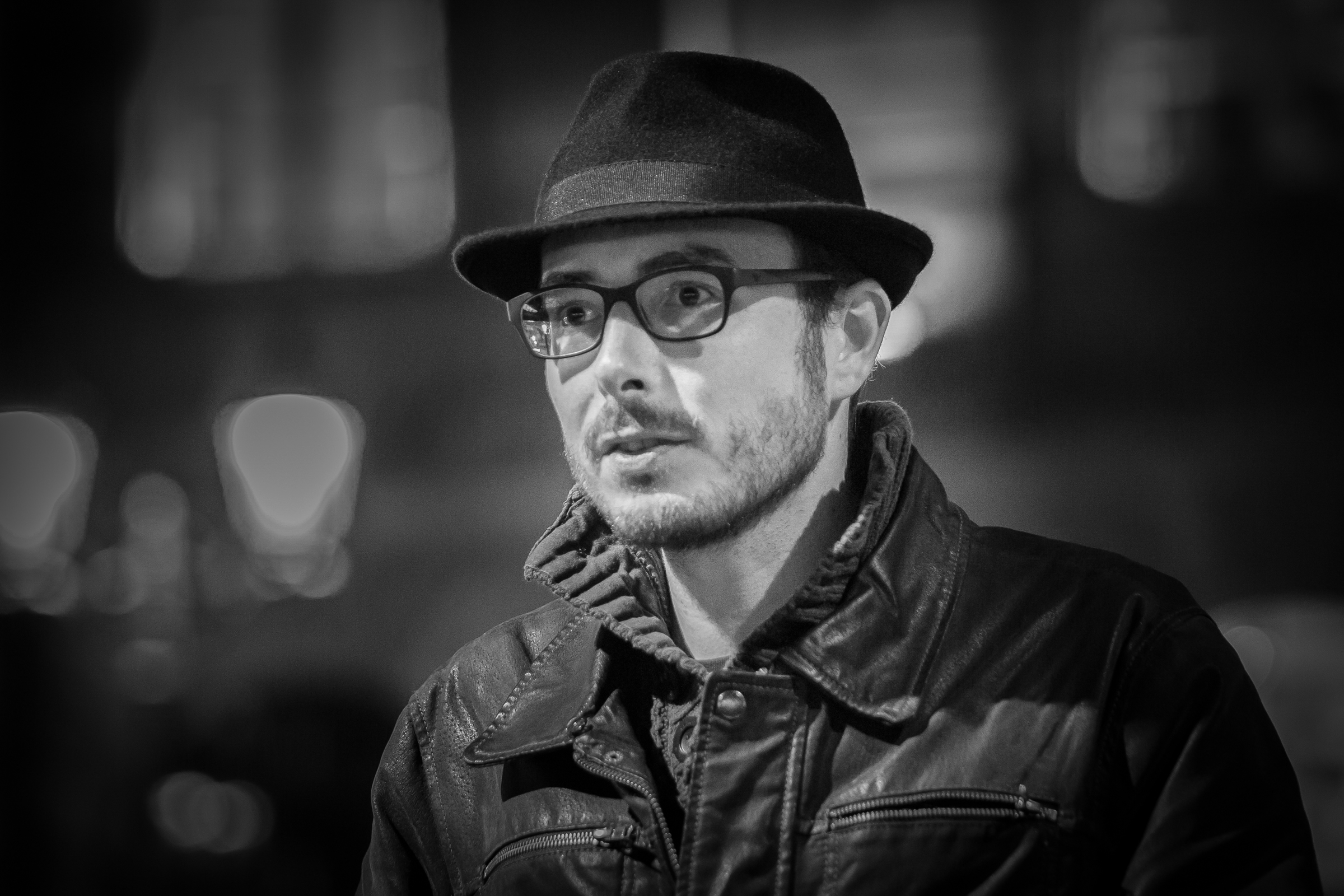
Antoine Deltour (2015)

On 12 December 2014, the Luxembourg prosecutor's office announced that an investigating judge had charged someone with theft, disclosing of confidential information and trade secrets, money laundering and fraud, following the complaint filed by PwC in 2012 against a former employee. On 14 December 2014, Antoine Deltour – a 28-year-old Frenchman – identified himself and said that his motivation was public good and not financial motivation. He stated that the files he copied were not protected and that he did not hack any system. He said he had no contact with ICIJ which had disclosed the LuxLeaks documents and he did not attempt to hide what he was doing. He copied the files because he thought "this type of data could document the tax ruling practice, which was widely unknown, especially in terms of scale."

Support to the young French whistleblower progressively grew. On 23 December 2014, more than 70 politicians, academics, union heads and charity leaders around the world signed in The Guardian an open letter in opposition to the decision by Luxembourg to prosecute Antoine Deltour. On 10 March 2015, the French newspaper Libération released an Op-Ed article signed by multiple French and International signatories including Edward Snowden, Thomas Piketty and Eva Joly. A support committee to Antoine Deltour set up a public petition that got more than 212,000 signatures in November 2016.

On 3 June 2015, Antoine Deltour was awarded the European Citizens' Prize by the European Parliament, a prize annually awarding Europeans contributing to the promotion of European citizenship and mutual cultural understanding. On 10 September 2015, Antoine Deltour was jointly nominated, together with two other whistleblowers – Stéphanie Gibaud and Edward Snowden – for the 2015 Sakharov Prize for Freedom of Thought. In December 2015, Antoine Deltour was recognized as the "Person of the Year 2015" by Tax Notes International professional magazine, for the influential role he played in shaping new international tax law.

=== Other leak sources ===
New names of companies which benefited from tax rulings were revealed in December 2014 ("LuxLeaks 2"). These names show that other leaks originated from PwC but also from other accountancy firms based in Luxembourg.

On 23 January 2015, Raphaël Halet, another former PricewaterhouseCoopers employee was charged for similar accusations as was Antoine Deltour, following the leak of 16 tax returns of US companies. This employee was fired due to the leak. His identity was kept secret until the trial began, as Halet signed a secret agreement with PwC forcing him to silence.

On 23 April 2015, the journalist Edouard Perrin was indicted in Luxembourg for being the co-author or accomplice of the offences committed by the former PwC employee charged on 23 January. Journalist organizations consider this judicial decision as an attempt against press freedom.

=== The LuxLeaks trial ===
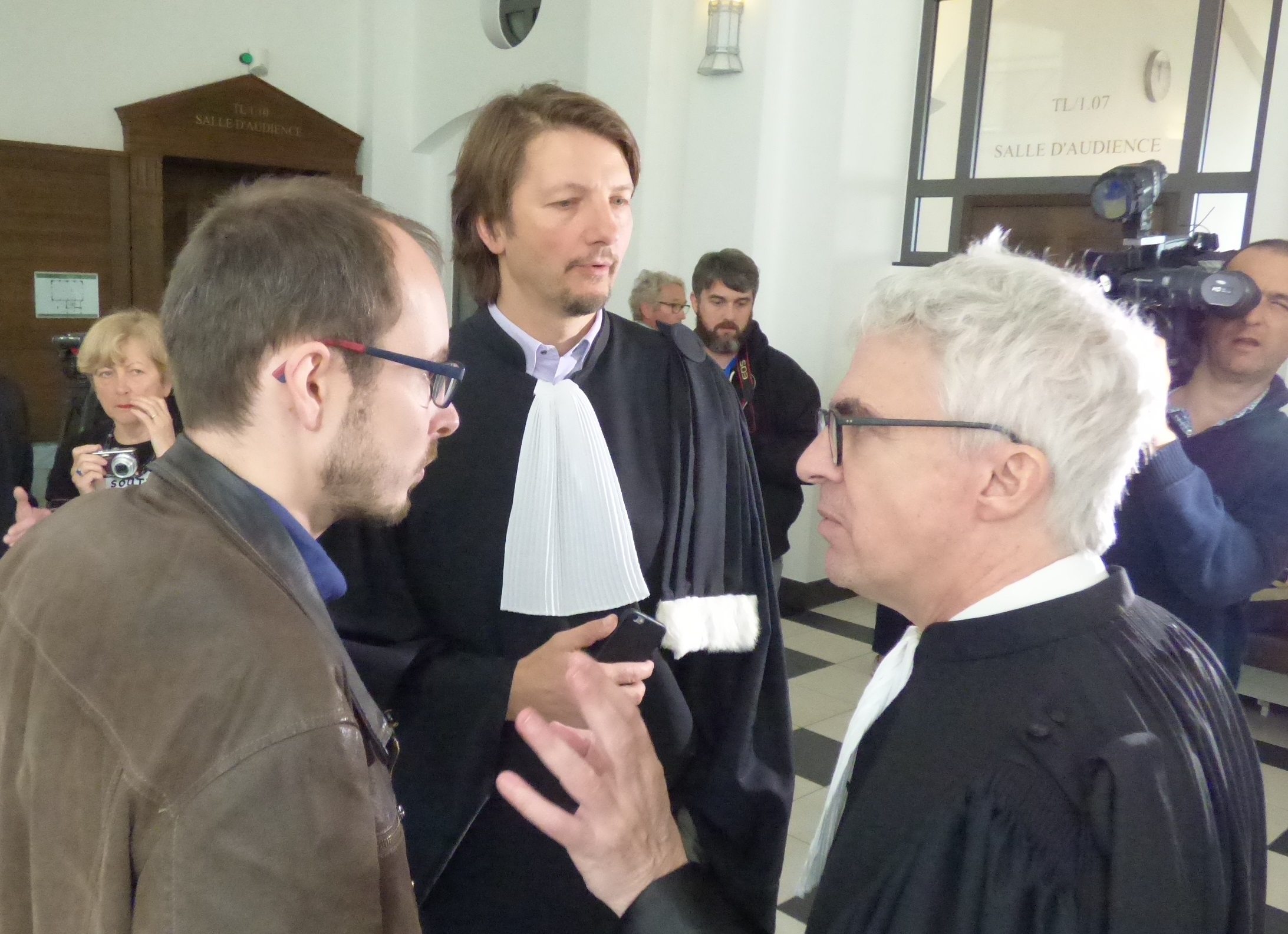
Antoine Deltour and his lawyers Philippe Penning (centre) and William Bourdon (right) at the Criminal Court of Luxembourg

Following PricewaterhouseCoopers' complaint, the trial of the three people involved in the disclosure of secret tax agreements was held from 26 April to 11 May 2016 at the Criminal Court of Luxembourg, for eight half-day hearings, instead of the five initially scheduled.

The prosecutor and lawyers for the plaintiff (PricewaterhouseCoopers) emphasized the disclosure of secret documents as an act of delinquency. According to the lawyers of the former employees of the audit firm, Antoine Deltour and Raphael Halet only acted with the motivation of defending the general interest. During their hearings, Antoine Deltour and Raphael Halet emphasized their role of whistleblowers disclosing multinational companies' aggressive tax planning practices, which are immoral and extremely detrimental to the common good. The journalist Edouard Perrin's lawyers argued that he only acted professionally and that he was not the sponsor of the leaks.

At the end of the trial, the prosecutor requested an 18-month jail sentence for the two whistleblowers (possibly a fully conditional sentence), as well as fines against them and against the journalist (of a non specified amount). PricewaterhouseCoopers' lawyers asked the defendant's conviction and 1 euro in damages. The defense lawyers pleaded for the acquittal of their clients on the basis of the freedom of expression as interpreted by the European Court of Human Rights. The judgment was delivered on 29 June 2016. Antoine Deltour received a 12-month suspended sentence and a €1,500 fine, while Raphaël Halet was sentenced to 9 months (also suspended) and a €1,000 fine. Edouard Perrin was acquitted.

The media coverage of the LuxLeaks trial was high, as it is symbolic of the current difficulties faced by whistleblowers and their insufficient protection in Europe. In 2016, the EU adopted new rules on companies' trade secrets; in the meantime, the project of a directive on the general whistleblowers' protection doesn't go ahead. The trial also raised the issue of the legitimacy of the tax practices and showed that there was significant support for the defendants.

=== Appeal ===
In July 2016, Antoine Deltour and Raphaël Halet both decided to appeal against their respective sentences. Late July, the prosecutor of Luxembourg also appealed the verdict, in order to ensure a full trial and avoid truncating the case. The acquittal of journalist Edouard Perrin was subject to review.

Before the appeal trial began, 108 MEPs signed an open letter addressed to the whistleblowers "to express [their] support and solidarity with [the whistleblowers] in light of the ongoing judicial proceedings against [them] in Luxembourg. [They] salute their courage over the past years and their tenacity in trying to overturn the 29 June verdict." Several MEPs took part in the citizen and European mobilisation, bringing together several hundred of people in front of the courthouse in Luxembourg at the opening of the appeal trial.

The appeal trial took place in Luxembourg from 12 December 2016 to 9 January 2017 and included five half-day hearings. The appeal trial mainly focused on contradictory arguments about the European Court of Human Rights' criteria used to recognize someone as a whistleblower. All the criteria were fulfilled according to Deltour and Halet's lawyers, but challenged by the prosecutor and the plaintiff. Halet's defense also argued on the illegality, at the time of the facts, of Luxembourg tax authorities policies regarding tax rulings. In his indictment, the prosecutor required reduced sentences, compared to the sentences delivered in first instance. He also requested journalist Edouard Perrin's acquittal. The defense pleaded for acquittal of each of the three defendants. Both Antoine Deltour's and Raphaël Halet's sentences were reduced as a result of their respective appeals. Deltour was given a 6-month suspended prison sentence and charged with a 1500 euro fine while Halet was given a 1000 euro fine. The journalist Edouard Perrin was acquitted. Even though they received reduced sentences, Deltour and Halet decided to appeal before the Luxembourg Court of Cassation.

=== Appeal to higher court ===
A single hearing was held on 23 November 2017 before the Luxembourg Court of Cassation. On 11 January 2018, the Court rendered a distinct judgment for the two defendants. The Court recalled that a whistleblower's action has to be appreciated as a whole. Consequently, it overturned the previous verdict against Deltour. Following three years of judicial procedures, Deltour was fully granted whistleblower status. But the Luxembourg Court of Cassation dismissed the appeal of Halet, stating that the documents he released were not "essential, new and previously unknown".

=== Appeal and Decision of the European Court of Human Rights ===
Halet decided to refer his case to the European Court of Human Rights (ECHR) in order to get the recognition that he also acted as a whistleblower. In May 2021, a chamber of the ECHR rejected Halet's appeal.

In February 2023, the Grand Chamber of the ECHR ruled that Halet's conviction violated Article 10 of the European Convention of Human Rights. The ruling required Luxembourg to pay Halet €55,000 plus court costs.

== See also ==
- Global Integrity
- Offshore financial centre
- Offshore Leaks, 2013
- Swiss Leaks, 2014
- Panama Papers, 2016
- Football Leaks
- Paradise Papers, 2017
- Pandora Papers, 2021
- Suisse Secrets, 2022
- Tax haven
- Whistleblower
