= Marius Kohl =

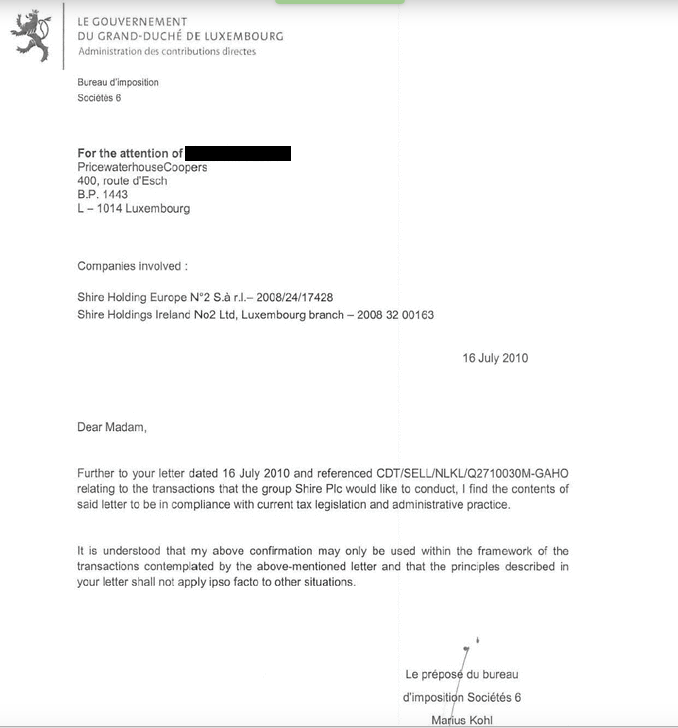
A leaked tax ruling signed by Marius Kohl

Marius Kohl (born 16 September 1953) is the former chief of the Luxembourg tax agency Sociétés 6. During his 22-year tenure, he was solely responsible for approving thousands of tax arrangements for foreign companies investing capital in Luxembourg. He retired in 2013. Kohl was known by the nickname "Monsieur Ruling" and has been credited with helping to secure €1.2 billion in annual tax revenue for Luxembourg.

== Luxembourg Leaks ==
The tax rulings released in the Luxembourg Leaks were sought by PricewaterhouseCoopers and approved by Kohl.
