= Bruno Ossébi =

Franco-Congolese journalist

Bruno Jacquet Ossébi
- Born: Bruno Jacquet; December 10, 1964; France
- Died: February 2, 2009 (Age: 44 years); Brazzaville, Republic of Congo
- Cause of death: Murder / Arson
- Citizenship: French
- Occupation: Journalist
- Years active: Early 1990s–February 2009
- Employer: Mwinda

Bruno Jacquet Ossébi (December 10, 1964 – February 2, 2009), also known as Bruno Jacquet or Ossébi, was a Franco-Congolese journalist for the online news site Mwinda. Ossébi was working to expose government corruption when a mysterious fire broke out in his home. He sustained fatal injuries, and died in a military hospital in Brazzaville, Republic of the Congo twelve days later.

== Personal ==
Bruno Ossébi was born in France, and originally given the name Bruno Jacquet. He was born on December 10, 1964, to a French father and a Congolese mother. He moved to the Republic of Congo in the early 1990s to pursue a career in blogging and journalism. He began writing for the Congolese web site Mwinda about hot-button political issues. Ossébi was thought to be protected as a French citizen; however, he received several threats throughout his career. Ossébi was not married, but lived with his girlfriend and her two children. They also died in the house fire that killed Ossébi.

== Career ==
Ossébi was an activist throughout his career. He wrote for Mwinda, and also created a personal blog (bruno-ossebi.novoblog.com). He began writing for Mwinda when President Denis Sassou-Nguesso came to power in the early 1990s. Ossébi sought to condemn the plundering of oil, timber, and violations of human rights in the Republic of Congo. He was also active in the StAR program of the World Bank, and active with the United Nations program that recovers misappropriated African assets. Ossébi spent two years working with lawyers, activists, and citizens to develop a court complaint against President Sassou Nguesso, President of Gabon Omar Bongo, and President of Equatorial Guinea Teodoro Obiang, accusing them of "misappropriation of public funds".

== Death ==
Location of the place where he were killed in relation to the capital Brazzaville.

On January 21, 2009, two fires broke out 6,000 km away from each other in two different Franco-Congolese journalist's homes. Bruno Ossébi in Brazzaville, Republic of Congo, and Benjamin Toungamani in France. Both journalists, Ossébi included, were plaintiff's in an “ill-gotten gains” complaint filed weeks before. Ossébi and Toungamani both heavily criticized Denis Sassou Nguesso’s authoritarianism, and his lavish lifestyle at the expense of the Congolese people. Ossébi was able to escape the home, but died in a military hospital twelve days later.

There was no serious investigation or autopsy after the fires, according to Reporters Without Borders. Bruno Ossébi’s official cause of death was “cardiac arrest”, and no mention of burns were notated, even though 30% of his body was covered.

== Context ==
Three days before the fire broke out in Bruno Ossébi's home, he published an article on Mwinda press. The article revealed that Société Nationale des Pétroles du Congo, a petroleum company led by President Denis Sassou-Nguesso's son, Denis-Christel Sassou Nguesso, was seeking a French bank loan of $100 million pledged to the production of oil. Ossébi accused them of organizing a “debt front” which contradicted a commitment made by the Congo to the International Monetary Fund. Two days before the incident, Ossébi contacted the committee to recover stolen property from the World Bank. A few weeks earlier, he had indicated his intention to join a complaint against “ill-gotten gains”.

== Impact ==
Following Ossébi's death, Reporters Without Borders have accused officials of minimizing the case, and failing to carry out an official investigation or autopsy. Reporters Without Borders have since launched their own investigation into the case. More than 80 people have been interviewed including relatives, friends, other journalists, and government officials, but no further action has been taken. Reporters Without Borders continues to ask the French government for aid in solving the case.

== Reactions ==
Koïchiro Matsuura, director-general of UNESCO, said, "I deplore the death of Bruno Ossébi. I trust that the authorities will spare no effort in seeking to elucidate this tragedy as soon as possible. It is important to remember that the work of journalists is essential not only if we are to uphold the basic human right of freedom of expression but for democracy and good governance, issues that concern societies everywhere.”

Jean-François Julliard, former secretary-general of Reporters Without Borders, said, "Deploring the negligence of the investigation conducted in Brazzaville by the Congolese authorities, we asked the French government, six months after the death of Bruno Ossébi, to open an investigation in France." He adds, "Today, it is still unclear whether the fire in the journalist's home was accidental or criminal. We still do not know why Bruno Ossébi died suddenly, twelve days later, with his state of health. We are astonished that France has remained passive on the mysterious death of one of its nationals, recognized, moreover, as a very critical voice in a country that does not shine by its respect for the Freedom of the press."

== See also ==
- Human rights in the Republic of the Congo
