= Advance tax ruling =

An advance tax ruling is a tool for multinational corporations and for individual taxfilers for clarifying and conforming particular taxation arrangements.

A written interpretation of tax laws is issued by tax authorities to corporations and individuals who request clarification of taxation arrangements.

== Overview ==
An advance tax ruling binds tax authorities to comply with the tax arrangements set out in the ruling. Advance tax rulings are common in numerous countries.

The Luxembourg Leaks provide insight into the practice of advance tax rulings in Luxembourg used by corporations as a tool for devising strategies that help them avoid taxes.

== See also ==
- Private letter ruling
- Annual flat-rate tax
- Advance pricing agreement
