= Léon Mébiame =

Gabonese politician (1934–2015)

2nd Prime Minister of Gabon
- In office 16 April 1975 – 3 May 1990
- President: Omar Bongo
- Preceded by: Léon M'ba
- Succeeded by: Casimir Oyé-Mba

Personal details
- Born: 1 September 1934 Libreville, French Equatorial Africa (present day Gabon)
- Died: 18 December 2015 (aged 81) Libreville, Gabon
- Party: PDG

Léon Mébiame (1 September 1934 – 18 December 2015) was a Gabonese politician who was the 2nd Prime Minister of Gabon. From 1975 to 1990, he served as the longest-serving prime minister in Gabonese history, at 15 years and 17 days.

== Life and career ==
A member of the Fang ethnic group, Mébiame was born in Libreville. Under French colonial rule, he became an inspector of federal police in 1956 and was posted in Chad from 6 January 1957 to March 1959. At independence in 1960, he was commissioner of police. A close associate of President Omar Bongo, he was Vice President of Gabon from 1968 to 1975, when the position was abolished. He was Minister of Justice in early 1970s. He was appointed as prime minister and served from 16 April 1975 to 3 May 1990. He was the minister of public finance from 1990 to 1991. His replacement in the cabinet was seen as surprising as he was generally believed to be an anchor for stabilizing the ruling government's coalition, but Bongo was encouraged by reformist elements with the PDG including his own son to drop longtime ministers who opposed changes or who they deemed as having little competence. Mébiame was replaced by technocrat Casimir Oyé-Mba.

Subsequently, he joined the opposition in the early 1990s.

He was appointed as President of the Libreville Chamber of Commerce, Industry, and Mines on 6 November 2008. He took office on 4 December 2008, succeeding Joachim Boussamba. He was also appointed to the Economic and Social Council, an official advisory body, by President Bongo in 2008, although he lost his seat on the council after Bongo's son Ali Bongo Ondimba took office in 2009.

Mébiame died at age 81 at a Libreville clinic on the night of 17–18 December 2015.

Preceded by Omar Bongo	Vice President of Gabon; 1968-1975	Succeeded by Position abolished
Preceded by Leon M'Ba	Prime Minister of Gabon; 1975-1990	Succeeded by Casimir Oye-Mba
