= Omar Bongo =

President of Gabon from 1967 to 2009

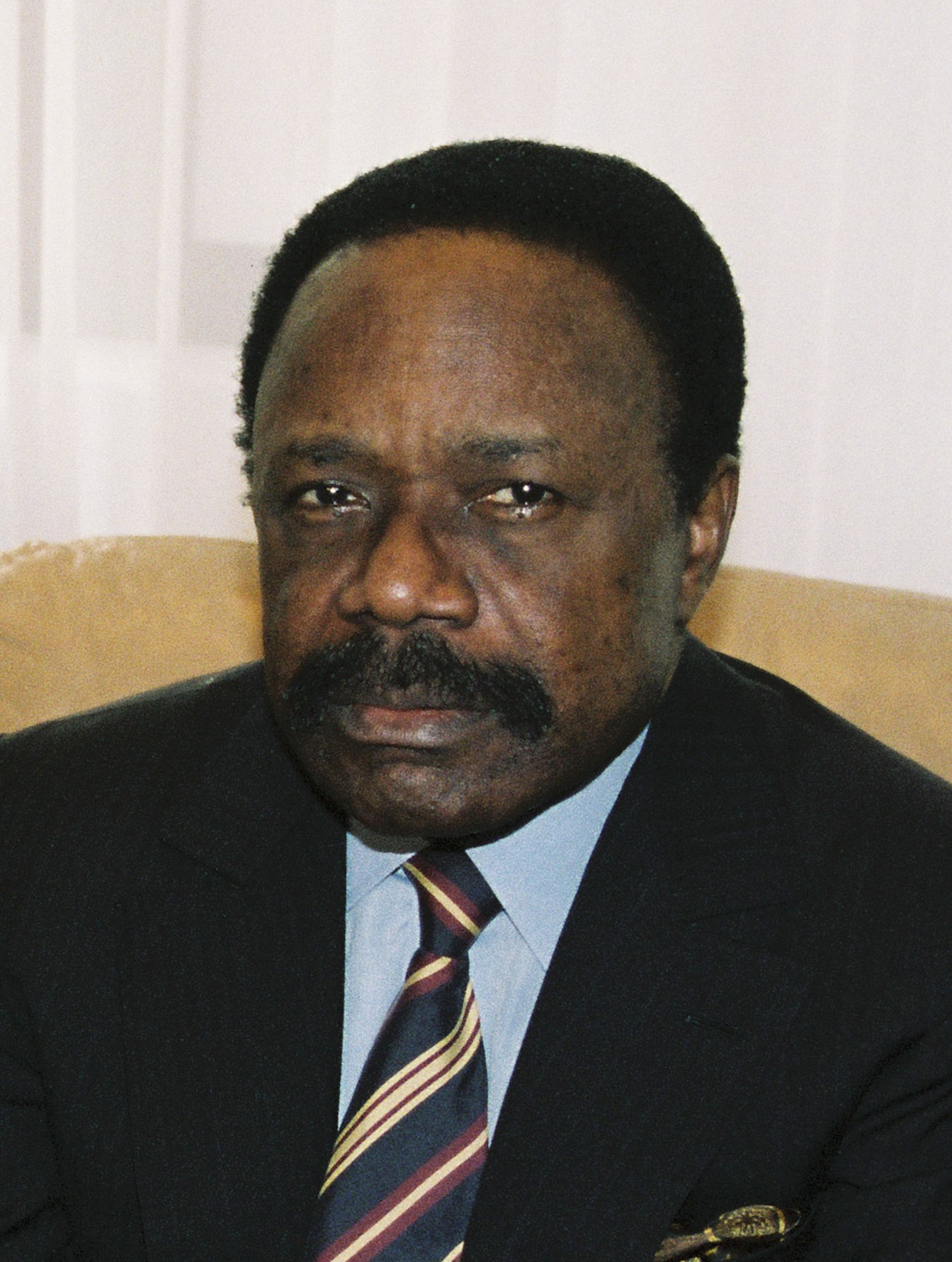
- Bongo in 1993

2nd President of Gabon
- In office 28 November 1967 – 8 June 2009^{[a]}^{[b]}
- Prime Minister: See list: Léon Mébiame; Casimir Oyé-Mba; Paulin Obame-Nguema; Jean-François Ntoutoume Emane; Jean Eyeghe Ndong
- Vice President: See list: Himself (Nov–Dec 1967); Léon Mébiame (1968–1975); Didjob Divungi Di Ndinge (1997–2009)
- Preceded by: Léon M'ba
- Succeeded by: Didjob Divungi Di Ndinge (acting); Ali Bongo

2nd Vice President of Gabon
- In office 12 November 1966 – 2 December 1967
- President: Léon M'ba; Himself (acting)
- Preceded by: Paul-Marie Yembit
- Succeeded by: Léon Mébiame

Minister of Information and Tourism
- In office August 1966 – 12 November 1966
- President: Léon M'ba

Personal details
- Born: Albert-Bernard Bongo; 30 December 1935 Lewai, then part of French Equatorial Africa
- Died: 8 June 2009 (aged 73) Barcelona, Spain
- Party: PDG
- Spouses: Louise Mouyabi Moukala (m. 1957–1959); Patience Dabany (m. 1959; div. 1987); Edith Lucie Sassou Nguesso (m. 1989; died 2009)
- Children: 30+ (by various partners), including Ali

Military service
- Allegiance: France (before 1968); Gabon (after 1968)
- Branch/service: French Air Force
- Rank: Captain
- a. Acting: 28 November – 2 December 1967; b. Suspended: 6 May – 8 June 2009

Omar Bongo Ondimba (born Albert-Bernard Bongo; 30 December 1935 – 8 June 2009) was the second president of Gabon, serving from 1967 until his death in 2009. A member of the Gabonese Democratic Party (PDG), Bongo was promoted to key positions as a young official under Gabon's first president Léon M'ba in the 1960s, before being made the second vice president in 1966, replacing Paul-Marie Yembit. In 1967, after M'ba's death, he became the country's president.

Bongo headed the single-party regime of the PDG until 1990, when, faced with public pressure, he was forced to introduce multi-party politics into Gabon. His political survival despite intense opposition to his rule in the early 1990s seemed to stem once again from consolidating power by bringing most of the major opposition leaders at the time to his side. The 1993 presidential election was extremely controversial but ended with his re-election then and the subsequent elections of 1998 and 2005. His respective parliamentary majorities increased and the opposition became more subdued with each succeeding election. After Cuban leader Fidel Castro stepped down in February 2008, Bongo became the world's longest-ruling non-royal leader, retaining this distinction until his death the following year.

Bongo's government received strong diplomatic, financial and military backing from its former coloniser France (tied to the presence of French oil giant Elf and subsequently Total in the country). He was criticised for in effect having worked for himself, his family and local elites and not for Gabon and its people despite an oil-led GDP per capita growth to one of the highest levels in Africa. Press freedom was curtailed by the regime, which typically banned news outlets critical of Bongo or his entourage. He is also suspected to have been involved in assassinations including those of Ndouna Dépénaud, Joseph Rendjambé and (in France) Robert Luong. After Bongo's death in June 2009, his son Ali Bongo, who had long been assigned key ministerial responsibilities by his father, was elected to succeed him in August of that year, serving until he was overthrown by his cousin in 2023.

== Early life ==
The youngest of twelve siblings, Bongo was born Albert-Bernard Bongo on 30 December 1935 in Lewai (since renamed Bongoville), French Equatorial Africa, a town of the Haut-Ogooué province in what is now southeastern Gabon near the border with the Republic of the Congo. He was a member of the small Bateke ethnic group. After completing his primary and secondary education in Brazzaville (then the capital of French Equatorial Africa), Bongo held a job at the Post and Telecommunications Public Services, before joining the French military where he served as a second lieutenant and then as a first lieutenant in the Air Force, in Brazzaville, Bangui and Fort Lamy (present-day N'djamena, Chad) successively, before being honourably discharged as captain.

== Early political career ==
Bongo began his political career after Gabon's independence in 1960, rapidly rising through a succession of positions under President Léon M'ba. Bongo campaigned for M. Sandoungout in Haut Ogooué in the 1961 parliamentary election, choosing not to run for election in his own right; Sandoungout was elected and became Minister of Health. Bongo worked at the Ministry of Foreign Affairs for a time, and he was named assistant director of the Presidential Cabinet in March 1962; he was named Director seven months later. In 1964, during the only coup attempt in 20th-century Gabon, M'ba was kidnapped and Bongo was held in a military camp in Libreville, though M'ba was restored to power two days later.

On 24 September 1965, he was appointed as Presidential Representative and placed in charge of defence and coordination. He was then appointed Minister of Information and Tourism, initially on an interim basis, then formally holding the position in August 1966. M'ba, whose health was declining, appointed Bongo as Vice-President of Gabon on 12 November 1966. In the presidential election held on 19 March 1967, M'ba was re-elected as President and Bongo was elected as vice-president during the same election. Bongo was in effective control of Gabon since November 1966 during M'ba's long illness.

== Presidency (1967–2009) ==
=== Single-party rule (1967–1990) ===
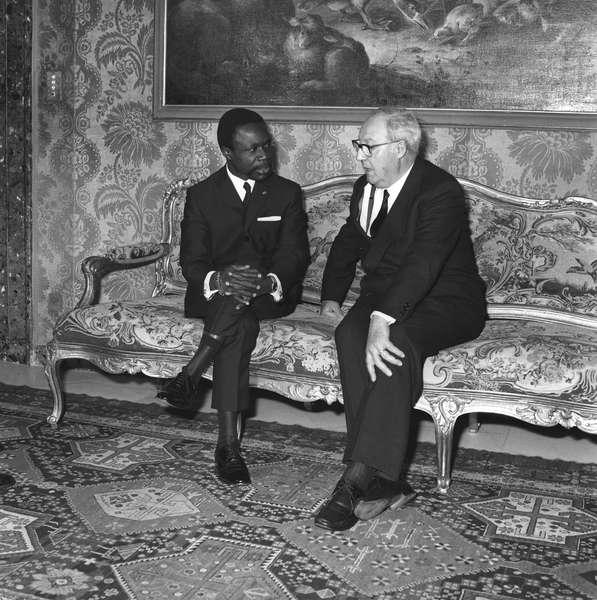
Bongo with Italian president Giuseppe Saragat in 1968

Bongo became president on 2 December 1967, following the death of M'ba four days earlier, and was installed by de Gaulle and influential French leaders. Aged 32, Bongo was Africa's fourth youngest president at the time, after captain Michel Micombero of Burundi and sergeant Gnassingbé Eyadéma of Togo. In March 1968 Bongo decreed Gabon to be a one-party state and changed the name of the Gabonese Independence Party, the Bloc Démocratique Gabonais (BDG), to the Parti Démocratique Gabonais (PDG).

The 1973 general election set the tone for all elections held in the country for the next two decades. Bongo was the sole candidate for president. He and a single list of PDG candidates were elected by 99.56% of the votes cast. In April 1975 Bongo abolished the post of vice-president and appointed his former vice-president, Léon Mébiame, as prime minister, a position Bongo had held concurrently with his presidency from 1967. Mebiame would remain as prime minister until his resignation in 1990.

In addition to the presidency, Bongo held several ministerial portfolios from 1967 onward, including Minister of National Defense (1965–1981), Information (1967–1980), Planning (1967–1977), Prime Minister (1967–1975), the Interior (1967–1970), and many others. Following a Congress of the PDG in January 1979 and the December 1979 elections, Bongo gave up some of his ministerial portfolios and surrendered his functions as head of government to Prime Minister Mebiame. The PDG congress had criticized Bongo's administration for inefficiency and called for an end to the holding of multiple offices. Bongo was again re-elected for a seven-year term in 1979, receiving 99.96% of the popular vote. In the autumn of that same year, Robert Luong, a lover of Bongo's wife, was assassinated by barbouze mercenaries in Villeneuve-sur-Lot, France.

Opposition to President Bongo's regime first appeared in the late 1970s, as economic difficulties became more acute for the Gabonese. The first organized, but illegal, opposition party was the Movement for National Restoration (Mouvement de redressement national, MORENA). This moderate opposition group sponsored demonstrations by students and academic staff at the Université Omar Bongo in Libreville in December 1981, when the university was temporarily closed. MORENA accused Bongo of corruption and personal extravagance and of favouring his own Bateke tribe; the group demanded that a multi-party system be restored. Arrests were made in February 1982, when the opposition distributed leaflets criticizing the Bongo regime during a visit by Pope John Paul II. In November 1982, 37 MORENA members were tried and convicted of offences against state security. Severe sentences were handed out, including 20 years of hard labour for 13 of the defendants; all were pardoned, however, and released by mid-1986.

Despite these pressures, Omar Bongo remained committed to one-party rule. In 1985, legislative elections were held which followed past procedures; all nominations were approved by PDG, which then presented a single list of candidates. The candidates were ratified by popular vote on 3 March 1985. In November 1986 Bongo was re-elected by 99.97% of the popular vote.

=== Multi-party rule (1990–2009) ===
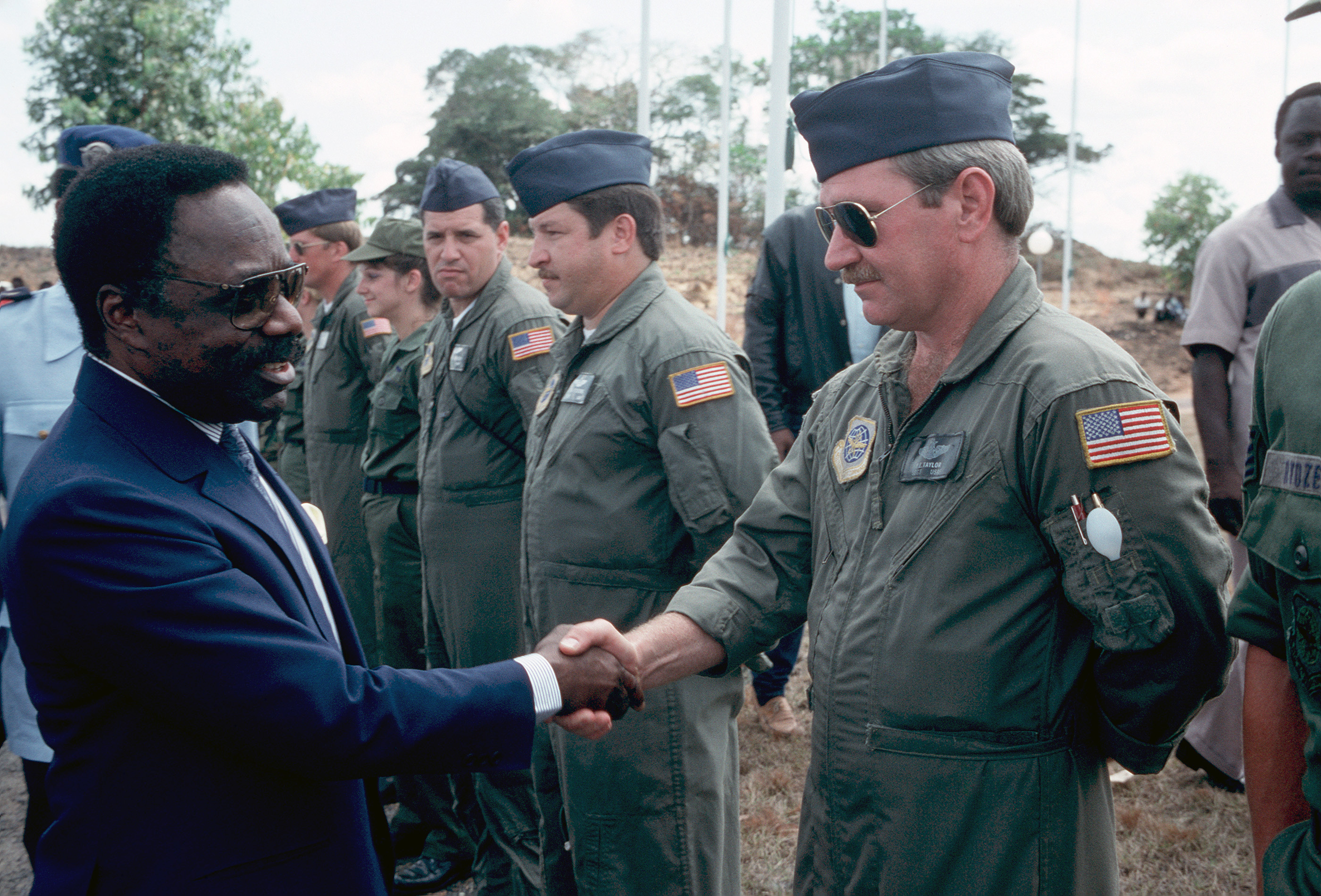
Bongo meeting American military personnel who provided medical assistance and training to local citizens, 1988

On 22 May 1990, after strikes, riots and unrest, the PDG central committee and the National Assembly approved constitutional amendments to facilitate the transition to a multi-party system. The existing presidential mandate, effective through 1994, was to be respected. Subsequent elections to the presidency would be contested by more than one candidate, and the presidential term of office was changed to five years with a term limit consisting of one re-election to the office.

The next day, 23 May 1990, a vocal critic of Bongo and the leading political opposition leader, Joseph Rendjambe, was found dead in a hotel, reportedly murdered by poison. The death of Rendjambe, a prominent business executive and secretary-general of the opposition group Parti gabonais du progres (PGP), touched off the worst rioting in Bongo's 23-year rule. Presidential buildings in Libreville were set on fire and the French consul-general and ten oil company employees were taken hostage. French troops evacuated foreigners and a state of emergency was declared in Port Gentil, Rendjambe's hometown and a strategic oil production site. During this emergency Gabon's two main oil producers, Elf and Shell, cut output from 270,000 barrels per day (43,000 m^{3}/d) to 20,000. Bongo threatened to withdraw their exploration licences unless they restored normal output, which they soon did. Under the moniker Opération Requin, France sent in 500 troops (1,200 according to other sources) to reinforce the 500-man battalion of Marines permanently stationed in Gabon "to protect the interests of 20,000 resident French nationals". Tanks and troops were deployed around the presidential palace to halt rioters.

In December 1993, Bongo won the first presidential election held under the new multi-party constitution, by a considerably narrower margin of around 51.4%. Opposition candidates refused to validate the election results. Serious civil disturbances led to an agreement between the government and opposition factions to work toward a political settlement. These talks led to the Paris Accords in November 1994, under which several opposition figures were included in a government of national unity. This arrangement soon broke down, however, and the 1996 and 1997 legislative and municipal elections provided the backdrop for renewed partisan politics. The PDG won a landslide victory in the legislative election, but several major cities, including Libreville, elected opposition mayors during the 1997 local election. Bongo was eventually successful in consolidating power again, with most of the major opposition leaders being either co-opted by being given high-ranking posts in the government or bought off, ensuring his comfortable re-election in 1998.

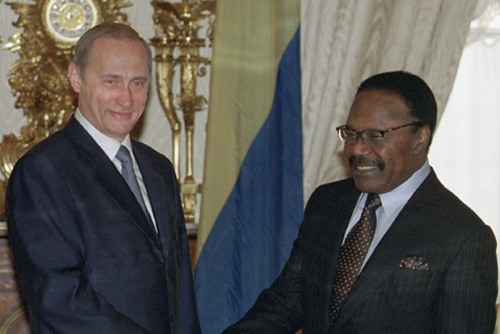
Bongo with Russian president Vladimir Putin in Moscow whilst on a state visit in 2001.

In 2003, Bongo secured a constitutional amendment removing presidential term limits and increasing the presidential term length to seven years from five. His critics accused him of intending to rule for life. Bongo was re-elected on 27 November 2005, receiving 79.2 percent of the vote, comfortably ahead of his four challengers. He was sworn in for a seven-year term on 19 January 2006.

=== Relations with France ===
French culture, economy, and polity have long dominated the small African country of Gabon. The French control of the colonial era ... has been replaced, since independence in 1960, by an insidious rapprochement with Paris, fashioned by Gabon's leadership. A French journalist long familiar with the continent wrote that 'Gabon is an extreme case, verging on caricature, of neocolonialism'.

— Reed, 1987

Bongo's international relations and affairs were dominated by his, and by extension Gabon's, relations with France, Gabon falling within the ambit of the French sphere of influence in Africa known as Françafrique. With its oil, a fifth of the world's known uranium (Gabonese uranium supplied France's nuclear bombs, which President Charles de Gaulle tested in the Algerian deserts in 1960), big iron and manganese deposits, and plenty of timber, Gabon was always important to France. Bongo reportedly said: "Gabon without France is like a car with no driver. France without Gabon is like a car with no fuel..." Relations between France and Gabon were mainly fostered through the informal networks of Jacques Foccart, the oil company Elf, the diplomat Maurice Delauney, the SDECE officer Maurice Robert and the leader of the SAC militia Pierre Debizet. Nicholas Shaxson, a political analyst on African petrostates, noted that Bongo had profited from Gabon's status as "a source of offshore slush funds" to secretly finance French political parties and bribe in favour of French commercial bids.

In 1964, when renegade soldiers arrested him in Libreville and kidnapped president M'ba, French paratroopers rescued the abducted president and Bongo, restoring them to power. Bongo became vice president in 1966 after what was effectively an interview and subsequent approval by de Gaulle in 1965 in Paris.

In 1988, The New York Times reported that "Last year, French aid to Gabon amounted to US$360 million. This included subsidizing a third of Gabon's budget, extending low-interest trade loans, paying the salaries of 170 French advisers and 350 French teachers and paying scholarships for most of the roughly 800 Gabonese who study in France every year... [A]ccording to Le Canard enchaîné, a French opposition weekly, US$2.6 million of this aid also went for the interior decoration of a DC-8 jet belonging to President Bongo."

In 1990, France, which has always maintained a permanent military base in Gabon as well as in some of its other ex-colonies, helped maintain Bongo in power in the face of sustained pro-democracy protests that threatened to oust him from power through its Opération Requin. When Gabon found itself on the brink of a civil war after the first multiparty presidential elections in 1993, with the opposition staging violent protests, Paris hosted the talks between Bongo and the opposition, resulting in the Paris Agreement/Accords which restored calm.

In France, his old ally, Mr. Bongo and his family lived in the rarefied air of the super-rich. At their disposal were 39 luxurious properties, 70 bank accounts and at least 9 luxury vehicles worth about US$2 million, according to Transparency International....

French president Valéry Giscard d'Estaing claimed that Bongo helped bankroll Jacques Chirac's campaign in the 1981 presidential election. Giscard said Bongo had developed a "very questionable financial network" over time. "I called Bongo and told him 'you're supporting my rival's campaign' and there was a dead silence that I still remember to this day and then he said 'Ah, you know about it', which was extraordinary. From that moment on, I broke off personal relations with him", said Giscard. Socialist parliamentarian André Vallini reportedly claimed that Bongo had bankrolled numerous French electoral campaigns, on both the right and the left. In 2008, President Nicolas Sarkozy demoted his minister in charge of looking after the ex-colonies, Jean-Marie Bockel, after the latter noted the "squandering of public funds" by some African regimes, provoking Bongo's fury. Following Bongo's death, Sarkozy expressed his "sadness and emotion" and pledged that France would remain "loyal to its long relationship of friendship" with Gabon. In a statement, he described Bongo as "a great and loyal friend of France who has left us — a grand figure of Africa".

=== Allegations of corruption ===
Italian fashion designer Francesco Smalto admitted providing Bongo with Parisian prostitutes to secure a tailoring business worth $600,000 per year.

Bongo was one of the wealthiest heads of state in the world, his wealth attributed primarily to oil revenue and alleged corruption. In 1999, an investigation by the US Senate Permanent Subcommittee on investigations into Citibank estimated that the Gabonese President held US$130 million in the bank's personal accounts, money the Senate report said was "sourced in the public finances of Gabon".

In 2005, an investigation by the United States Senate Indian Affairs Committee into fundraising irregularities by lobbyist Jack Abramoff revealed that Abramoff had offered to arrange a meeting between U.S. president George W. Bush and Bongo for the sum of US$9,000,000. Although such an exchange of funds remains unproven, Bush met with Bongo 10 months later in the Oval Office.

In 2007, his former daughter-in-law, Inge Lynn Collins Bongo, the second wife of his son Ali Bongo, caused a stir when she appeared on the US music channel VH1's reality show Really Rich Real Estate. She was featured as a contestant looking to buy a US$25,000,000 mansion in Malibu, California.

Bongo was cited in recent years during French criminal inquiries into hundreds of millions of euros of illicit payments by Elf Aquitaine, the former French state-owned oil group. One Elf representative testified that the company was giving 50 million euros per year to Bongo to exploit the oil fields of Gabon. As of June 2007, Bongo, along with President Denis Sassou Nguesso of the Republic of the Congo, Blaise Compaoré of Burkina Faso, Teodoro Obiang Nguema Mbasogo of Equatorial Guinea and José Eduardo dos Santos from Angola was being investigated by the French magistrates after the complaint made by French NGOs Survie and Sherpa due to claims that he has used millions of pounds of embezzled public funds to acquire lavish properties in France. The leaders all denied wrongdoing.

The Sunday Times (UK) reported on 20 June 2008 as follows:

A mansion worth £15m in one of Paris's most elegant districts has become the latest of 33 luxury properties bought in France by President Omar Bongo Ondimba of Gabon ... a French judicial investigation has discovered that Bongo, 72, and his relatives also bought a fleet of limousines, including a £308,823 Maybach for his wife, Edith, 44. Payment for some of the cars was taken directly from the treasury of Gabon ... The Paris mansion is in the Rue de la Baume, near the Elysée Palace ... The 21,528 sq ft (2,000.0 m^{2}) home was bought in June last year by a property company based in Luxembourg. The firm's partners are two of Bongo's children, Omar, 13, and Yacine, 16, his wife Edith and one of her nephews... [T]he residence is the most expensive in his portfolio, which includes nine other properties in Paris, four of which are on the exclusive Avenue Foch, near the Arc de Triomphe. He also rents a nine-room apartment in the same street. Bongo has a further seven properties in Nice, including four villas, one of which has a swimming pool. Edith has two flats near the Eiffel Tower and another property in Nice. Investigators identified the properties through tax records. Checks at Bongo's houses, in turn, allowed them to find details of his fleet of cars. Edith used a cheque, drawn on an account in the name of "Prairie du Gabon en France" (part of the Gabon treasury), to buy the Maybach, painted Côte d'Azur blue, in February 2004. Bongo's daughter Pascaline, 52, used a cheque from the same account for a part-payment of £29,497 towards a £60,000 Mercedes two years later. Bongo bought himself a Ferrari 612 Scaglietti F1 in October 2004 for £153,000 while his son Ali acquired a Ferrari 456 M GT in June 2001 for £156,000. Bongo's fortune has repeatedly come under the spotlight. According to a 1997 US Senate report, his family spends £55m a year. In a separate French investigation into corruption at the former oil giant Elf Aquitaine, an executive testified that it paid Bongo £40m a year via Swiss bank accounts in exchange for permission to exploit his country's reserves. Bongo denied this. The latest inquiry, by the French antifraud agency OCRGDF, followed a lawsuit that accused Bongo and two other African leaders of looting public funds to finance their purchases. 'Whatever the merits and qualifications of these leaders, no one can seriously believe that these assets were paid for out of their salaries', alleges the lawsuit brought by the Sherpa association of judges, which promotes corporate social responsibility.

In 2009, Bongo spent his last months in a major row with France over the French inquiry. A French court decision in February 2009 to freeze his bank accounts added fuel to the fire and his government accused France of waging a "campaign to destabilize" the country.

In the aftermath of the 2007 complaint by Sherpa and Survie, parts of the Bongo family's real estate and other assets have been seized in France through biens mal acquis rulings.

=== Leadership style ===
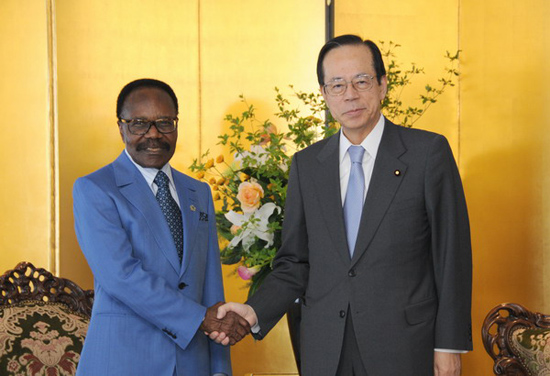
Bongo with Prime Minister of Japan Yasuo Fukuda, 2008

Bongo was described as "a diminutive, dapper figure who conversed in flawless French, a charismatic figure surrounded by a personality cult", and among the last African "big man" rulers. The pillars of his long rule were France, Gabon's former colonial power; revenues from Gabon's 2,500,000,000 barrels (400,000,000 m^{3}) of oil reserves; and his political skills.

An ardent Francophile, at the inception of his presidency Bongo was happy to strike a favourable bargain with France. He gave the French oil company, Elf Aquitaine, privileged rights to exploit Gabon's oil reserves while the French political establishment returned the favour by guaranteeing his grip on power for the indefinite future.

Bongo went on to preside over an oil boom that undoubtedly fuelled an extravagant lifestyle for him and his family—dozens of luxurious properties in and around France, a US$800 million presidential palace in Gabon, fancy cars, etc. This enabled him to amass enough wealth to become one of the world's richest men. He carefully allowed just enough oil money to trickle down to the general population of 1.4 million, thus avoiding mass unrest. He built some basic infrastructure in Libreville and, ignoring advice to establish a road network instead, constructed the US$4 billion Trans-Gabon Railway line deep into the forested interior. Petrodollars funded the salaries of a bloated civil service, spreading enough of the state's wealth among the population to keep most of them fed and dressed. A 2008 article by The Guardian recounted Gabonese life under Bongo:

Gabon produces some sugar, beer and bottled water. Despite the rich soil and tropical climate, there is only a tiny amount of agricultural production. Fruit and vegetables arrive on trucks from Cameroon. Milk is flown in from France. And years of dependence on relatives with civil service jobs means that many Gabonese have no interest in seeking work outside the state sector – most manual jobs are taken by immigrants.

Bongo used part of the money to build up a fairly large circle of people who supported him such as government ministers, high administrators, and army officers. He had learned from M'ba how to give government ministries to different tribal groups so that someone from every important group had a representative in the government. Bongo had no ideology beyond self-interest, but there was no opposition with an ideology either. He ruled by knowing how the self-interest of others could be manipulated. He was skilled at persuading opposition figures to become his allies. He offered critics modest slices of the nation's oil wealth, co-opting or buying off opponents rather than crushing them outright. He became the most successful of all Africa's Francophone leaders, comfortably extending his political dominance into the fifth decade.

When multi-party presidential elections were held in 1993, which he won, the poll was marred by allegations of rigging, with the opposition claiming that chief rival, Father Paul Mba Abessole, was robbed of victory. Gabon found itself on the brink of a civil war, as the opposition staged violent demonstrations. Determined to prove that he was not a dictator who relied on brute force for his political survival, Bongo entered into talks with the opposition, negotiating what became known as the Paris Agreement. When Bongo won the second presidential elections held in 1998, similar controversy raged over his victory. The president responded by meeting some of his critics to discuss revising legislation to guarantee free and fair elections. After Bongo's Gabonese Democratic Party scored a landslide victory in the 2001 legislative elections, Bongo offered government posts to influential opposition members. Father Abessole accepted a ministerial post in the name of "friendly democracy".

The main opposition leader, Pierre Mamboundou of the Gabonese People's Union, refused to attend the post 1998 elections meetings, claiming that they were merely a ploy by Bongo to lure opposition leaders. Mamboundou called for a boycott of the legislative elections held in December 2001, and his supporters burned ballot boxes and papers in a polling station in his hometown of Ndende. He then rejected offers for a senior post after the 2001 legislative elections. But despite threats from Bongo, Mamboundou was never arrested. The president declared that a "policy of forgiveness" was his "best revenge". "In 2006, however, Maboundou, stopped his public criticisms of Mr. Bongo. The former brand made no secret that the president pledged to give him US$21.5 million for the development of his constituency of Ndende". As time went on, Bongo increasingly relied on his close family members. By 2009, his son Ali by his first wife had been the Minister of Defence since 1999, while his daughter, Pascaline, was the head of the president's administration and her husband, Paul Toungui, was the Minister of Foreign Affairs.

In 2000, he put an end to a student strike by providing about US$1.35 million for the purchase of the computers and books they were demanding. "[He] was a self-proclaimed nature lover in a country with the largest percentage of the untrammelled virgin jungle of all the nations in the Congo Basin. In 2002, he set aside 10 percent of Gabon's land as national parks, pledging that they would never be logged, mined, hunted or farmed." He was not beyond some measure of self-aggrandisement, "thus, Gabon acquired Bongo University, Bongo Airport, numerous Bongo Hospitals, Bongo Stadium and Bongo Gymnasium. The president's hometown, Lewai, was inevitably renamed Bongoville."

On the international stage, Bongo cultivated an image as a mediator, playing a pivotal role in attempts to solve the crises in the Central African Republic, Republic of the Congo, Burundi and the Democratic Republic of Congo. In 1986, Bongo's image was boosted abroad when he received the Dag Hammarskjöld Peace Prize for efforts to resolve the Chad-Libya border conflict. He was popular among his own people as his reign had guaranteed peace and stability.

Under Mr. Bongo's rule, Gabon never had a coup or a civil war, a rare achievement for a nation surrounded by unstable, war-torn states. Fuelled by oil, the country's economy was more like that of an Arabian emirate than a Central African nation. For many years Gabon was said, perhaps apocryphally, to have the world's highest per capita consumption of Champagne.

According to the political scientist Thomas Atenga, despite the large oil revenues, "the Gabonese rentier state has functioned for years on the predation of resources for the benefit of its ruling class, around which a parasitic capitalism has developed that has hardly improved the living conditions of the population".

== Illness and death ==
On 7 May 2009, the Gabonese government announced that Bongo had temporarily suspended his official duties and taken time off to mourn his wife and rest in Spain. International media, however, reported that he was seriously ill, and undergoing treatment for cancer in a Barcelona hospital. The Gabonese government maintained that he was in Spain for a few days of rest following the "intense emotional shock" of his wife's death, but eventually admitted that he was in a Spanish clinic "undergoing a medical check-up".

On 7 June 2009, unconfirmed reports quoting French media and citing sources "close to the French government" reported that Bongo had died in Spain of complications from advanced cancer. The government of Gabon denied the reports, which had been picked up by numerous other news sources, and continued to insist that he was well. His death was eventually confirmed by Prime Minister Jean Eyeghe Ndong, who said in a written statement that Bongo had died of a heart attack shortly before 12:30 GMT on 8 June 2009.

Following Bongo's death, his body was flown back to Gabon, where it lay in state for five days, as thousands of people came to pay their respects. A state funeral followed on 16 June 2009 in Libreville which was attended by nearly two dozen African heads of state, including several of the continent's strongmen who themselves had ruled for decades, and by the French president Nicolas Sarkozy and his predecessor Jacques Chirac, who were the only Western heads of state to attend. Bongo's remains were then flown to Franceville, the main town in the southeastern province of Haut-Ogooue, where he was born, where he was buried in a private family burial on 18 June 2009.

== Personal life ==
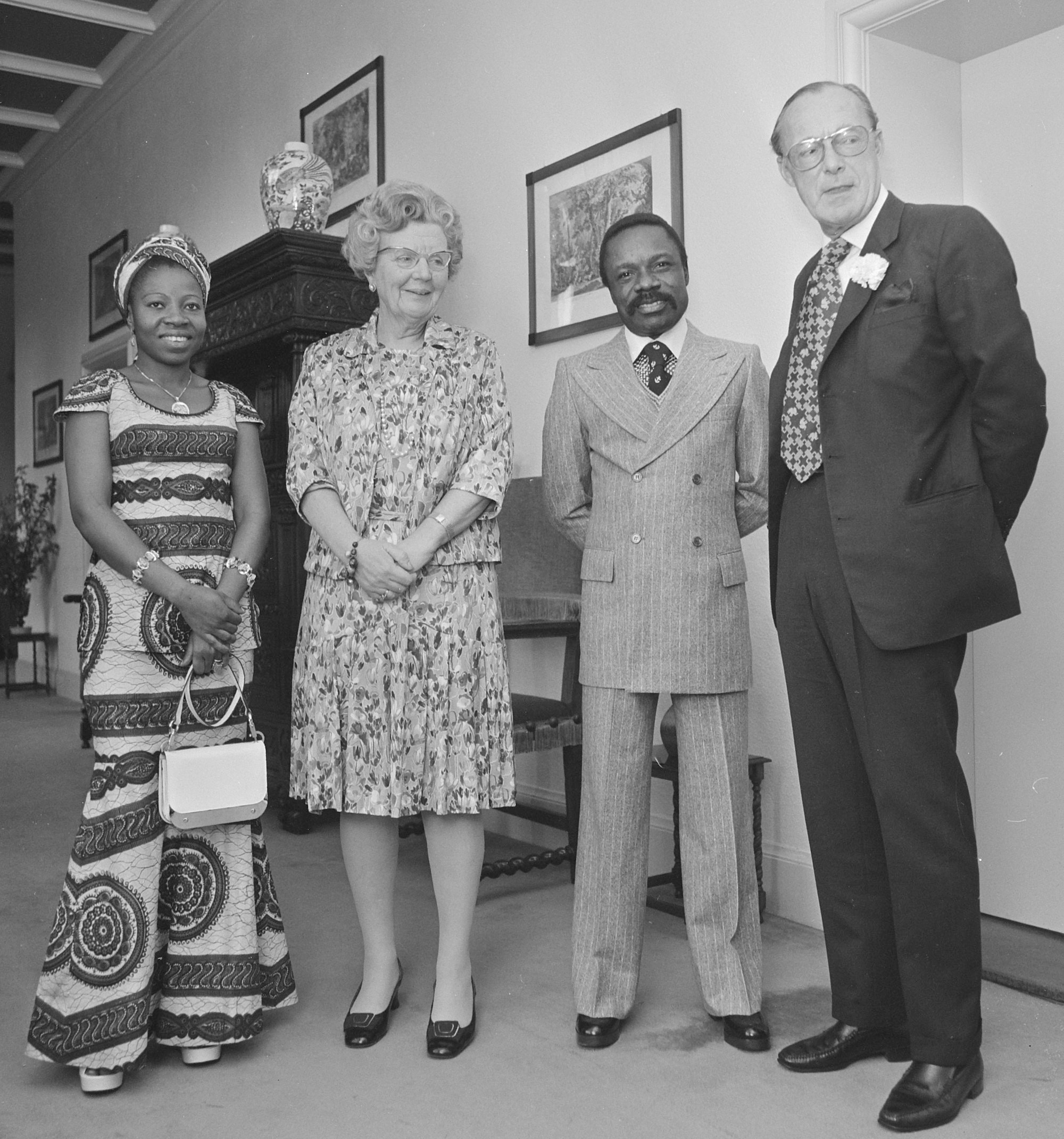
Bongo and Patience Dabany with Queen Juliana and Prince Bernhard of the Netherlands, 1973

Bongo converted to Islam and took the name El Hadj Omar Bongo while on a visit to Libya in 1973. At the time Muslims constituted a tiny minority of the native population; following Bongo's conversion the numbers grew, although they remained a small minority. He added Ondimba as a surname on 15 November 2003 in recognition of his father, Basile Ondimba, who died in 1942.

Bongo's first marriage was to Louise Mouyabi-Moukala. They had a daughter, Pascaline Bongo Ondimba, born at Franceville in 1957. Pascaline was Gabon's foreign minister and subsequently director of the presidential cabinet.

Bongo's second marriage was to Marie Joséphine Kama, later known as Joséphine Bongo. He divorced her in 1987, after which she went on to launch a music career under the name Patience Dabany. They had a son, Alain-Bernard (later Ali) Bongo, who was born in 1959 and served as foreign minister from 1989 to 1992, then as minister of national defense from 1999 to 2009, and was then elected president in August 2009 to replace his father; and a daughter, Albertine Amissa Bongo.

Bongo's third and final marriage was to Edith Lucie Sassou-Nguesso, nearly 30 years his junior and the daughter of Congolese president Denis Sassou Nguesso, in 1989. She was a trained pediatrician, known for her commitment to fighting AIDS, and bore Bongo two children. She died on 14 March 2009 in Rabat, Morocco, four days after her 45th birthday, after undergoing medical treatment for several months.

Bongo had a son, Fabrice Albert Andjoua Ondimba Bongo, with judge Marie-Madeleine Mborantsuo. The son was made director general of Gabon’s state budget department, during which time he acquired millions of dollars of properties in Dubai.

In all, Bongo had more than 30 children with his wives and other women.

Bongo did also have some measure of scandal. In 2004, The New York Times reported that:

Peru is investigating claims that a beauty pageant contestant was lured to Gabon to become the lover of its 67-year-old president, Omar Bongo, and was stranded for nearly two weeks after she refused. A spokesman for Mr. Bongo said he was unaware of the allegations. The Peruvian Foreign Ministry said that Ivette Santa Maria, a 22-year-old Miss Peru America contestant, was invited to Gabon to be a hostess for a pageant there. In an interview, Ms. Santa Maria said that she was taken to Mr. Bongo's presidential palace hours after her Jan. 19 arrival and that as he joined her, he pressed a button and some sliding doors opened, revealing a large bed. She said, I told him I was not a prostitute, that I was a Miss Peru. She fled and guards offered to drive her to a hotel. Without money to pay the bill, however, she was stranded in Gabon for 12 days until international women's groups and others intervened.

== Honours ==
=== National honours ===
- Gabon:
  - Grand Cross of the Order of the Equatorial Star
  - Grand Cross of the National Order of Merit

=== Foreign honours ===
- Angola:
  - Recipient of the Order of Agostinho Neto (1992)
- France:
  - Grand Cross of the National Order of Legion of Honour
- Italy:
  - Knight Grand Cross with Collar of the Order of Merit of the Italian Republic (1973)
- Philippines:
  - Grand Collar of the Order of Sikatuna
- Portugal:
  - Grand Collar of the Order of Prince Henry (2001)
- South Korea:
  - Grand Order of Mugunghwa (1975)
- United Kingdom:
  - Honorary Knight Grand Cross of the Order of St Michael and St George
- Yugoslavia:
  - Order of the Yugoslav Great Star

== In popular culture ==
Bongo was referenced in Robert Altman's 1983 offbeat comedy O.C. and Stiggs - in which the irreverent title characters, who admire Bongo, phone the seemingly amused Gabonese leader to recount their "utterly monstrous, mind-roasting summer."

In 1985, British politician Alan Clark, while Conservative Member of Parliament for Plymouth Sutton, once, in a departmental meeting, allegedly referred to Africa as "Bongo Bongo Land". When called to account, however, Clark denied the comment had any racist overtones, saying it had simply been a reference to then-incumbent President Omar Bongo.

Political offices
| Preceded by Léon M'ba | President of Gabon; 1967–2009 | Succeeded by Didjob Divungi Di Ndinge; Acting |
| Preceded by Paul-Marie Yembit | Vice President of Gabon; 1966–1967 | Succeeded by Léon Mébiame |
Diplomatic posts
| Preceded by Seewoosagur Ramgoolam | Chairperson of the Organisation of African Unity; 1977–1978 | Succeeded by Gaafar Nimeiry |
