= Annual flat-rate tax =

The Annual flat-rate tax (French: Imposition forfaitaire annuelle or IFA) was an annual flat-tax payable by French corporations liable for corporate tax. The tax was created by the Law 73-1150 of 27 December 1973, and repealed completely on January 1, 2014.

All legal entities that were liable for the corporate tax were also liable for the flat-rate tax except some newly established corporations (whose capital was composed of at least 50% of cash contributions) and certain not-for-profit organizations.

== History ==
Before 2006 the amount of IFA tax payable could be deducted against the corporate tax payable (or carried forward for 2 years).

The 2006 budget removed that possibility and instead the IFA became a deductible expense in the computation of the corporate tax.

The 2009 budget presented a plan to progressively repeal the IFA in three phases

1. On January 1, 2009, for corporations with revenues under 1.5 million euros.
2. On January 1, 2010, for corporations with revenues under 15 million euros.
3. On January 1, 2011, for all corporations.

== See also ==
- Taxation in France
- Corporation tax in France
