= Private letter ruling =

US taxpayer guidance

Private letter rulings (PLRs), in the United States, are written decisions by the Internal Revenue Service (IRS) in response to taxpayer requests for guidance. A letter ruling is "a written statement issued to a taxpayer by an Associate Chief Counsel Office of the Office of Chief Counsel or by the Tax Exempt and Government Entities Division that interprets and applies the tax laws to a specific set of facts."

A letter ruling binds both the IRS and the requesting taxpayer (in the event the matter is further disputed or litigated) but only those parties, so the ruling may not be relied on as precedent by other taxpayers. The IRS has the option, however, of redacting the personal content of a letter ruling and issuing that content as a revenue ruling, which may become binding on all taxpayers and the IRS.

PLRs from 1997 onwards are available to the public through the IRS Electronic reading room (see 26 U.S.C. § 6110).

== Similarity to technical advice memorandum ==
A technical advice memorandum (TAM) is similar to a letter ruling, but is typically obtained during the course of an IRS examination. A TAM is generally issued by an IRS Associate Chief Counsel Office to an IRS Division Commissioner, or to an IRS Appeals Area Director. A TAM is issued after a request for assistance arising during "any proceeding" before the IRS.

The request for advice must concern the interpretation and application of the internal revenue laws, tax treaties, regulations, revenue rulings, or other precedents to a specific set of facts to determine the correct tax treatment for an item in a year under audit or on appeal.

== See also ==
- Advance tax ruling
