= Common Consolidated Corporate Tax Base =

2011 European Union common tax scheme proposal

The Common Consolidated Corporate Tax Base (CCCTB) was a proposal for a common tax scheme for the European Union developed by the European Commission and first proposed in March 2011 that provides a single set of rules for how EU corporations calculate EU taxes, and provide the ability to consolidate EU taxes. Corporate tax rates in the EU would have not been changed by the CCCTB, as EU countries would continue to have their own corporate tax rates.

The original proposal stalled, largely due to objections from countries such as Ireland and the UK. In June 2015, the commission announced they will submit a relaunched CCCTB proposal in 2016, featuring two key changes compared to the initial proposal: First it would become mandatory (not voluntary) for corporations to apply the CCCTB regime, and second the "consolidation part" will be postponed for a later follow-up proposal.

In May 2021, the Commission expressed its intention to withdraw the CCCTB proposal, replacing it with a new framework for income taxation for businesses in Europe (Business in Europe: Framework for Income Taxation or BEFIT). However, the Commission work programme for 2022 published in November 2021 did not include the CCCTB as one of the withdrawn proposals. The proposal was finally withdrawn in september of 2023 and replaced with a proposal for a council directive establishing a Framework for Income Taxation.

== Concept ==
The concept of CCCTB requires all EU Member States or just a group of them to develop a set of common rules for determining the tax base of companies with operations in several EU Member States. In every participating Member State corporations could subsequently opt for the adoption of this common European tax base to be used regarding all their activities within the EU. As framework for defining such a common European tax base the International Financial Reporting Standards (IFRS) have been suggested. Furthermore, the group's tax base is intended not to include intra-group profits.

=== Administration ===
Depending on the location where the parent of the EU group resides, the corresponding Member State is responsible for assessing the group's tax base. However, the corporate income tax rate will be determined by each individual Member State. Correlated, the overall profit of the group needs to be allocated to the individual Member States to be taxed there. This allocation has to be regulated by the terms of a formula the participating Member States have previously agreed upon. The so-called formula apportionment (FA) usually employs factors like capital, sales and labour on which the allocation is based. Prior to the allocation, these factors need to be weighted. Finally, every allocated share of profit is taxed in the respective Member State with the relevant corporate tax rate.

=== Mechanism ===
1. Each member of an EU-group, i.e., the parent and related subsidiaries residing in the EU which constitute the group, computes its profits separately according to the same harmonized tax rules.
2. The profits of each member are added and consolidated at the level of the group's parent.
3. Group income is allocated according to a specific formula to the Member States where companies of the group are located.
4. Allocated profits are taxed according to the national tax rates.

== Scope of the CCCTB group ==
=== Consolidated group ===
In financial accounting, subsidiaries are included into consolidated statements, if they are controlled by their parent. This is usually assumed when the shareholding exceeds 50%. Strictly legal criteria make it easy to decide for tax purposes whether a company is part of the group or not. However, the participation threshold should be higher in order to avoid excessive tax planning. A high participation threshold (e.g., 75% or 90%) takes into account that consolidation implies a high degree of economic integration of the members of the group. Moreover, in this case the subsidiary's profit accrues mainly to the parent. The European Commission proposes that a company is included into the CCCTB group if the shareholding exceeds 50% and more than 75% of the capital is owned by the parent (all-in-all-out).

=== Formula apportionment ===
The CCCTB replaces separate accounting by formula apportionment. In general, the following factors could be applied for the allocation of corporate income:

- Microeconomic factors:
  - Capital, labour and/or sales;
  - Value added of the group in each Member State.
- Macroeconomic factors:
  - E.g. gross national product.

The allocation system should aim at simplicity and legal certainty. The formula apportionment should include allocation factors to be fair (inter-nation-equity) by reflecting the economic activity in the Member States.

=== Three-factor formula ===
The European Commission proposes a formula for corporate income tax apportionment based on three factors: capital (assets), labour (payroll and number of employees), and sales.

$$Share A = \left[ \frac{1}{3} \frac{Sales^A}{Sales^{Group}} + \frac{1}{3} \left( \frac{1}{2} \frac{Payroll^A}{Payroll^{Group}} + \frac{1}{2} \frac{No\ of\ employees^A}{No\ of\ employees^{Group}}\right) + \frac{1}{3} \frac{Assets^A}{Assets^{Group}}\right] \cdot Con'd\ Tax\ Base$$

==== Example ====
Assume that company Z AG, resident in Germany, has a 100% subsidiary Y GmbH, resident in Slovakia. Z has a payroll of €3 million, capital of €150 million, and sales of €135 million. Y has a payroll of €5 million, capital of €50 million, and sales of €65 million. The total group income is €1 million. Suppose further that according to the arm's length standard Z earns €700,000 and Y €300,000. In the event of separate taxation, the total tax liability would amount to €267,000 = 0.3 × €700,000 + 0.19 × €300,000. The average tax rate of the group would thus amount to 26.7%.

Assume now that the group applies for the CCCTB. The group computes the tax base of both Z and Y according to the CCCTB rules and subsequently both Z's and Y's tax computations are submitted to the German tax authorities. When the tax calculations are agreed upon, the tax base has to be apportioned between Germany and Slovakia. The group pays tax on the share of profit apportioned to Slovakia at the Slovak tax rate (19%), while tax on the German share of profit is paid at the German tax rate (30%). In this example, as it is proposed by the European Commission, capital, labour and sales are equally-weighted.

The tax liability for both countries is hence the following:

$Germany: 30\% \cdot \euro 1,000,000 \cdot \left[ \frac{1}{3} \cdot \frac{\euro 150,000,000}{\euro 200,000,000} + \frac{1}{3} \cdot \frac{\euro 3,000,000}{\euro 8,000,000} + \frac{1}{3} \cdot \frac{\euro 135,000,000}{\euro 200,000,000} \right] = \euro 180,000.$

$Slovakia: 19\% \cdot \euro 1,000,000 \cdot \left[ \frac{1}{3} \cdot \frac{\euro 50,000,000}{\euro 200,000,000} + \frac{1}{3} \cdot \frac{\euro 5,000,000}{\euro 8,000,000} + \frac{1}{3} \cdot \frac{\euro 65,000,000}{\euro 200,000,000} \right] = \euro 76,000.$

The total tax bill of the group amounts to €256,000, therefore the group's average tax rate equals 25.6%.

=== Advantages and disadvantages ===
Each eligible group would only have to deal with one tax administration and would be subject to a single set of tax rules. All Member States which wish to adopt the new tax code would be able to do so without amending their existing tax code since CCCTB would only be another tax code in addition to the already existing 28 national tax codes. Furthermore, each Member State would have the right to set its own tax rate, thereby keeping up fiscal sovereignty and maintaining the possibility of tax competition. Also, tax planning opportunities within the EU would be eliminated to a great extent. However, the formula apportionment creates new incentives for tax planning. Last, enterprises are likely to benefit from intra-group consolidation and compensation of profits and losses.

=== Compliance costs ===
The European Commission's proposal is likely to lead to a significant reduction in compliance costs, in particular for companies. It will also reduce the number of different tax codes companies have to apply. Cross-border transactions within the EU would cease to give rise to specific tax compliance costs for companies. On the other hand, tax administrations have to operate an additional tax system if the current tax code is maintained (parallel tax base, CCCTB). It might be the case that some tax administrations find their workload increased by the new tax rules. Last, design and operation of the allocation process will determine administrative and compliance costs.

== International investment ==
=== Loss compensation and group relief ===
A group relief is available independently of the seat of a company within the EU. Therefore, the CCCTB implies a consolidation of losses and profits within the group. The allocation of the overall profit would not be determined by separate accounting but by the formula. Because of EU-wide consolidation of profits and losses, each Member State bears a subsidiary's loss in proportion to its share of the overall profit. Acceptance of foreign losses by Member States is thus easier to attain. Because of the consolidation of the EU-wide operations of the firm, it is sensible to assume that there are sufficient profits to absorb losses of group members. Hence, an immediate cross-border loss compensation is available, making interest and liquidity disadvantages disappear. In the case of an overall loss, a loss carry forward and a loss carry back must exist in each Member State. The European Commission proposes an unlimited loss carry forward. However, whether group relief for third countries, i.e., non-EU countries, is available, depends on national legislation.

=== Dividend taxation ===
All intra-group dividends are treated as tax-free domestic dividends. Thus, profits of subsidiaries and permanent establishments (PE) are equally taxed and all profits are taxed only once. For dividends from third countries, the European Commission proposes tax exemption and an anti-abuse rule (which is to switch over to credit in case of low taxation).

=== Neutrality of legal form ===
More in general, subsidiaries are treated as PEs under CCCTB regulation. Hence, there is no tax incentive for one of these forms of establishments. This is especially true for the following features of corporate taxation: loss compensation, taxation of hidden reserves, financing and transfer pricing. However, some tax rules, particularly the taxation of hidden reserves have not been dealt with in detail in the proposals.

== International profit shifting ==
=== Interest expenses ===
Interest expenses are part of the group's total income. Thus, it is ensured that the actual costs are deducted (net principle). Tax arbitrage is not possible because business expenses do reduce the income of all companies proportionately to their respective share of the overall profit. Companies cannot claim expenses in a high-tax jurisdiction, while profits are taxed in low-tax jurisdictions. However, tax arbitrage is possible in the case of subsidiaries located in third countries. Consequently, the European Commission proposes to introduce an anti-abuse rule which limits the interest deductibility.

=== Tax deferral ===
Because of the equal tax treatment of PEs and subsidiaries, tax deferral is not possible any longer. Profits and losses of subsidiaries are included into the tax base irrespective of the actual profit distribution. According to the formula, profit in a low-tax country is also burdened with the tax level of other EU Member States. However, the problem remains in the case of subsidiaries located in third countries. To address this issue, the European Commission proposes CFC rules for subsidiaries in third states.

=== Transfer pricing ===
The group's total profit is calculated at the level of the parent, hence transfer pricing is no longer necessary for EU transactions. The current complexities of interpretation and application of the OECD guidelines on transfer pricing cease to exist for EU activities. Double taxation due to conflicting qualifications can no longer arise for EU transactions as well. Additionally, companies do not have to record transfer prices for the EU tax authorities any longer. Thus, cross-border transactions within the EU would cease to give rise to specific tax costs due to conflicting qualifications. However, transfer pricing problems are replaced by allocation problems. Furthermore, the problems of transfer pricing do not vanish regarding transactions with third countries.

== New tax planning opportunities ==
=== Economic consequences of formula apportionment ===
In principle, the profit tax becomes a tax on the factors included into the formula, i.e., capital, sales and labour. This means that the tax bill increases in the country where one of the factors rises. Thus, tax planning is still possible as companies have an incentive to shift the tax base to low-tax jurisdictions by means of transferring the formula factors, e.g., capital (i.e., assets) could be transferred from Germany to Slovakia. However, tax planning under separate accounting focuses on tax base shifting whereas tax planning under formula apportionment focuses on the location of investments.

All proposals eliminate profit shifting by means of transfer pricing or financing. Basically, formula apportionment works like a tax on each factor included in the formula. Since the Commission does not want to question the Member States' right to set the tax rate, there is still room for tax competition via the tax rates. Due to the common tax base across the EU, it is no longer possible for Member States to compensate high-tax rates with a narrow tax base or vice versa. The Member States compete rather for real investments than for tax bases. The commission's proposal of a CCCTB could be a solution to the problem of international corporate tax planning within the EU. In particular, the CCCTB eliminates the incentive to shift profits to low-tax countries via transfer pricing or financing. However, there is still room for tax competition between Member States as long as the tax rates are not harmonised within the EU. Moreover, the existing problems of the arm's length principle continue to exist with respect to third countries. Effectively, the CCCTB introduces a new system of formula apportionment in addition to the system of arm's length. Thus, at present, the introduction of the CCCTB does not seem realistic on a political level, because the harmonisation requirements are high: a common tax base, a European profit allocation formula and common consolidation and anti-abuse rules would have to be introduced.

The economic consequences of formula apportionment can be examined in further detail with regard to the individual factors:

==== Capital ====
Given the overall profit π and the total capital K, the tax is effectively a tax on capital invested in state i: $t_i \cdot \pi \cdot \frac{K_{i}}{K}$

Generally, investments in a Member State increase the capital and, therefore, trigger higher taxes in this country. Regarding immobile factors, formula apportionment works like a property tax. Consequently, the group experiences an incentive to locate capital in low tax countries. However, the net benefit is relevant as the group will take into account the taxes and the public goods provided by a Member State.

==== Labour ====
If the number of employees increases in a Member State, the tax burden increases in this Member State as well, given that the group's profit remains the same. Thus, the production in a high tax jurisdiction might increase the total tax burden of the group compared to the production in a low-tax jurisdiction. The tax bill hence increases in a country where labour costs rise. Thereby, labour is burdened with corporate tax, potentially forcing wages and salaries down, especially in high-tax jurisdictions.

==== Sales ====
If the amount of sales increases in a Member State, the tax burden increases in this Member State, given that the group's profit remains the same. Thus, selling goods in a high-tax jurisdiction might increase the total tax burden of the group compared to the sale of goods in a low-tax jurisdiction. Sales are calculated on a destination basis with a fall-back clause. Tax planning incentives on the sales distribution.

==== Example ====
Based on the background and numbers given in the context of the example provided in 2.3.1. further above, the following example is meant to illustrate the possibility of tax planning under formula apportionment:

If the group transfers assets - i.e. capital - of €100,000,000 to the Slovak subsidiary, the capital ratio is reversed, becoming €50,000,000/€200,000,000 in Germany and €150,000,000/€200,000,000 in Slovakia. With regard to the tax payments the group has to pay, this shift has the following consequence:

$Germany: 30\% \cdot \euro 1,000,000 \cdot \left[ \frac{1}{3} \cdot \frac{\euro 50,000,000}{\euro 200,000,000} + \frac{1}{3} \cdot \frac{\euro 3,000,000}{\euro 8,000,000} + \frac{1}{3} \cdot \frac{\euro 135,000,000}{\euro 200,000,000} \right] = \euro 130,000.$

$Slovakia: 19\% \cdot \euro 1,000,000 \cdot \left[ \frac{1}{3} \cdot \frac{\euro 150,000,000}{\euro 200,000,000} + \frac{1}{3} \cdot \frac{\euro 5,000,000}{\euro 8,000,000} + \frac{1}{3} \cdot \frac{\euro 65,000,000}{\euro 200,000,000} \right] = \euro 107,667.$

Now, the total tax bill of the group amounts only to €237,667, with the group's average tax rate equalling 23.77%. Thus, the group's tax burden has significantly decreased (from 25.60% to 23.77%) and the allocation of tax revenues has changed as well.
