= Claude Wilfrid Etoka =

Congolese businessman

- Born: 30 May 1969 (age 57); Brazzaville, Congo
- Occupations: CEO of SARPD Oil and Oil Palm
- Known for: CEO of SARPD Oil, Political Exposed Person

Claude Wilfrid Etoka (a.k.a. Willy Etoka) (born 30 May 1969, in Brazzaville, Congo) is a Congolese businessperson. He is CEO of the oil trading company SARPD Oil and Oil Palm. With a wealth estimated at US$ 500 millions, he is known for acting as a trustee of the family of the president of the republic of Congo.

== Career ==
Etoka founded SARPD Oil in 2003, which became, according to The Times, a "rising star in African oil trading", with a trading floor based in Geneva and marketing operations set up in Morocco under Casablanca Finance City regulations.

Etoka is a politically exposed person. His bank accounts at BNP Paribas were closed due to his known close links with the president of Congo and the improbable level of profitability of his companies arising out of corruption and misappropriations of Congolese oils. His company supplies 10% of the Congolese fuel market, In Jeune Afrique (11 May 2015). Etoka featured as one of the well-connected ‘Golden Boys’; new African traders breaking through in the oil markets traditionally dominated by the international oil giants which are controlled and owned by Europeans (Glencore, Trafigura, Vitol, Mercuria, Oryx Energy). Within 10 years, his company SARPD Oil ranked as the fifth oil player in Africa in terms of trading.

SARPD Oil runs large trading and financial operations in partnership with global companies such as Glencore. In 2015, the two partners structured a long-term oil-deal with the Republic of the Congo. The deal was criticised as being a disguised debt not inscribed into the national budget of Congo-Brazzaville.

== Companies ==
=== Congo Bitumes ===
Etoka was the director of Congo Bitumes.

=== SARPD Oil ===
Etoka is the CEO and purported to be the sole shareholder of SARPD Oil (African Corporation of Petroleum Exploration and Distribution).SARPD was incorporated as a Mauritius company in 2003 as a company specialising in trading petroleum products in Central Africa and in international transshipment, followed by a BVI company.

=== WEC Group ===
WEC Group is the parent company of Eco-Oil Energy. Group WEC Marine Limited is an offshore company incorporated on 8 June 2012 in Cyprus with the sole shareholder to be Claude Wilfrid Etoka holding 20,000 shares and a share capital of €20,000; the group is chaired by Etoka, with an annual turnover of $1 billion.

=== Eco-Oil Energy SA ===
Etoka is the president and CEO of Eco-Oil Energy SA. Eco-Oil Energy is the first company in the Congo producing for the “fat” sector in over 21 years. Established in 2013, the Congolese registered company is a subsidiary of WEC Group and is 100% owned by Eco-Energy SA Malaysia. Eco-Oil Energy purchased the assets of the former PALM Sangha and RNPC (National Authority of Congo Palmeraie) and invested 350 billion FCFA with Malaysian partners in a chain which industrially produces palm oil.

In August 2015, Etoka inaugurated the largest margarine factory in Congo-Brazzaville, drawing raw materials from farms run by Eco-Oil Energy SA. Margarine production is located in a plant in Mokéko, located near Ouesso, the capital of Sangha, to date there has been an investment of 50 billion FCFA (€76 million). Plant production is 7,000 palm oil bottles and two tons of margarine per hour.

The company Eco-Oil Energy SA is a Congolese company owned by ECO OIL ENERGY Sàrl, a Swiss limited company, domiciliated at c/o Comatrans SA, rue Jean-Sénebier 4, 1205 Genève, Switzerland. ECO OIL ENERGY Sàrl has a share capital of CHF20,000.

The whole owner of ECO OIL ENERGY Sàrl is GROUP WEC MARINE LIMITED, an offshore company in Cyprus.

=== Congo Investments ===
Etoka is the director of Congo Investments, a private company mandated by the Congolese government to privatise public assets, giving 30% ownership to Etoka on all public goods sold for a lower price to private investors.

=== Investments ===
In October 2015, Etoka acquired five franchises from the MacDonald Group to open on the US West Coast.

In December 2015, at a press release Marion Maréchal-Le Pen (French politician member of the Front National party) presented to future African and Asian international investors. She revealed that "Congo Capital Enterprises” (CCE) would present “potential business opportunities representing three billion" of investment, with a statement signed by the vice president of CCE, Innocent Dimi. Etoka, as CCE president, formally denied the Group's commitment by declaring that the initiative of Innocent Dimi is “the result of individual initiative of an employee of the group and does not undertake the activities of Congo Capital Enterprises SA, which is not intended to interfere in French politics”. And stated that his group "is not intended to invest outside the national territory". In a statement to L’Observateur, Etoka also states the employee had "taken it upon himself to send a letter on Company Letterhead to one of his business contacts to which he was previously linked ... this mail was not authorized by management of Congo Capital Firms”.

== Forbes Africa ==
Forbes Africa is owned by Philippe Chironi, 62, co-founder of d’Orion who is under investigation in France for money laundering bribery for the benefit of the Sassou-Nguesso family. Philippe Chironi was interviewed in September 2015 by the French judge on the dite « biens mal acquis » focusing on the Congolese President and other members of the family.

Forbes Africa — using the similarity with the famous Forbes Magazine — has been used to promote the Sassou Nguesso family and create a veneer of respectability for the various nominees, laundering funds for the Sassou Nguesso family. For example, Etoka won the prize for the 6th edition of the Bâtisseurs de L’Economie Africaine (Builder of the African Economy) held in Abidjan, Côte d'Ivoire. The prize is for personalities that provide a substantial contribution to the economic and social development of Africa. This was a way of legitimating the rapid accumulation of wealth acquired through money laundering.

Lucien Ebata, 47, is one of these intermediaries related to Sassou-Nguesso family. Resident on the other side of the Congo River to Kinshasa, the businessman is at the head of Orion Group Ltd, the authorised capital of $10 million ( €8.8 million). This holding company established in Switzerland has been registered in the Seychelles since 2009 by Panamanian firm Mossack Fonseca, via the Luxembourg company FIGED, according to the documents consulted by Le Monde. The main activity of the group, which has several subsidiaries, is marketing petroleum products. His clients include the Anglo-Dutch major Shell and the National Society of the Congo oils (CRS), including Denis Christel Sassou-Nguesso, the youngest son of the Congolese president , is Deputy Director General of the SNPC.
