= Mwinda =

Mwinda is a Canadian free quarterly bilingual magazine for Afro-Caribbean young adults. The glossy, full colour magazine covers culture, lifestyle and fashion with an intimate tone. Mwinda Magazine also features reports on social and political issues. It is published by Mwinda publications and was founded in 2008 by Toward Excellence graduate Messia Ditshimba and Tyson Mutombo. They also edit the magazine. The headquarters is in Richmond, British Columbia.
