= (−)-Endo-fenchol dehydrogenase =

Class of enzymes

Identifiers
- EC no.: 1.1.1.322

Databases
- IntEnz: IntEnz view
- BRENDA: BRENDA entry
- ExPASy: NiceZyme view
- KEGG: KEGG entry
- MetaCyc: metabolic pathway
- PRIAM: profile
- PDB structures: RCSB PDB PDBe PDBsum
Search
- PMC: articles
- PubMed: articles
- NCBI: proteins

(−)-endo-fenchol dehydrogenase (EC 1.1.1.322, l-endo-fenchol dehydrogenase, FDH) is an enzyme with systematic name (−)-endo-fenchol:NAD(P)^{+} oxidoreductase. This enzyme catalyses the following chemical reaction

(-)-endo-fenchol
+ NAD^{+}
H^{+}
H^{+}
(+)-fenchone
+ NADH

The enzyme occurs in the plant Foeniculum vulgare and can use the alternative cofactor, nicotinamide adenine dinucleotide phosphate.
