= Corporation tax in France =

French tax

Corporate tax in France deals with the tax payable in France on the profits earned by companies. In 2024, the corporate tax rate (Impôt sur les Sociétés) is 25%.

== Location of profits ==
A company is subject to French corporate tax on profits generated in France, in addition to any profit allocated to France by virtue of international tax treaties, after taking into account tax deductible costs.

== Rate ==
The 2017 French corporate tax rate was 15% of the taxable income up to and including €38,120, 28% up to €75,000 and above which the rate is 33.3%. By 2020, the whole taxable income of all companies will be taxed at 28%.

On 7 November 2017 the French National Assembly approved a new corporate tax exclusively for the year 2017.
Business with more than €1 billion in sales a year are subject to pay a tax rate with 38.3% instead of 33.3%. If a firm makes more revenue than €3 billion the rate will be 43.3%.

== Tax credits ==
In 2012 a new tax credit was introduced to make France more competitive. Companies get a tax credit of 7% of total wage & salary costs up to a limit of 2.5 times the minimum salary (in 2017 the minimum salary was €1,460). The effect is to substantially reduce the effective rate of corporation tax. The tax credit amounts to 19 billion euros (about 40% of gross corporate tax take).

== Allowances ==
Certain items of income are exempt from corporate tax:

- Research Tax Credit
- Innovative start-ups
- New Business
- Higher depreciation allowance scheme

== See also ==
- Taxation in France
