= Office central de répression de la grande délinquance financière =

The Office central pour la répression de la grande délinquance financière (OCRGDF) is a French law enforcement agency tasked with combating fraud, money-laundering and the financiers of terrorism. Its name translates more or less as Major Financial Crimes Office.

Created in 1990 following the Sommet de l'Arche, this specialized unit falls under the authority of the vice-director for organized and white collar crime (SLCODF), which in turn is responsible to the Central direction centrale de la Police judiciaire.

Its role involves coordinating the police and military police (gendarmerie). In particular, it investigates the notifications of suspicion transmitted by TRACFIN, the French anti-money laundering authority. It is also responsible for cooperation with Europol and Interpol.

It is directed by the division commissioner Jean-Marc Souvira.

== See also ==
- Direction centrale de la Police judiciaire
