= Frères des Hommes =

French aid organization

Frères des Hommes (Brotherhood of Men) is a non-profit organisation founded in 1965. Based in France, the organisation is involved in development projects in Asia, Africa, and Latin America, mainly projects in small-scale agriculture, social economy, and democratic citizenship.
