= Louvain Coopération =

- Founded: July 1961; 64 years ago United Kingdom
- Type: Non-profit; INGO
- Headquarters: Louvain-la-Neuve, Belgium
- Location: Global
- Services: health, mental health, food security, microeconomy, mutual insurance and International solidarity movement
- Fields: Legal advocacy, Media attention, direct-appeal campaigns, research, lobbying
- Members: 31 employees (2015)
- General manager: Félix Vanderstricht
- Key people: Marthe Nyssens (President of the board)
- Website: www.louvaincooperation.org

Louvain Coopération is a Belgian International non-governmental organization (INGO) located in the university city of Louvain-la-Neuve. This organization is a member of the Federation of Development Cooperation NGO (Acodev). The NGO was founded by members of the University of Louvain (UCLouvain) and is an important part of the Belgian universities NGO grouping (Uni4coop), It operates on an annual budgetary basis of around €8 million, and is active in about 40 projects distributed in nine countries of the world, if you count Belgium. Its fields of activity are: health, including mental health and in specific gender-related contexts, food security, microeconomy, mutual organization and international solidarity.

== Action in the South ==
One of the particularities of Louvain Coopération as an NGO is to supervise internships with students of the University of Louvain (UCLouvain) in the Global South. The NGO also acts in favour of young people of the Global South, helping, for example, the children of Kinshasa to "Exit the Street" or fighting against violence against children in El Alto (Bolivia).

== Action in the North ==
In addition to its action in the South, Louvain Coopération participates each year in the inter-university program called "Campus plein sud", which aims to raise awareness among students about relations between developed countries and the Global South. Since 2012, in partnership with the Louvain School of Engineering and Engineers Without Borders, Louvain Coopération is also developing a program linked to development cooperation entitled "Ingénieux Sud". As an integral part of the university curriculum since 2016, this program supervises engineering students in the implementation of "appropriate techniques" in response to needs identified by local populations.

== Fundraising ==
From a financial point of view, Louvain Coopération operates on the basis of public funding granted by the Belgian Federal Public Service for Foreign Affairs, the collection of funds from public or private donors, personal donations, and funds raised through the support of startups and artists.

== Geographical distribution of national directorates ==
- Central headquarters : Louvain-la-Neuve
- Directorate Benin - Togo : Cotonou
- Directorate Bolivia - Peru : La Paz
- Directorate Democratic Republic of the Congo: Bukavu
- Directorate Cambodia : Phnom Penh
- Directorate Burundi : Bujumbura
- Directorate Madagascar : Morondava
