= Sherpa (association) =

French law association

Sherpa is an international non-governmental organization, founded in 2001. Sherpa carries out advocacy, strategic litigation, legal research and capacity building activities, in order to strengthen economic actors’ accountability and build up a legal framework that better protects the environment, communities and human rights.

To implement these activities, Sherpa brings together lawyers, legal experts, academics, NGOs, local associations, and many other experts who support its action by putting forward an innovative approach to law. Sherpa has, for example, brought various claims for misleading advertising against the French retailer Auchan and the South Korean conglomerate Samsung. In both cases, the NGO alleged that the companies did wrongfully claim to be ethical companies.

== Actions ==
Sherpa uses the law to fight economic actors’ impunity and defend globalisation victims . By strengthening economic and financial accountability, Sherpa advocates for an effective legal framework that protects the environment, communities, and workers.

The nonprofit initiates strategic litigation and judicial battles against multinationals corporations, and conducts legal research activities allowing it to implement its advocacy activities.

Sherpa also leads capacity sharing activities, such as the project “Developing the capacities of civil society in Benin, Togo, and Senegal to ensure that companies respect human rights and environmental law, and to enable the implementation of more protective public policies”. The project involves collaboration with other organizations, such as RSE-et-PED France, RSE Bénin, RSE-et-PED Togo and La Lumière.
