= List of political parties in Gabon =

This article lists political parties in Gabon.

Before the 2023 coup d’etat, Gabon was a one-party dominant state with the Gabonese Democratic Party (PDG) in power, headed by Ali Bongo. Opposition parties were allowed, but are widely considered to have no real chance of gaining power. From 1968 to 1990, the PDG was the only authorized party in the country.

Since the coup, the political situation has changed with the Democratic Union of Builders now the dominant party. The Gabonese Democratic Party now primarily represents the anti-coup factions while Democratic Union of Builders represents the pro-coup factions.

== The parties ==
=== Parliamentary parties ===
| Party | Abbr. | Ideology | Assembly |
|---|---|---|---|
| Democratic Union of Builders; Union démocratique des bâtisseurs | UDB | Populism | 101 / 145 |
| Gabonese Democratic Party; Parti démocratique gabonais | PDG | Conservatism; Authoritarianism; Right-wing populism | 17 / 145 |
| PDG–UDB common list Liste commune PDG–UDB | PDG–UDB | | 4 / 145 |
| Rally for the Fatherland and Modernity; Rassemblement pour la patrie et la modernité | RPM | Anti-corruption | 3 / 145 |
| National Union; Union nationale | UN | Welfarism | 2 / 145 |
| Gabonese Social Democrats; Sociaux-démocrates gabonais | SDG | Social democracy | 2 / 145 |
| Union for the Republic; Union pour la république | UPR | | 1 / 145 |
| Democratic Socialist Front; Front démocratique socialiste | FDS | Democratic socialism | 1 / 145 |
| Social Democratic Party; Parti social-démocrate | PSD | Social democracy | 1 / 145 |
| Rally for the New Republic; Rassemblement pour la nouvelle république | RNR | Reformism | 1 / 145 |
| Christian Democratic Bloc; Bloc démocratique chrétien | BDC | Christian democracy | 1 / 145 |

=== Other parties ===
- African Development Movement (Mouvement Africain de Développement)
- Common Movement for Development (Mouvement Commun pour le Développement)
- African Forum for Reconstruction (Forum Africain pour la Réconstruction)
- Circle of Liberal Reformers(Cercle des Libéraux Réformateurs)
- Democratic and Republican Alliance (Alliance Démocratique et Républicaine)
- Gabonese Progress Party (Parti gabonais du progrès)
- Gabonese Socialist Party (Parti Socialiste Gabonais)
- Gabonese Union for Democracy and Development (Union Gabonaise pour la Démocratie et le Développement)
- Jeunesse Gabonais, the first political party in Gabonese history
- Movement for National Rectification (Mouvement de Redressement National)
- National Woodcutters Rally-Kombila (Rassemblement National des Bûcherons – KOMBILA)
- National Woodcutters' Rally – Rally for Gabon (Rassemblement national des bûcherons – Rassemblement pour le Gabon)
- Rally of Democrats (Rassemblement des Démocrates)
- The Democrats (Les Démocrates)
- Union for the New Republic(Union pour la Nouvelle République)
- Union of the Gabonese People (Union du Peuple Gabonais)

== See also ==
- List of political parties by country
