= 2018 Gabonese parliamentary election =

- 6 October 2018 (first round); 27 October 2018 (runoff)
- All 143 seats in the National Assembly; 72 seats needed for a majority
- Turnout: 58.63%
Party	Leader	Seats	+/–
PDG	Ali Bongo Ondimba	98	−15
LD		11	
RV		6	
SDG		5	
RHM		5	
UN		2	
PSD	Pierre Claver Maganga Moussavou	2	+1
CLR		1	0
PDG–RV		1	
DN		1	
FER		1	
UPNR		1	0
PDG–UDIS		1	
RPG	Paul Mba Abessole	0	−3
Independents		8	
This lists parties that won seats. See the complete results below.

Parliamentary elections were held in Gabon in 2018 alongside municipal elections; the first round was held on 6 October and the second round on 27 October. Despite losing 15 seats, the ruling Gabonese Democratic Party maintained its two-thirds majority in the National Assembly, winning 98 of the 143 seats.

== Background ==
Parliamentary elections are normally held every five years, and the previous elections were held in December 2011. The elections were set for 27 December 2016, before being postponed until 29 July 2017 and then April 2018 to enable political dialogue and allegedly due to a shortage of funds. However, the elections were not held on 28 April 2018, without the government announcing a report or asking the Constitutional Council for another delay. This meant that the term of the National Assembly had legally expired. As a result, the Constitutional Court dissolved the National Assembly and temporarily reassigned its powers to the Senate (which was still legally constituted), and dismissed Prime Minister Emmanuel Issoze-Ngondet.

== Electoral system ==
The 143 members of the National Assembly are elected from single-member constituencies using the two-round system.

== Results ==
The first round had a 58.63% turnout, but only 28.5% in the Estuaire province, where nearly half of the population lives.

The ruling Gabonese Democratic Party (PDG) won 74 seats and two minor parties in alliance with PDG won a seat each (RV and UDIS). The Democrats (LD) won three seats, while the Social Democratic Party (PSD) and the Union for the New Republic (UPNR) won one each. Two Independents also won seats.

The first round was postponed in the Elelem constituency in Woleu department in Woleu-Ntem Province due to "organizational reasons". The run-off in Elelem was held on 10 November; it was won by the candidate of the Heritage and Modernity Rally.

60 constituencies had a run-off vote as no candidate secured a majority in the first round. Full official results were expected in mid-December.

Party	First round			Second round			Total seats	+/–
Party	Votes	%	Seats	Votes	%	Seats	Total seats	+/–
Gabonese Democratic Party			73			25	98	–15
The Democrats			3			8	11	New
Restoration of Republican Values			0			6	6	New
Social Democrats of Gabon			0			5	5	New
Heritage and Modernity Rally			1			4	5	New
National Union			0			2	2	New
Social Democratic Party			1			1	2	+1
Circle of Liberal Reformers			0			1	1	0
PDG–RV			1			0	1	New
New Democracy			0			1	1	New
Republican Equality Front			0			1	1	New
Union for the New Republic			1			0	1	0
PDG–UDIS			1			0	1	New
Rally for Gabon			0			0	0	–3
Other parties			0			0	0	–
Independents			2			6	8	+8
Total			83			60	143	+23
Registered voters/turnout	680,194	58.63						
Source: Résultats par circo, Gabon Actu
