= 2025 Gabonese parliamentary election =

- 27 September 2025 (first round); 11 October 2025 (runoff); 18 October 2025 (re-run); 2 November 2025 (re-run runoff)
- All 145 seats in the National Assembly; 73 seats needed for a majority
Party	Leader	Seats
UDB	Brice Oligui Nguema	101
PDG	Angélique Ngoma	17
PDG–BDG	–	4
RPM	Alexandre Barro Chambrier	3
UN	Paulette Missambo	2
SDG	Juste Louangou Bouyomeka	2
BDC	Anna-Claudine Mavioga	1
FDS	Anges-Kévin Nzigou	1
RNR	Jean Ping	1
PSD	Pierre Claver Maganga Moussavou	1
UPR	Gervais Oniane	1
Independents	–	8
This lists parties that won seats. See the complete results below.
Vice President of the Government before	Vice President of the Government after
Alexandre Barro Chambrier; RPM	Alexandre Barro Chambrier; RPM

Parliamentary elections were held in Gabon on 27 September 2025 alongside municipal elections, with a second round held on 11 October in constituencies where no candidate received a majority. A third round took place on 18 October in eight constituencies. The Gabonese Democratic Party, which had dominated Gabonese politics from independence in 1961 until the 2023 Gabonese coup d'état, suffered its first defeat in an election since independence, falling to a rump of 17 seats in the National Assembly.

== Background ==
In July 2025 president Brice Oligui Nguema, who came to power following the 2023 coup, established his own political party, the Democratic Union of Builders (UDB).

== Electoral system ==
The members of the National Assembly are elected via the two-round system: 143 constituencies are in Gabon proper, while two seats are elected by overseas Gabonese.

Electoral rolls underwent revision from 14 July to 12 August. Local electoral commissions were set up by 26 July, while nomination of candidates was held from 27 July to 7 August.

== Candidates ==
There were around 1,600 candidates competing for 145 seats in parliament, while around 17,000 individuals are competing for various municipal and departmental council positions.

== Campaign ==
Campaigning began on 17 September.

== Conduct ==
More than 900,000 people were eligible to vote. Polling was slightly delayed in Libreville due to early morning rain.

Allegations of fraud and mismanagement of the process were made by the opposition. One unsuccessful candidate lamented a "return of the old system". Former Prime Minister Raymond Ndong Sima exclaimed "Back to square one! ... We are continuing the system that we were supposed to have discarded for the good of all." One article questioned if one non-democratic regime was simply being exchanged for another one.

Observers from Benin, Togo, Mauritania and Guinea said the second round of voting took place in a calm atmosphere despite a lack of enthusiasm.

== Results ==
Preliminary results released by the interior ministry indicated the Democratic Union of Builders was in the lead, followed far behind by the Gabonese Democratic Party of the Bongo regime. A second round of voting was ordered for 11 October in 77 constituencies where a candidate did not obtain a majority.

In the constituencies of Ntoum 1st Arrondissement and Douigny 1st elections were held on 18 October with a second round on 2 November. Elections were cancelled in the constituencies of Lékoni-Lékori 1st, Ndougou 2nd and Ntem 2nd.

Party	First round			Second round			Total seats
Party	Votes	%	Seats	Votes	%	Seats	Total seats
Democratic Union of Builders	163,410	43.68	51	84,032	51.39	50	101
Gabonese Democratic Party	63,867	17.07	5	35,849	21.92	12	17
Rally for the Fatherland and Modernity	20,072	5.37	1	7,161	4.38	2	3
National Union	14,833	3.96	0	9,259	5.66	2	2
Union for the Republic	10,724	2.87	1	2,474	1.51	0	1
Gabonese Democratic Party–Democratic Union of Builders	7,665	2.05	4			0	4
Gabonese Social Democrats	6,108	1.63	0	3,253	1.99	2	2
Democratic Socialist Front	4,736	1.27	0	697	0.43	1	1
Patriotic Alliance	4,641	1.24	0			0	0
The Democrats	4,170	1.11	0			0	0
Together for Gabon	2,911	0.78	0	160	0.10	0	0
Social Democratic Party	2,519	0.67	1			0	1
Concerted National Coordination for Development	2,507	0.67	0			0	0
Party for Development and Social Solidarity	1,655	0.44	0			0	0
Circle of Liberal Reformers	1,581	0.42	0	189	0.12	0	0
Gabonese Patriotic Front	1,577	0.42	0			0	0
Rally for the New Republic	1,609	0.43	0	743	0.45	1	1
National Party for Work and Progress	1,372	0.37	0			0	0
Union for Democracy and Social Integration	1,217	0.33	0			0	0
Rally for Gabon	1,200	0.32	0			0	0
Party for the Seven Wonders of the Gabonese People	1,031	0.28	0			0	0
Union of the Gabonese People	995	0.27	0			0	0
Rally of Gabonese Awakening for Action, Restoration and Development	866	0.23	0			0	0
Democratic and Republican Alliance	715	0.19	0			0	0
Gabonese Patriotic Party	634	0.17	0			0	0
Progressive Socialist Union	632	0.17	0			0	0
Rally for Gabon–UN–LD–GDC	574	0.15	0			0	0
Citizen Movement of Freedom Volunteers	536	0.14	0	773	0.47	0	0
Heritage and Modernity Rally	484	0.13	0	509	0.31	0	0
The Democrats–Rally for Gabon	444	0.12	0			0	0
Gabonese Socialist Party	437	0.12	0			0	0
Christian Democratic Bloc	434	0.12	0	286	0.17	1	1
Independent Centre Party of Gabon	414	0.11	0			0	0
Union of the Gabonese People–Gabonese Progress Party	412	0.11	0			0	0
Unitary Republican Dynamic	343	0.09	0			0	0
Citizen Awakening Party	343	0.09	0			0	0
Gabonese Socialist Union	328	0.09	0			0	0
Rally for Democracy and Progress	300	0.08	0			0	0
Congress for Democracy and Justice	266	0.07	0			0	0
Large Rainbow Rally	265	0.07	0			0	0
Association for Socialism in Gabon	237	0.06	0			0	0
Civic Conscience and Action	211	0.06	0			0	0
National Party for Work and Progress–PGP	205	0.05	0			0	0
Forum for the Defense of the Republic	190	0.05	0			0	0
Popular Movement of the Gabonese Youth	160	0.04	0			0	0
Union of Forces for Change	137	0.04	0			0	0
Bloc of United Patriots	125	0.03	0			0	0
Gabonese Democratic Renewal Party	124	0.03	0			0	0
Union for the New Republic	115	0.03	0			0	0
Rally for Gabon–Christian Democratic Bloc–UN–LD	93	0.02	0			0	0
Sovereigntists–Ecologists Party	88	0.02	0			0	0
Movement for National Rectification	82	0.02	0			0	0
Gabonese Progress Party	66	0.02	0			0	0
ADERE–Gabonese Patriotic Party–Gabonese Patriotic Front–UPNR	32	0.01	0			0	0
Independents	43,424	11.61	0	18,132	11.09	8	8
Vacant			2			1	3
Total	374,116	100.00	65	163,517	100.00	80	145
Valid votes	374,223	92.30		163,415	96.76		
Invalid/blank votes	31,228	7.70		5,469	3.24		
Total votes	405,451	100.00		168,884	100.00		
Registered voters/turnout	922,365	43.96		588,216	28.71		
Source: CNOCER (Note: The number of valid votes reported to be cast was 107 higher than the total number of votes reported to be cast for individual candidates in the first round and 102 lower in the second round.)

=== By constituency ===
Results by constituency
Constituency	Party	First round		Second round	
Constituency	Party	Votes	%	Votes	%
Libreville 1st Arrondissement, 1st	Democratic Union of Builders	2,460	51.20		
Libreville 1st Arrondissement, 1st	Gabonese Democratic Party	688	14.32		
Libreville 1st Arrondissement, 1st	National Union	459	9.55		
Libreville 1st Arrondissement, 1st	Independent	341	7.10		
Libreville 1st Arrondissement, 1st	Independent	302	6.29		
Libreville 1st Arrondissement, 1st	Together for Gabon	283	5.89		
Libreville 1st Arrondissement, 1st	Congress for Democracy and Justice	217	4.52		
Libreville 1st Arrondissement, 1st	Circle of Liberal Reformers	55	1.14		
Libreville 1st Arrondissement, 1st	Valid votes	4,805	88.26		
Libreville 1st Arrondissement, 1st	Invalid/blank votes	639	11.74		
Libreville 1st Arrondissement, 1st	Total votes	5,444	100		
Libreville 1st Arrondissement, 1st	Registered voters/turnout	19,968	27.26		
Libreville 1st Arrondissement, 2nd	Democratic Union of Builders	2,829	51.03		
Libreville 1st Arrondissement, 2nd	Gabonese Democratic Party	979	17.66		
Libreville 1st Arrondissement, 2nd	National Union	522	9.42		
Libreville 1st Arrondissement, 2nd	Independent	327	5.90		
Libreville 1st Arrondissement, 2nd	Union for the Republic	320	5.77		
Libreville 1st Arrondissement, 2nd	Patriotic Alliance	223	4.02		
Libreville 1st Arrondissement, 2nd	Circle of Liberal Reformers	126	2.27		
Libreville 1st Arrondissement, 2nd	Independent	121	2.18		
Libreville 1st Arrondissement, 2nd	Rally of Gabonese Awakening for Action, Restoration and Development	97	1.75		
Libreville 1st Arrondissement, 2nd	Valid votes	5,544	89.28		
Libreville 1st Arrondissement, 2nd	Invalid/blank votes	666	10.72		
Libreville 1st Arrondissement, 2nd	Total votes	6,210	100		
Libreville 1st Arrondissement, 2nd	Registered voters/turnout	20,944	29.65		
Libreville 2nd Arrondissement, 1st	Democratic Union of Builders	950	31.30	957	60.15
Libreville 2nd Arrondissement, 1st	Rally for the Fatherland and Modernity	474	15.62	634	39.85
Libreville 2nd Arrondissement, 1st	Gabonese Democratic Party	354	11.66		
Libreville 2nd Arrondissement, 1st	Independent	323	10.64		
Libreville 2nd Arrondissement, 1st	National Union	235	7.74		
Libreville 2nd Arrondissement, 1st	Union for the Republic	214	7.05		
Libreville 2nd Arrondissement, 1st	Gabonese Patriotic Front	148	4.88		
Libreville 2nd Arrondissement, 1st	Independent	134	4.42		
Libreville 2nd Arrondissement, 1st	The Democrats–Rally for Gabon	131	4.32		
Libreville 2nd Arrondissement, 1st	Rally for Democracy and Progress	72	2.37		
Libreville 2nd Arrondissement, 1st	Valid votes	3,035	89.29	1,591	95.56
Libreville 2nd Arrondissement, 1st	Invalid/blank votes	364	10.71	74	4.44
Libreville 2nd Arrondissement, 1st	Total votes	3,399	100	1,665	100
Libreville 2nd Arrondissement, 1st	Registered voters/turnout	10,800	31.47	10,800	15.42
Libreville 2nd Arrondissement, 2nd	Democratic Union of Builders	964	24.12	983	47.33
Libreville 2nd Arrondissement, 2nd	Rally for the Fatherland and Modernity	643	16.09	1,094	52.67
Libreville 2nd Arrondissement, 2nd	Independent	481	12.04		
Libreville 2nd Arrondissement, 2nd	Democratic Socialist Front	357	8.93		
Libreville 2nd Arrondissement, 2nd	Gabonese Democratic Party	340	8.51		
Libreville 2nd Arrondissement, 2nd	Patriotic Alliance	320	8.01		
Libreville 2nd Arrondissement, 2nd	The Democrats–Rally for Gabon	313	7.83		
Libreville 2nd Arrondissement, 2nd	Independent	215	5.38		
Libreville 2nd Arrondissement, 2nd	Gabonese Patriotic Front	147	3.68		
Libreville 2nd Arrondissement, 2nd	Independent	112	2.80		
Libreville 2nd Arrondissement, 2nd	Citizen Awakening Party	104	2.60		
Libreville 2nd Arrondissement, 2nd	Valid votes	3,996	88.50	2,077	96.16
Libreville 2nd Arrondissement, 2nd	Invalid/blank votes	519	11.50	83	3.84
Libreville 2nd Arrondissement, 2nd	Total votes	4,515	100	2,160	100
Libreville 2nd Arrondissement, 2nd	Registered voters/turnout	13,237	34.11	13,239	16.32
Libreville 3rd Arrondissement, 1st	Democratic Union of Builders	4,901	68.81		
Libreville 3rd Arrondissement, 1st	Gabonese Democratic Party	773	10.85		
Libreville 3rd Arrondissement, 1st	Union for the Republic	326	4.58		
Libreville 3rd Arrondissement, 1st	Independent	311	4.37		
Libreville 3rd Arrondissement, 1st	Rally for the Fatherland and Modernity	298	4.18		
Libreville 3rd Arrondissement, 1st	Circle of Liberal Reformers	261	3.66		
Libreville 3rd Arrondissement, 1st	Independent	253	3.55		
Libreville 3rd Arrondissement, 1st	Valid votes	7,123	86.21		
Libreville 3rd Arrondissement, 1st	Invalid/blank votes	1,139	13.79		
Libreville 3rd Arrondissement, 1st	Total votes	8,262	100		
Libreville 3rd Arrondissement, 1st	Registered voters/turnout	20,864	39.60		
Libreville 3rd Arrondissement, 2nd	Democratic Union of Builders	1,042	33.71	2,582	61.90
Libreville 3rd Arrondissement, 2nd	Independent	478	15.46	1,589	38.10
Libreville 3rd Arrondissement, 2nd	Gabonese Democratic Party	387	12.52		
Libreville 3rd Arrondissement, 2nd	Independent	207	6.70		
Libreville 3rd Arrondissement, 2nd	Independent Centre Party of Gabon	148	4.79		
Libreville 3rd Arrondissement, 2nd	Independent	139	4.50		
Libreville 3rd Arrondissement, 2nd	Union for the Republic	133	4.30		
Libreville 3rd Arrondissement, 2nd	Independent	117	3.79		
Libreville 3rd Arrondissement, 2nd	Circle of Liberal Reformers	114	3.69		
Libreville 3rd Arrondissement, 2nd	Independent	107	3.46		
Libreville 3rd Arrondissement, 2nd	National Union	100	3.24		
Libreville 3rd Arrondissement, 2nd	National Party for Work and Progress	72	2.33		
Libreville 3rd Arrondissement, 2nd	Independent	47	1.52		
Libreville 3rd Arrondissement, 2nd	Valid votes	3,091	85.48	4,171	96.71
Libreville 3rd Arrondissement, 2nd	Invalid/blank votes	525	14.52	142	3.29
Libreville 3rd Arrondissement, 2nd	Total votes	3,616	100	4,313	100
Libreville 3rd Arrondissement, 2nd	Registered voters/turnout	11,499	31.45	22,037	19.57
Libreville 4th Arrondissement, 1st	Rally for the Fatherland and Modernity	2,651	61.97		
Libreville 4th Arrondissement, 1st	Gabonese Democratic Party	573	13.39		
Libreville 4th Arrondissement, 1st	Concerted National Coordination for Development	345	8.06		
Libreville 4th Arrondissement, 1st	Democratic Socialist Front	344	8.04		
Libreville 4th Arrondissement, 1st	Independent	184	4.30		
Libreville 4th Arrondissement, 1st	Union for the Republic	181	4.23		
Libreville 4th Arrondissement, 1st	Valid votes	4,278	77.01		
Libreville 4th Arrondissement, 1st	Invalid/blank votes	1,277	22.99		
Libreville 4th Arrondissement, 1st	Total votes	5,555	100		
Libreville 4th Arrondissement, 1st	Registered voters/turnout	16,120	34.46		
Libreville 4th Arrondissement, 2nd	Democratic Union of Builders	1,480	38.02	1,415	60.11
Libreville 4th Arrondissement, 2nd	Gabonese Democratic Party	920	23.63	939	39.89
Libreville 4th Arrondissement, 2nd	National Union	451	11.58		
Libreville 4th Arrondissement, 2nd	Independent	270	6.94		
Libreville 4th Arrondissement, 2nd	Christian Democratic Bloc	234	6.01		
Libreville 4th Arrondissement, 2nd	Independent	207	5.32		
Libreville 4th Arrondissement, 2nd	Democratic Socialist Front	193	4.96		
Libreville 4th Arrondissement, 2nd	Circle of Liberal Reformers	138	3.54		
Libreville 4th Arrondissement, 2nd	Valid votes	3,893	95.37	2,354	95.96
Libreville 4th Arrondissement, 2nd	Invalid/blank votes	189	4.63	99	4.04
Libreville 4th Arrondissement, 2nd	Total votes	4,082	100	2,453	100
Libreville 4th Arrondissement, 2nd	Registered voters/turnout	11,924	34.23	11,970	20.49
Libreville 5th Arrondissement, 1st	Democratic Union of Builders	2,664	38.54	3,389	78.20
Libreville 5th Arrondissement, 1st	Gabonese Democratic Party	642	9.29	945	21.80
Libreville 5th Arrondissement, 1st	Independent	379	5.48		
Libreville 5th Arrondissement, 1st	Circle of Liberal Reformers	362	5.24		
Libreville 5th Arrondissement, 1st	Gabonese Social Democrats	344	4.98		
Libreville 5th Arrondissement, 1st	Union for the Republic	335	4.85		
Libreville 5th Arrondissement, 1st	Independent	323	4.67		
Libreville 5th Arrondissement, 1st	Independent	285	4.12		
Libreville 5th Arrondissement, 1st	National Union	255	3.69		
Libreville 5th Arrondissement, 1st	Union of the Gabonese People	216	3.12		
Libreville 5th Arrondissement, 1st	Citizen Awakening Party	201	2.91		
Libreville 5th Arrondissement, 1st	Concerted National Coordination for Development	186	2.69		
Libreville 5th Arrondissement, 1st	The Democrats	159	2.30		
Libreville 5th Arrondissement, 1st	Union of Forces for Change	137	1.98		
Libreville 5th Arrondissement, 1st	Social Democratic Party	130	1.88		
Libreville 5th Arrondissement, 1st	Together for Gabon	124	1.79		
Libreville 5th Arrondissement, 1st	Independent	121	1.75		
Libreville 5th Arrondissement, 1st	National Party for Work and Progress	50	0.72		
Libreville 5th Arrondissement, 1st	Valid votes	6,913	85.01	4,334	94.82
Libreville 5th Arrondissement, 1st	Invalid/blank votes	1,219	14.99	237	5.18
Libreville 5th Arrondissement, 1st	Total votes	8,132	100	4,571	100
Libreville 5th Arrondissement, 1st	Registered voters/turnout	23,571	34.50	28,679	15.94
Libreville 5th Arrondissement, 2nd	Democratic Union of Builders	1,055	33.31	1,541	62.87
Libreville 5th Arrondissement, 2nd	Gabonese Democratic Party	701	22.13	910	37.13
Libreville 5th Arrondissement, 2nd	Independent	386	12.19		
Libreville 5th Arrondissement, 2nd	Independent	281	8.87		
Libreville 5th Arrondissement, 2nd	National Union	181	5.72		
Libreville 5th Arrondissement, 2nd	Union for the Republic	166	5.24		
Libreville 5th Arrondissement, 2nd	Independent	136	4.29		
Libreville 5th Arrondissement, 2nd	Gabonese Social Democrats	125	3.95		
Libreville 5th Arrondissement, 2nd	Circle of Liberal Reformers	85	2.68		
Libreville 5th Arrondissement, 2nd	Independent	51	1.61		
Libreville 5th Arrondissement, 2nd	Valid votes	3,167	88.09	2,451	96.19
Libreville 5th Arrondissement, 2nd	Invalid/blank votes	428	11.91	97	3.81
Libreville 5th Arrondissement, 2nd	Total votes	3,595	100	2,548	100
Libreville 5th Arrondissement, 2nd	Registered voters/turnout	11,439	31.43	12,415	20.52
Libreville 6th Arrondissement, 1st	Democratic Union of Builders	1,829	40.13	1,477	63.80
Libreville 6th Arrondissement, 1st	Independent	437	9.59	838	36.20
Libreville 6th Arrondissement, 1st	Gabonese Social Democrats	400	8.78		
Libreville 6th Arrondissement, 1st	Rally for the Fatherland and Modernity	359	7.88		
Libreville 6th Arrondissement, 1st	National Union	342	7.50		
Libreville 6th Arrondissement, 1st	Gabonese Democratic Party	321	7.04		
Libreville 6th Arrondissement, 1st	Patriotic Alliance	264	5.79		
Libreville 6th Arrondissement, 1st	Concerted National Coordination for Development	137	3.01		
Libreville 6th Arrondissement, 1st	National Party for Work and Progress	120	2.63		
Libreville 6th Arrondissement, 1st	Independent	119	2.61		
Libreville 6th Arrondissement, 1st	Together for Gabon	108	2.37		
Libreville 6th Arrondissement, 1st	Union for the Republic	63	1.38		
Libreville 6th Arrondissement, 1st	Democratic and Republican Alliance	59	1.29		
Libreville 6th Arrondissement, 1st	Valid votes	4,558	85.87	2,315	96.50
Libreville 6th Arrondissement, 1st	Invalid/blank votes	750	14.13	84	3.50
Libreville 6th Arrondissement, 1st	Total votes	5,308	100	2,399	100
Libreville 6th Arrondissement, 1st	Registered voters/turnout	14,081	37.70	14,081	17.04
Libreville 6th Arrondissement, 2nd	Democratic Union of Builders	2,707	32.91	1,652	56.85
Libreville 6th Arrondissement, 2nd	National Union	818	9.94	1,254	43.15
Libreville 6th Arrondissement, 2nd	Independent	780	9.48		
Libreville 6th Arrondissement, 2nd	Democratic Socialist Front	707	8.59		
Libreville 6th Arrondissement, 2nd	Gabonese Democratic Party	601	7.31		
Libreville 6th Arrondissement, 2nd	Rally for the Fatherland and Modernity	455	5.53		
Libreville 6th Arrondissement, 2nd	Together for Gabon	361	4.39		
Libreville 6th Arrondissement, 2nd	Union for the Republic	328	3.99		
Libreville 6th Arrondissement, 2nd	Union for Democracy and Social Integration	289	3.51		
Libreville 6th Arrondissement, 2nd	Gabonese Patriotic Front	264	3.21		
Libreville 6th Arrondissement, 2nd	The Democrats	257	3.12		
Libreville 6th Arrondissement, 2nd	Independent	244	2.97		
Libreville 6th Arrondissement, 2nd	Party for the Seven Wonders of the Gabonese People	221	2.69		
Libreville 6th Arrondissement, 2nd	National Party for Work and Progress	122	1.48		
Libreville 6th Arrondissement, 2nd	Social Democratic Party	72	0.88		
Libreville 6th Arrondissement, 2nd	Valid votes	8,226	84.63	2,906	95.28
Libreville 6th Arrondissement, 2nd	Invalid/blank votes	1,494	15.37	144	4.72
Libreville 6th Arrondissement, 2nd	Total votes	9,720	100	3,050	100
Libreville 6th Arrondissement, 2nd	Registered voters/turnout	28,168	34.51	28,170	10.83
D'Akanda 1st Arrondissement	Independent	1,324	29.33	2,076	61.49
D'Akanda 1st Arrondissement	Democratic Union of Builders	912	20.20	1,300	38.51
D'Akanda 1st Arrondissement	Gabonese Democratic Party	818	18.12		
D'Akanda 1st Arrondissement	Rally for the Fatherland and Modernity	377	8.35		
D'Akanda 1st Arrondissement	National Union	270	5.98		
D'Akanda 1st Arrondissement	Rally for Democracy and Progress	228	5.05		
D'Akanda 1st Arrondissement	Union for the Republic	202	4.47		
D'Akanda 1st Arrondissement	Independent	125	2.77		
D'Akanda 1st Arrondissement	Independent	110	2.44		
D'Akanda 1st Arrondissement	Independent	73	1.62		
D'Akanda 1st Arrondissement	Gabonese Democratic Party	47	1.04		
D'Akanda 1st Arrondissement	Circle of Liberal Reformers	28	0.62		
D'Akanda 1st Arrondissement	Valid votes	4,514	88.37	3,376	98.05
D'Akanda 1st Arrondissement	Invalid/blank votes	594	11.63	67	1.95
D'Akanda 1st Arrondissement	Total votes	5,108	100	3,443	100
D'Akanda 1st Arrondissement	Registered voters/turnout	12,060	42.35	12,060	28.55
D'Akanda 2nd Arrondissement	Democratic Union of Builders	1,699	22.17	1,380	36.22
D'Akanda 2nd Arrondissement	National Union	1,622	21.16	2,430	63.78
D'Akanda 2nd Arrondissement	Concerted National Coordination for Development	1,596	20.82		
D'Akanda 2nd Arrondissement	Independent	734	9.58		
D'Akanda 2nd Arrondissement	Gabonese Democratic Party	629	8.21		
D'Akanda 2nd Arrondissement	Independent	432	5.64		
D'Akanda 2nd Arrondissement	Independent Centre Party of Gabon	266	3.47		
D'Akanda 2nd Arrondissement	Rally for the Fatherland and Modernity	219	2.86		
D'Akanda 2nd Arrondissement	Independent	208	2.71		
D'Akanda 2nd Arrondissement	Circle of Liberal Reformers	154	2.01		
D'Akanda 2nd Arrondissement	Union for the Republic	106	1.38		
D'Akanda 2nd Arrondissement	Valid votes	7,665	95.41	3,810	93.02
D'Akanda 2nd Arrondissement	Invalid/blank votes	369	4.59	286	6.98
D'Akanda 2nd Arrondissement	Total votes	8,034	100	4,096	100
D'Akanda 2nd Arrondissement	Registered voters/turnout	25,855	31.07	25,855	15.84
Owendo 1st Arrondissement	Democratic Union of Builders	2,332	32.46	1,993	65.32
Owendo 1st Arrondissement	Gabonese Democratic Party	1,049	14.60	1,058	34.68
Owendo 1st Arrondissement	Independent	656	9.13		
Owendo 1st Arrondissement	National Union	533	7.42		
Owendo 1st Arrondissement	Democratic Socialist Front	520	7.24		
Owendo 1st Arrondissement	Independent	439	6.11		
Owendo 1st Arrondissement	Rally for the Fatherland and Modernity	320	4.45		
Owendo 1st Arrondissement	Gabonese Social Democrats	264	3.67		
Owendo 1st Arrondissement	Association for Socialism in Gabon	237	3.30		
Owendo 1st Arrondissement	Union for Democracy and Social Integration	232	3.23		
Owendo 1st Arrondissement	Patriotic Alliance	208	2.90		
Owendo 1st Arrondissement	Independent	204	2.84		
Owendo 1st Arrondissement	Forum for the Defense of the Republic	190	2.64		
Owendo 1st Arrondissement	Valid votes	7,184	85.93	3,051	95.20
Owendo 1st Arrondissement	Invalid/blank votes	1,176	14.07	154	4.80
Owendo 1st Arrondissement	Total votes	8,360	100	3,205	100
Owendo 1st Arrondissement	Registered voters/turnout	27,753	30.12	28,145	11.39
Owendo 2nd Arrondissement	Democratic Union of Builders	2,012	37.25	1,378	47.08
Owendo 2nd Arrondissement	Gabonese Democratic Party	1,671	30.94	1,549	52.92
Owendo 2nd Arrondissement	Independent	520	9.63		
Owendo 2nd Arrondissement	Gabonese Social Democrats	410	7.59		
Owendo 2nd Arrondissement	Democratic Socialist Front	410	7.59		
Owendo 2nd Arrondissement	Union for Democracy and Social Integration	378	7.00		
Owendo 2nd Arrondissement	Valid votes	5,401	87.13	2,927	95.68
Owendo 2nd Arrondissement	Invalid/blank votes	798	12.87	132	4.32
Owendo 2nd Arrondissement	Total votes	6,199	100	3,059	100
Owendo 2nd Arrondissement	Registered voters/turnout	17,433	35.56	17,433	17.55
Ntoum 1st Arrondissement	Gabonese Democratic Party	2,602	47.26	3,228	65.26
Ntoum 1st Arrondissement	Union for the Republic	941	17.09	1,708	34.53
Ntoum 1st Arrondissement	Democratic Union of Builders	903	16.40		
Ntoum 1st Arrondissement	National Union	764	13.88		
Ntoum 1st Arrondissement	Independent	296	5.38		
Ntoum 1st Arrondissement	Votes difference	—	—	10	0.20
Ntoum 1st Arrondissement	Valid votes	5,506	94.51	4,946	97.50
Ntoum 1st Arrondissement	Invalid/blank votes	320	5.49	127	2.50
Ntoum 1st Arrondissement	Total votes	5,826	100	5,073	100
Ntoum 1st Arrondissement	Registered voters/turnout	16,933	34.41	16,933	29.96
Ntoum 2nd Arrondissement	Independent	1,470	33.89	2,116	68.75
Ntoum 2nd Arrondissement	Democratic Union of Builders	916	21.12	962	31.25
Ntoum 2nd Arrondissement	Gabonese Patriotic Front	891	20.54		
Ntoum 2nd Arrondissement	Gabonese Democratic Party	579	13.35		
Ntoum 2nd Arrondissement	Rally for the Fatherland and Modernity	261	6.02		
Ntoum 2nd Arrondissement	Democratic Socialist Front	136	3.14		
Ntoum 2nd Arrondissement	Party for Development and Social Solidarity	85	1.96		
Ntoum 2nd Arrondissement	Valid votes	4,338	90.06	3,078	96.55
Ntoum 2nd Arrondissement	Invalid/blank votes	479	9.94	110	3.45
Ntoum 2nd Arrondissement	Total votes	4,817	100	3,188	100
Ntoum 2nd Arrondissement	Registered voters/turnout	11,050	43.59	11,050	28.85
Ntoum 3rd Arrondissement	Democratic Union of Builders	1,554	36.19	1,643	68.00
Ntoum 3rd Arrondissement	Citizen Movement of Freedom Volunteers	536	12.48	773	32.00
Ntoum 3rd Arrondissement	Union for the Republic	506	11.78		
Ntoum 3rd Arrondissement	Gabonese Democratic Party	440	10.25		
Ntoum 3rd Arrondissement	Rally for the Fatherland and Modernity	339	7.89		
Ntoum 3rd Arrondissement	Independent	229	5.33		
Ntoum 3rd Arrondissement	Independent	229	5.33		
Ntoum 3rd Arrondissement	Independent	163	3.80		
Ntoum 3rd Arrondissement	Gabonese Social Democrats	125	2.91		
Ntoum 3rd Arrondissement	Independent	102	2.38		
Ntoum 3rd Arrondissement	Together for Gabon	71	1.65		
Ntoum 3rd Arrondissement	Valid votes	4,294	100.00	2,416	96.91
Ntoum 3rd Arrondissement	Invalid/blank votes	0	0.00	77	3.09
Ntoum 3rd Arrondissement	Total votes	4,294	100	2,493	100
Ntoum 3rd Arrondissement	Registered voters/turnout	13,225	32.47	13,225	18.85
Komo-Mondah	Democratic Union of Builders	671	32.70	956	60.16
Komo-Mondah	Gabonese Democratic Party	541	26.36	633	39.84
Komo-Mondah	National Union	392	19.10		
Komo-Mondah	Union for the Republic	289	14.08		
Komo-Mondah	Rally for the Fatherland and Modernity	159	7.75		
Komo-Mondah	Valid votes	2,052	95.22	1,589	98.45
Komo-Mondah	Invalid/blank votes	103	4.78	25	1.55
Komo-Mondah	Total votes	2,155	100	1,614	100
Komo-Mondah	Registered voters/turnout	3,944	54.64	3,914	41.24
Komo-Kango, 1st	Democratic Union of Builders	1,791	57.66		
Komo-Kango, 1st	Gabonese Democratic Party	754	24.28		
Komo-Kango, 1st	Rally for Gabon	231	7.44		
Komo-Kango, 1st	Union for the Republic	203	6.54		
Komo-Kango, 1st	Democratic Socialist Front	127	4.09		
Komo-Kango, 1st	Valid votes	3,106	92.91		
Komo-Kango, 1st	Invalid/blank votes	237	7.09		
Komo-Kango, 1st	Total votes	3,343	100		
Komo-Kango, 1st	Registered voters/turnout	6,594	50.70		
Komo-Kango, 2nd	Union for the Republic	716	33.09	766	43.85
Komo-Kango, 2nd	Democratic Union of Builders	701	32.39	981	56.15
Komo-Kango, 2nd	Rally for the Fatherland and Modernity	323	14.93		
Komo-Kango, 2nd	Gabonese Democratic Party	309	14.28		
Komo-Kango, 2nd	Concerted National Coordination for Development	115	5.31		
Komo-Kango, 2nd	Valid votes	2,164	100.00	1,747	96.95
Komo-Kango, 2nd	Invalid/blank votes	0	0.00	55	3.05
Komo-Kango, 2nd	Total votes	2,164	100	1,802	100
Komo-Kango, 2nd	Registered voters/turnout	4,690	46.14	4,690	38.42
Komo-Kango, 3rd	Democratic Union of Builders	436	66.67		
Komo-Kango, 3rd	Gabonese Democratic Party	117	17.89		
Komo-Kango, 3rd	Rally for Gabon	86	13.15		
Komo-Kango, 3rd	Union for the Republic	15	2.29		
Komo-Kango, 3rd	Valid votes	654	95.34		
Komo-Kango, 3rd	Invalid/blank votes	32	4.66		
Komo-Kango, 3rd	Total votes	686	100		
Komo-Kango, 3rd	Registered voters/turnout	1,580	43.42		
Komo-Ocean	Democratic Union of Builders	764	40.86	699	45.13
Komo-Ocean	Gabonese Democratic Party	641	34.28	850	54.87
Komo-Ocean	Rally for the Fatherland and Modernity	465	24.87		
Komo-Ocean	Valid votes	1,870	92.30	1,549	96.33
Komo-Ocean	Invalid/blank votes	156	7.70	59	3.67
Komo-Ocean	Total votes	2,026	100	1,608	100
Komo-Ocean	Registered voters/turnout	5,309	38.16	5,309	30.29
La Noya, 1st	Democratic Union of Builders	588	45.97	592	53.77
La Noya, 1st	Heritage and Modernity Rally	454	35.50	509	46.23
La Noya, 1st	Gabonese Democratic Party	158	12.35		
La Noya, 1st	Party for Development and Social Solidarity	79	6.18		
La Noya, 1st	Valid votes	1,279	94.95	1,101	98.74
La Noya, 1st	Invalid/blank votes	68	5.05	14	1.26
La Noya, 1st	Total votes	1,347	100	1,115	100
La Noya, 1st	Registered voters/turnout	2,338	57.61	2,338	47.69
La Noya, 2nd	Democratic Union of Builders	657	42.20	716	56.38
La Noya, 2nd	Independent	370	23.76	554	43.62
La Noya, 2nd	Gabonese Democratic Party	337	21.64		
La Noya, 2nd	Union for the Republic	193	12.40		
La Noya, 2nd	Valid votes	1,557	93.80	1,270	98.45
La Noya, 2nd	Invalid/blank votes	103	6.20	20	1.55
La Noya, 2nd	Total votes	1,660	100	1,290	100
La Noya, 2nd	Registered voters/turnout	2,753	60.30	2,753	46.86
Mpassa, 1st	Independent	1,056	41.90	1,305	59.73
Mpassa, 1st	Gabonese Democratic Party	645	25.60	880	40.27
Mpassa, 1st	Democratic Union of Builders	332	13.17		
Mpassa, 1st	Independent	211	8.37		
Mpassa, 1st	Independent	156	6.19		
Mpassa, 1st	Independent	71	2.82		
Mpassa, 1st	Rally for the Fatherland and Modernity	49	1.94		
Mpassa, 1st	Valid votes	2,520	90.42	2,185	96.81
Mpassa, 1st	Invalid/blank votes	267	9.58	72	3.19
Mpassa, 1st	Total votes	2,787	100	2,257	100
Mpassa, 1st	Registered voters/turnout	4,391	63.47	4,391	51.40
Mpassa, 2nd	Democratic Union of Builders	825	51.15		
Mpassa, 2nd	Independent	317	19.65		
Mpassa, 2nd	Union for the Republic	250	15.50		
Mpassa, 2nd	Gabonese Democratic Party	221	13.70		
Mpassa, 2nd	Valid votes	1,613	89.76		
Mpassa, 2nd	Invalid/blank votes	184	10.24		
Mpassa, 2nd	Total votes	1,797	100		
Mpassa, 2nd	Registered voters/turnout	3,336	53.87		
Franceville 1st Arrondissement	Gabonese Democratic Party	1,276	51.06		
Franceville 1st Arrondissement	Democratic Union of Builders	1,223	48.94		
Franceville 1st Arrondissement	Valid votes	2,499	93.98		
Franceville 1st Arrondissement	Invalid/blank votes	160	6.02		
Franceville 1st Arrondissement	Total votes	2,659	100		
Franceville 1st Arrondissement	Registered voters/turnout	6,013	44.22		
Franceville 2nd Arrondissement	Democratic Union of Builders	1,939	50.83		
Franceville 2nd Arrondissement	Gabonese Democratic Party	894	23.43		
Franceville 2nd Arrondissement	Independent	305	7.99		
Franceville 2nd Arrondissement	Independent	198	5.19		
Franceville 2nd Arrondissement	Independent	154	4.04		
Franceville 2nd Arrondissement	Gabonese Democratic Renewal Party	124	3.25		
Franceville 2nd Arrondissement	Independent	80	2.10		
Franceville 2nd Arrondissement	Democratic and Republican Alliance	61	1.60		
Franceville 2nd Arrondissement	Union for the New Republic	60	1.57		
Franceville 2nd Arrondissement	Valid votes	3,815	100.00		
Franceville 2nd Arrondissement	Invalid/blank votes	0	0.00		
Franceville 2nd Arrondissement	Total votes	3,815	100		
Franceville 2nd Arrondissement	Registered voters/turnout	8,590	44.41		
Franceville 3rd Arrondissement	Gabonese Democratic Party–Democratic Union of Builders	2,438	100.00		
Franceville 3rd Arrondissement	Valid votes	2,438	69.28		
Franceville 3rd Arrondissement	Invalid/blank votes	1,081	30.72		
Franceville 3rd Arrondissement	Total votes	3,519	100		
Franceville 3rd Arrondissement	Registered voters/turnout	7,609	46.25		
Franceville 4th Arrondissement	Gabonese Democratic Party	515	23.41	1,055	62.50
Franceville 4th Arrondissement	Independent	419	19.05	633	37.50
Franceville 4th Arrondissement	Democratic Union of Builders	397	18.05		
Franceville 4th Arrondissement	Unitary Republican Dynamic	343	15.59		
Franceville 4th Arrondissement	Independent	232	10.55		
Franceville 4th Arrondissement	Independent	231	10.50		
Franceville 4th Arrondissement	Independent	63	2.86		
Franceville 4th Arrondissement	Valid votes	2,200	90.68	1,688	94.14
Franceville 4th Arrondissement	Invalid/blank votes	226	9.32	105	5.86
Franceville 4th Arrondissement	Total votes	2,426	100	1,793	100
Franceville 4th Arrondissement	Registered voters/turnout	5,875	41.29	5,757	31.14
Moanda 1st Arrondissement	Gabonese Democratic Party	2,172	41.95	2,559	50.77
Moanda 1st Arrondissement	Democratic Union of Builders	2,061	39.81	2,481	49.23
Moanda 1st Arrondissement	Independent	641	12.38		
Moanda 1st Arrondissement	Independent	303	5.85		
Moanda 1st Arrondissement	Valid votes	5,177	88.77	5,040	96.28
Moanda 1st Arrondissement	Invalid/blank votes	655	11.23	195	3.72
Moanda 1st Arrondissement	Total votes	5,832	100	5,235	100
Moanda 1st Arrondissement	Registered voters/turnout	12,837	45.43	14,141	37.02
Moanda 2nd Arrondissement	Democratic Union of Builders	2,661	66.03		
Moanda 2nd Arrondissement	Independent	647	16.05		
Moanda 2nd Arrondissement	Together for Gabon	361	8.96		
Moanda 2nd Arrondissement	Gabonese Democratic Party	228	5.66		
Moanda 2nd Arrondissement	Independent	133	3.30		
Moanda 2nd Arrondissement	Valid votes	4,030	92.64		
Moanda 2nd Arrondissement	Invalid/blank votes	320	7.36		
Moanda 2nd Arrondissement	Total votes	4,350	100		
Moanda 2nd Arrondissement	Registered voters/turnout	8,493	51.22		
Lebombi-Leyou	Democratic Union of Builders	889	44.92	1,309	53.10
Lebombi-Leyou	National Union	658	33.25	1,156	46.90
Lebombi-Leyou	Union for Democracy and Social Integration	318	16.07		
Lebombi-Leyou	Gabonese Democratic Party	114	5.76		
Lebombi-Leyou	Valid votes	1,979	94.01	2,465	98.25
Lebombi-Leyou	Invalid/blank votes	126	5.99	44	1.75
Lebombi-Leyou	Total votes	2,105	100	2,509	100
Lebombi-Leyou	Registered voters/turnout	5,454	38.60	5,494	45.67
Bayi-Brikolo	Gabonese Democratic Party	467	42.88	469	47.86
Bayi-Brikolo	Democratic Union of Builders	435	39.94	511	52.14
Bayi-Brikolo	Party for the Seven Wonders of the Gabonese People	157	14.42		
Bayi-Brikolo	Heritage and Modernity Rally	30	2.75		
Bayi-Brikolo	Valid votes	1,089	92.68	980	97.51
Bayi-Brikolo	Invalid/blank votes	86	7.32	25	2.49
Bayi-Brikolo	Total votes	1,175	100	1,005	100
Bayi-Brikolo	Registered voters/turnout	2,351	49.98	2,351	42.75
Djoue	Democratic Union of Builders	2,403	88.51		
Djoue	Gabonese Democratic Party	312	11.49		
Djoue	Valid votes	2,715	98.09		
Djoue	Invalid/blank votes	53	1.91		
Djoue	Total votes	2,768	100		
Djoue	Registered voters/turnout	3,643	75.98		
Djouori-Agnili	Democratic Union of Builders	798	42.07	1,008	51.27
Djouori-Agnili	Gabonese Democratic Party	648	34.16	958	48.73
Djouori-Agnili	Independent	374	19.72		
Djouori-Agnili	Independent	46	2.42		
Djouori-Agnili	Together for Gabon	31	1.63		
Djouori-Agnili	Valid votes	1,897	93.04	1,966	97.37
Djouori-Agnili	Invalid/blank votes	142	6.96	53	2.63
Djouori-Agnili	Total votes	2,039	100	2,019	100
Djouori-Agnili	Registered voters/turnout	3,424	59.55	3,424	58.97
Lekabi-Lewolo	Gabonese Democratic Party	1,466	53.52		
Lekabi-Lewolo	Democratic Union of Builders	1,273	46.48		
Lekabi-Lewolo	Valid votes	2,739	97.20		
Lekabi-Lewolo	Invalid/blank votes	79	2.80		
Lekabi-Lewolo	Total votes	2,818	100		
Lekabi-Lewolo	Registered voters/turnout	3,894	72.37		
Lekolo	Democratic Union of Builders	1,856	71.52		
Lekolo	Independent	297	11.45		
Lekolo	Gabonese Democratic Party	272	10.48		
Lekolo	Rally for the Fatherland and Modernity	170	6.55		
Lekolo	Valid votes	2,595	92.61		
Lekolo	Invalid/blank votes	207	7.39		
Lekolo	Total votes	2,802	100		
Lekolo	Registered voters/turnout	4,923	56.92		
Lékoni-Lékori, 1st	Cancelled				
Lékoni-Lékori, 2nd	Gabonese Democratic Party	562	52.28		
Lékoni-Lékori, 2nd	Democratic Union of Builders	478	44.47		
Lékoni-Lékori, 2nd	Together for Gabon	35	3.26		
Lékoni-Lékori, 2nd	Valid votes	1,075	93.64		
Lékoni-Lékori, 2nd	Invalid/blank votes	73	6.36		
Lékoni-Lékori, 2nd	Total votes	1,148	100		
Lékoni-Lékori, 2nd	Registered voters/turnout	2,018	56.89		
Lékoni-Lékori, 3rd	Democratic Union of Builders	546	46.87	741	50.96
Lékoni-Lékori, 3rd	Gabonese Democratic Party	507	43.52	713	49.04
Lékoni-Lékori, 3rd	Gabonese Patriotic Party	112	9.61		
Lékoni-Lékori, 3rd	Valid votes	1,165	95.65	1,454	98.58
Lékoni-Lékori, 3rd	Invalid/blank votes	53	4.35	21	1.42
Lékoni-Lékori, 3rd	Total votes	1,218	100	1,475	100
Lékoni-Lékori, 3rd	Registered voters/turnout	2,035	59.85	2,035	72.48
Ogooue-Letili, 1st	Democratic Union of Builders	937	64.40		
Ogooue-Letili, 1st	Gabonese Democratic Party	518	35.60		
Ogooue-Letili, 1st	Valid votes	1,455	95.60		
Ogooue-Letili, 1st	Invalid/blank votes	67	4.40		
Ogooue-Letili, 1st	Total votes	1,522	100		
Ogooue-Letili, 1st	Registered voters/turnout	2,812	54.13		
Plateaux, 1st	Democratic Union of Builders	1,040	46.10	1,120	53.51
Plateaux, 1st	Gabonese Democratic Party	722	32.00	973	46.49
Plateaux, 1st	Rally for the Fatherland and Modernity	239	10.59		
Plateaux, 1st	Independent	209	9.26		
Plateaux, 1st	Independent	46	2.04		
Plateaux, 1st	Valid votes	2,256	100.00	2,093	95.66
Plateaux, 1st	Invalid/blank votes	0	0.00	95	4.34
Plateaux, 1st	Total votes	2,256	100	2,188	100
Plateaux, 1st	Registered voters/turnout	3,750	60.16	3,750	58.35
Plateaux, 2nd	Democratic Union of Builders	322	44.60	390	73.86
Plateaux, 2nd	Gabonese Democratic Party	219	30.33	138	26.14
Plateaux, 2nd	Rally for the Fatherland and Modernity	181	25.07		
Plateaux, 2nd	Valid votes	722	100.00	528	97.24
Plateaux, 2nd	Invalid/blank votes	0	0.00	15	2.76
Plateaux, 2nd	Total votes	722	100	543	100
Plateaux, 2nd	Registered voters/turnout	1,321	54.66	1,321	41.11
Sebe-Brikolo, 1st	Gabonese Democratic Party–Democratic Union of Builders	1,340	62.94		
Sebe-Brikolo, 1st	Party for the Seven Wonders of the Gabonese People	407	19.12		
Sebe-Brikolo, 1st	Rally of Gabonese Awakening for Action, Restoration and Development	382	17.94		
Sebe-Brikolo, 1st	Valid votes	2,129	90.71		
Sebe-Brikolo, 1st	Invalid/blank votes	218	9.29		
Sebe-Brikolo, 1st	Total votes	2,347	100		
Sebe-Brikolo, 1st	Registered voters/turnout	4,658	50.39		
Sebe-Brikolo, 2nd	Democratic Union of Builders	708	54.59		
Sebe-Brikolo, 2nd	Gabonese Democratic Party	317	24.44		
Sebe-Brikolo, 2nd	Independent	269	20.74		
Sebe-Brikolo, 2nd	Votes difference	3	0.23		
Sebe-Brikolo, 2nd	Valid votes	1,297	93.31		
Sebe-Brikolo, 2nd	Invalid/blank votes	93	6.69		
Sebe-Brikolo, 2nd	Total votes	1,390	100		
Sebe-Brikolo, 2nd	Registered voters/turnout	2,281	60.94		
Sebe-Brikolo, 3rd	Democratic Union of Builders	1,262	64.85		
Sebe-Brikolo, 3rd	Gabonese Democratic Party	586	30.11		
Sebe-Brikolo, 3rd	Rally of Gabonese Awakening for Action, Restoration and Development	98	5.04		
Sebe-Brikolo, 3rd	Valid votes	1,946	96.24		
Sebe-Brikolo, 3rd	Invalid/blank votes	76	3.76		
Sebe-Brikolo, 3rd	Total votes	2,022	100		
Sebe-Brikolo, 3rd	Registered voters/turnout	3,053	66.23		
Lambarene 1st Arrondissement	Democratic Union of Builders	1,593	39.05	1,919	47.93
Lambarene 1st Arrondissement	Gabonese Democratic Party	1,538	37.71	2,085	52.07
Lambarene 1st Arrondissement	Union for the Republic	590	14.46		
Lambarene 1st Arrondissement	Progressive Socialist Union	358	8.78		
Lambarene 1st Arrondissement	Valid votes	4,079	91.93	4,004	97.33
Lambarene 1st Arrondissement	Invalid/blank votes	358	8.07	110	2.67
Lambarene 1st Arrondissement	Total votes	4,437	100	4,114	100
Lambarene 1st Arrondissement	Registered voters/turnout	10,857	40.87	10,857	37.89
Lambarene 2nd Arrondissement	Gabonese Democratic Party–Democratic Union of Builders	2,513	56.50		
Lambarene 2nd Arrondissement	The Democrats	755	16.97		
Lambarene 2nd Arrondissement	National Party for Work and Progress	415	9.33		
Lambarene 2nd Arrondissement	Independent	406	9.13		
Lambarene 2nd Arrondissement	Union for the Republic	359	8.07		
Lambarene 2nd Arrondissement	Valid votes	4,448	87.89		
Lambarene 2nd Arrondissement	Invalid/blank votes	613	12.11		
Lambarene 2nd Arrondissement	Total votes	5,061	100		
Lambarene 2nd Arrondissement	Registered voters/turnout	11,347	44.60		
Ogooue et de Lacs, 1st	Gabonese Democratic Party	1,041	49.45	1,362	61.74
Ogooue et de Lacs, 1st	Democratic Union of Builders	559	26.56	844	38.26
Ogooue et de Lacs, 1st	Rally for the Fatherland and Modernity	272	12.92		
Ogooue et de Lacs, 1st	Union for the Republic	155	7.36		
Ogooue et de Lacs, 1st	Citizen Awakening Party	38	1.81		
Ogooue et de Lacs, 1st	Democratic Socialist Front	32	1.52		
Ogooue et de Lacs, 1st	National Party for Work and Progress	8	0.38		
Ogooue et de Lacs, 1st	Valid votes	2,105	100.00	2,206	97.57
Ogooue et de Lacs, 1st	Invalid/blank votes	0	0.00	55	2.43
Ogooue et de Lacs, 1st	Total votes	2,105	100	2,261	100
Ogooue et de Lacs, 1st	Registered voters/turnout	4,019	52.38	4,020	56.24
Ogooue et de Lacs, 2nd	Gabonese Democratic Party–Democratic Union of Builders	1,374	83.37		
Ogooue et de Lacs, 2nd	Progressive Socialist Union	274	16.63		
Ogooue et de Lacs, 2nd	Valid votes	1,648	100.00		
Ogooue et de Lacs, 2nd	Invalid/blank votes	0	0.00		
Ogooue et de Lacs, 2nd	Total votes	1,648	100		
Ogooue et de Lacs, 2nd	Registered voters/turnout	2,288	72.03		
Ogooue et de Lacs, 3rd	Democratic Union of Builders	380	44.65	365	54.89
Ogooue et de Lacs, 3rd	Gabonese Democratic Party	162	19.04	300	45.11
Ogooue et de Lacs, 3rd	Rally for the Fatherland and Modernity	127	14.92		
Ogooue et de Lacs, 3rd	Gabonese Social Democrats	95	11.16		
Ogooue et de Lacs, 3rd	Independent	83	9.75		
Ogooue et de Lacs, 3rd	Rally for the New Republic	4	0.47		
Ogooue et de Lacs, 3rd	Valid votes	851	100.00	665	96.52
Ogooue et de Lacs, 3rd	Invalid/blank votes	0	0.00	24	3.48
Ogooue et de Lacs, 3rd	Total votes	851	100	689	100
Ogooue et de Lacs, 3rd	Registered voters/turnout	923	92.20	1,655	41.63
Ogooue et de Lacs, 4th	Democratic Union of Builders	429	36.51	595	55.66
Ogooue et de Lacs, 4th	Rally for the Fatherland and Modernity	404	34.38	474	44.34
Ogooue et de Lacs, 4th	Gabonese Democratic Party	312	26.55		
Ogooue et de Lacs, 4th	Rally for Gabon	30	2.55		
Ogooue et de Lacs, 4th	Valid votes	1,175	100.00	1,069	97.54
Ogooue et de Lacs, 4th	Invalid/blank votes	0	0.00	27	2.46
Ogooue et de Lacs, 4th	Total votes	1,175	100	1,096	100
Ogooue et de Lacs, 4th	Registered voters/turnout	2,449	47.98	2,449	44.75
Ogooue et de Lacs, 5th	Democratic Union of Builders	772	51.95		
Ogooue et de Lacs, 5th	Gabonese Democratic Party	294	19.78		
Ogooue et de Lacs, 5th	Social Democratic Party	204	13.73		
Ogooue et de Lacs, 5th	Party for Development and Social Solidarity	180	12.11		
Ogooue et de Lacs, 5th	Democratic Socialist Front	36	2.42		
Ogooue et de Lacs, 5th	Valid votes	1,486	91.28		
Ogooue et de Lacs, 5th	Invalid/blank votes	142	8.72		
Ogooue et de Lacs, 5th	Total votes	1,628	100		
Ogooue et de Lacs, 5th	Registered voters/turnout	2,847	57.18		
Abanga-Bigne, 1st	Democratic Union of Builders	2,074	74.55		
Abanga-Bigne, 1st	Gabonese Socialist Party	437	15.71		
Abanga-Bigne, 1st	Union for the Republic	271	9.74		
Abanga-Bigne, 1st	Valid votes	2,782	94.15		
Abanga-Bigne, 1st	Invalid/blank votes	173	5.85		
Abanga-Bigne, 1st	Total votes	2,955	100		
Abanga-Bigne, 1st	Registered voters/turnout	6,382	46.30		
Abanga-Bigne, 2nd	Gabonese Democratic Party	853	55.03		
Abanga-Bigne, 2nd	Democratic Union of Builders	371	23.94		
Abanga-Bigne, 2nd	Gabonese Patriotic Front	127	8.19		
Abanga-Bigne, 2nd	Independent	106	6.84		
Abanga-Bigne, 2nd	Circle of Liberal Reformers	48	3.10		
Abanga-Bigne, 2nd	Civic Conscience and Action	45	2.90		
Abanga-Bigne, 2nd	Valid votes	1,550	92.26		
Abanga-Bigne, 2nd	Invalid/blank votes	130	7.74		
Abanga-Bigne, 2nd	Total votes	1,680	100		
Abanga-Bigne, 2nd	Registered voters/turnout	2,872	58.50		
Abanga-Bigne, 3rd	Union for the Republic	494	58.67		
Abanga-Bigne, 3rd	Democratic Union of Builders	221	26.25		
Abanga-Bigne, 3rd	Rally for the Fatherland and Modernity	78	9.26		
Abanga-Bigne, 3rd	Gabonese Democratic Party	49	5.82		
Abanga-Bigne, 3rd	Valid votes	842	97.00		
Abanga-Bigne, 3rd	Invalid/blank votes	26	3.00		
Abanga-Bigne, 3rd	Total votes	868	100		
Abanga-Bigne, 3rd	Registered voters/turnout	1,552	55.93		
Mouila 1st Arrondissement	Democratic Union of Builders	2,031	40.28	2,937	70.41
Mouila 1st Arrondissement	Gabonese Democratic Party	1,100	21.82	1,234	29.59
Mouila 1st Arrondissement	Social Democratic Party	759	15.05		
Mouila 1st Arrondissement	Democratic and Republican Alliance	340	6.74		
Mouila 1st Arrondissement	Independent	297	5.89		
Mouila 1st Arrondissement	Together for Gabon	171	3.39		
Mouila 1st Arrondissement	Party for the Seven Wonders of the Gabonese People	147	2.92		
Mouila 1st Arrondissement	Independent	102	2.02		
Mouila 1st Arrondissement	Gabonese Social Democrats	95	1.88		
Mouila 1st Arrondissement	Valid votes	5,042	86.90	4,171	94.90
Mouila 1st Arrondissement	Invalid/blank votes	760	13.10	224	5.10
Mouila 1st Arrondissement	Total votes	5,802	100	4,395	100
Mouila 1st Arrondissement	Registered voters/turnout	12,515	46.36	12,515	35.12
Mouila 2nd Arrondissement	Democratic Union of Builders	929	29.23	1,221	56.24
Mouila 2nd Arrondissement	Independent	915	28.79	950	43.76
Mouila 2nd Arrondissement	Gabonese Democratic Party	553	17.40		
Mouila 2nd Arrondissement	Gabonese Social Democrats	159	5.00		
Mouila 2nd Arrondissement	Union for the Republic	138	4.34		
Mouila 2nd Arrondissement	Social Democratic Party	137	4.31		
Mouila 2nd Arrondissement	National Union	135	4.25		
Mouila 2nd Arrondissement	Independent	98	3.08		
Mouila 2nd Arrondissement	Democratic Socialist Front	84	2.64		
Mouila 2nd Arrondissement	Votes difference	30	0.94		
Mouila 2nd Arrondissement	Valid votes	3,178	88.67	2,171	96.66
Mouila 2nd Arrondissement	Invalid/blank votes	406	11.33	75	3.34
Mouila 2nd Arrondissement	Total votes	3,584	100	2,246	100
Mouila 2nd Arrondissement	Registered voters/turnout	7,370	48.63	7,370	30.47
Douya Onoye, 1st	Democratic Union of Builders	383	39.73	513	54.11
Douya Onoye, 1st	Gabonese Democratic Party	316	32.78	435	45.89
Douya Onoye, 1st	Gabonese Patriotic Party	97	10.06		
Douya Onoye, 1st	Gabonese Social Democrats	95	9.85		
Douya Onoye, 1st	Social Democratic Party	73	7.57		
Douya Onoye, 1st	Valid votes	964	95.45	948	97.73
Douya Onoye, 1st	Invalid/blank votes	46	4.55	22	2.27
Douya Onoye, 1st	Total votes	1,010	100	970	100
Douya Onoye, 1st	Registered voters/turnout	1,760	57.39	1,760	55.11
Douya Onoye, 2nd	Democratic Union of Builders	404	57.39		
Douya Onoye, 2nd	Gabonese Democratic Party	229	32.53		
Douya Onoye, 2nd	Social Democratic Party	71	10.09		
Douya Onoye, 2nd	Valid votes	704	93.99		
Douya Onoye, 2nd	Invalid/blank votes	45	6.01		
Douya Onoye, 2nd	Total votes	749	100		
Douya Onoye, 2nd	Registered voters/turnout	1,495	50.10		
Douya Onoye, 3rd	Social Democratic Party	884	59.17		
Douya Onoye, 3rd	Democratic Union of Builders	505	33.80		
Douya Onoye, 3rd	Gabonese Democratic Party	86	5.76		
Douya Onoye, 3rd	Together for Gabon	19	1.27		
Douya Onoye, 3rd	Valid votes	1,494	94.32		
Douya Onoye, 3rd	Invalid/blank votes	90	5.68		
Douya Onoye, 3rd	Total votes	1,584	100		
Douya Onoye, 3rd	Registered voters/turnout	2,597	60.99		
Mougalaba	Democratic Union of Builders	979	61.00		
Mougalaba	Gabonese Democratic Party	472	29.41		
Mougalaba	Gabonese Patriotic Party	118	7.35		
Mougalaba	Social Democratic Party	36	2.24		
Mougalaba	Valid votes	1,605	92.83		
Mougalaba	Invalid/blank votes	124	7.17		
Mougalaba	Total votes	1,729	100		
Mougalaba	Registered voters/turnout	3,205	53.95		
Tsamba-Magotsi, 1st	Democratic Union of Builders	2,258	49.82	2,376	58.78
Tsamba-Magotsi, 1st	Rally for the Fatherland and Modernity	1,029	22.71	1,666	41.22
Tsamba-Magotsi, 1st	Gabonese Democratic Party	672	14.83		
Tsamba-Magotsi, 1st	Independent	374	8.25		
Tsamba-Magotsi, 1st	Together for Gabon	68	1.50		
Tsamba-Magotsi, 1st	Social Democratic Party	67	1.48		
Tsamba-Magotsi, 1st	Union for the Republic	64	1.41		
Tsamba-Magotsi, 1st	Valid votes	4,532	91.50	4,042	96.65
Tsamba-Magotsi, 1st	Invalid/blank votes	421	8.50	140	3.35
Tsamba-Magotsi, 1st	Total votes	4,953	100	4,182	100
Tsamba-Magotsi, 1st	Registered voters/turnout	9,417	52.60	9,418	44.40
Tsamba-Magotsi, 2nd	Independent	469	37.28	716	55.76
Tsamba-Magotsi, 2nd	Gabonese Democratic Party	376	29.89	568	44.24
Tsamba-Magotsi, 2nd	Democratic Union of Builders	330	26.23		
Tsamba-Magotsi, 2nd	Rally for the Fatherland and Modernity	83	6.60		
Tsamba-Magotsi, 2nd	Valid votes	1,258	91.42	1,284	96.69
Tsamba-Magotsi, 2nd	Invalid/blank votes	118	8.58	44	3.31
Tsamba-Magotsi, 2nd	Total votes	1,376	100	1,328	100
Tsamba-Magotsi, 2nd	Registered voters/turnout	2,526	54.47	2,526	52.57
La Boumi-Louétsi, 1st	Democratic Union of Builders	868	38.31	985	54.51
La Boumi-Louétsi, 1st	Gabonese Democratic Party	618	27.27	822	45.49
La Boumi-Louétsi, 1st	Independent	566	24.98		
La Boumi-Louétsi, 1st	Gabonese Social Democrats	214	9.44		
La Boumi-Louétsi, 1st	Valid votes	2,266	94.69	1,807	98.37
La Boumi-Louétsi, 1st	Invalid/blank votes	127	5.31	30	1.63
La Boumi-Louétsi, 1st	Total votes	2,393	100	1,837	100
La Boumi-Louétsi, 1st	Registered voters/turnout	4,182	57.22	4,182	43.93
La Boumi-Louétsi, 2nd	Democratic Union of Builders	1,168	64.85		
La Boumi-Louétsi, 2nd	Gabonese Democratic Party	553	30.71		
La Boumi-Louétsi, 2nd	Gabonese Social Democrats	80	4.44		
La Boumi-Louétsi, 2nd	Valid votes	1,801	95.29		
La Boumi-Louétsi, 2nd	Invalid/blank votes	89	4.71		
La Boumi-Louétsi, 2nd	Total votes	1,890	100		
La Boumi-Louétsi, 2nd	Registered voters/turnout	3,487	54.20		
La Boumi-Louétsi, 3rd	Democratic Union of Builders	287	27.41	490	46.85
La Boumi-Louétsi, 3rd	National Union	272	25.98	556	53.15
La Boumi-Louétsi, 3rd	Rally for the Fatherland and Modernity	213	20.34		
La Boumi-Louétsi, 3rd	Gabonese Democratic Party	156	14.90		
La Boumi-Louétsi, 3rd	Gabonese Social Democrats	100	9.55		
La Boumi-Louétsi, 3rd	Independent	19	1.81		
La Boumi-Louétsi, 3rd	Valid votes	1,047	94.58	1,046	96.41
La Boumi-Louétsi, 3rd	Invalid/blank votes	60	5.42	39	3.59
La Boumi-Louétsi, 3rd	Total votes	1,107	100	1,085	100
La Boumi-Louétsi, 3rd	Registered voters/turnout	2,247	49.27	2,247	48.29
Ogoulou, 1st	Rally for the Fatherland and Modernity	559	29.48	776	48.23
Ogoulou, 1st	Democratic Union of Builders	473	24.95	833	51.77
Ogoulou, 1st	Gabonese Democratic Party	437	23.05		
Ogoulou, 1st	Large Rainbow Rally	265	13.98		
Ogoulou, 1st	Gabonese Social Democrats	77	4.06		
Ogoulou, 1st	Independent	45	2.37		
Ogoulou, 1st	Social Democratic Party	40	2.11		
Ogoulou, 1st	Valid votes	1,896	93.40	1,609	98.47
Ogoulou, 1st	Invalid/blank votes	134	6.60	25	1.53
Ogoulou, 1st	Total votes	2,030	100	1,634	100
Ogoulou, 1st	Registered voters/turnout	3,717	54.61	3,717	43.96
Ogoulou, 2nd	Democratic Union of Builders	707	40.54	1,179	68.99
Ogoulou, 2nd	Gabonese Democratic Party	511	29.30	530	31.01
Ogoulou, 2nd	Gabonese Patriotic Party	307	17.60		
Ogoulou, 2nd	Rally for the Fatherland and Modernity	194	11.12		
Ogoulou, 2nd	Party for the Seven Wonders of the Gabonese People	25	1.43		
Ogoulou, 2nd	Valid votes	1,744	92.62	1,709	97.77
Ogoulou, 2nd	Invalid/blank votes	139	7.38	39	2.23
Ogoulou, 2nd	Total votes	1,883	100	1,748	100
Ogoulou, 2nd	Registered voters/turnout	3,235	58.21	3,235	54.03
Ndolou, 1st	Gabonese Democratic Party	1,338	49.30	1,427	50.50
Ndolou, 1st	Democratic Union of Builders	1,275	46.98	1,399	49.50
Ndolou, 1st	Party for the Seven Wonders of the Gabonese People	71	2.62		
Ndolou, 1st	Democratic Socialist Front	30	1.11		
Ndolou, 1st	Votes difference	—	—	-112	-4.13
Ndolou, 1st	Valid votes	2,714	95.93	2,714	95.93
Ndolou, 1st	Invalid/blank votes	115	4.07	115	4.07
Ndolou, 1st	Total votes	2,829	100	2,829	100
Ndolou, 1st	Registered voters/turnout	5,044	56.09	5,044	56.09
Ndolou, 2nd	Democratic Union of Builders	608	63.93		
Ndolou, 2nd	Gabonese Democratic Party	293	30.81		
Ndolou, 2nd	Independent	47	4.94		
Ndolou, 2nd	Party for the Seven Wonders of the Gabonese People	3	0.32		
Ndolou, 2nd	Valid votes	951	95.77		
Ndolou, 2nd	Invalid/blank votes	42	4.23		
Ndolou, 2nd	Total votes	993	100		
Ndolou, 2nd	Registered voters/turnout	1,551	64.02		
Dola	Democratic Union of Builders	4,056	66.97		
Dola	Gabonese Democratic Party	2,000	33.03		
Dola	Valid votes	6,056	95.58		
Dola	Invalid/blank votes	280	4.42		
Dola	Total votes	6,336	100		
Dola	Registered voters/turnout	10,437	60.71		
Louetsi-Wano	Rally for the Fatherland and Modernity	2,116	49.44	1,555	39.42
Louetsi-Wano	Democratic Union of Builders	2,038	47.62	2,390	60.58
Louetsi-Wano	Together for Gabon	126	2.94		
Louetsi-Wano	Valid votes	4,280	93.06	3,945	97.62
Louetsi-Wano	Invalid/blank votes	319	6.94	96	2.38
Louetsi-Wano	Total votes	4,599	100	4,041	100
Louetsi-Wano	Registered voters/turnout	7,596	60.55	7,596	53.20
Louetsi-Bibaka	Democratic Union of Builders	1,248	55.34		
Louetsi-Bibaka	The Democrats	738	32.73		
Louetsi-Bibaka	Gabonese Democratic Party	237	10.51		
Louetsi-Bibaka	ADERE–Gabonese Patriotic Party–Gabonese Patriotic Front–UPNR	32	1.42		
Louetsi-Bibaka	Valid votes	2,255	96.33		
Louetsi-Bibaka	Invalid/blank votes	86	3.67		
Louetsi-Bibaka	Total votes	2,341	100		
Louetsi-Bibaka	Registered voters/turnout	4,177	56.05		
Tchibanga 1st Arrondissement	Democratic Union of Builders	1,064	35.23	1,416	48.98
Tchibanga 1st Arrondissement	Gabonese Social Democrats	627	20.76	1,475	51.02
Tchibanga 1st Arrondissement	Rally for the Fatherland and Modernity	433	14.34		
Tchibanga 1st Arrondissement	Gabonese Democratic Party	279	9.24		
Tchibanga 1st Arrondissement	Democratic and Republican Alliance	186	6.16		
Tchibanga 1st Arrondissement	Union for the Republic	150	4.97		
Tchibanga 1st Arrondissement	Independent	113	3.74		
Tchibanga 1st Arrondissement	Patriotic Alliance	84	2.78		
Tchibanga 1st Arrondissement	Together for Gabon	68	2.25		
Tchibanga 1st Arrondissement	Social Democratic Party	16	0.53		
Tchibanga 1st Arrondissement	Valid votes	3,020	100.00	2,891	98.33
Tchibanga 1st Arrondissement	Invalid/blank votes	0	0.00	49	1.67
Tchibanga 1st Arrondissement	Total votes	3,020	100	2,940	100
Tchibanga 1st Arrondissement	Registered voters/turnout	7,794	38.75	7,794	37.72
Tchibanga 2nd Arrondissement	Democratic Union of Builders	1,538	66.18		
Tchibanga 2nd Arrondissement	Democratic Socialist Front	260	11.19		
Tchibanga 2nd Arrondissement	Gabonese Democratic Party	153	6.58		
Tchibanga 2nd Arrondissement	Union for the Republic	152	6.54		
Tchibanga 2nd Arrondissement	Independent	147	6.33		
Tchibanga 2nd Arrondissement	Union for the New Republic	55	2.37		
Tchibanga 2nd Arrondissement	Social Democratic Party	19	0.82		
Tchibanga 2nd Arrondissement	Valid votes	2,324	90.89		
Tchibanga 2nd Arrondissement	Invalid/blank votes	233	9.11		
Tchibanga 2nd Arrondissement	Total votes	2,557	100		
Tchibanga 2nd Arrondissement	Registered voters/turnout	5,423	47.15		
Mougotsi, 1st	Democratic Union of Builders	546	49.23	642	68.66
Mougotsi, 1st	Gabonese Democratic Party	316	28.49	293	31.34
Mougotsi, 1st	Rally for the Fatherland and Modernity	225	20.29		
Mougotsi, 1st	Democratic and Republican Alliance	22	1.98		
Mougotsi, 1st	Valid votes	1,109	95.77	935	98.52
Mougotsi, 1st	Invalid/blank votes	49	4.23	14	1.48
Mougotsi, 1st	Total votes	1,158	100	949	100
Mougotsi, 1st	Registered voters/turnout	2,289	50.59	2,289	41.46
Mougotsi, 2nd	Democratic Union of Builders	976	68.54		
Mougotsi, 2nd	Gabonese Democratic Party	240	16.85		
Mougotsi, 2nd	Rally for the Fatherland and Modernity	158	11.10		
Mougotsi, 2nd	Independent	30	2.11		
Mougotsi, 2nd	Union for the Republic	20	1.40		
Mougotsi, 2nd	Valid votes	1,424	97.40		
Mougotsi, 2nd	Invalid/blank votes	38	2.60		
Mougotsi, 2nd	Total votes	1,462	100		
Mougotsi, 2nd	Registered voters/turnout	2,093	69.85		
Douigny, 1st	Independent	935	48.90	1,148	60.04
Douigny, 1st	Democratic Union of Builders	740	38.70	871	45.55
Douigny, 1st	Gabonese Democratic Party	131	6.85		
Douigny, 1st	Rally for the New Republic	86	4.50		
Douigny, 1st	Independent	20	1.05		
Douigny, 1st	Valid votes	1,912	95.94	2,019	98.73
Douigny, 1st	Invalid/blank votes	81	4.06	26	1.27
Douigny, 1st	Total votes	1,993	100	2,045	100
Douigny, 1st	Registered voters/turnout	4,544	43.86	4,544	45.00
Douigny, 2nd	Democratic Union of Builders	827	62.60		
Douigny, 2nd	Gabonese Democratic Party	494	37.40		
Douigny, 2nd	Valid votes	1,321	94.42		
Douigny, 2nd	Invalid/blank votes	78	5.58		
Douigny, 2nd	Total votes	1,399	100		
Douigny, 2nd	Registered voters/turnout	3,171	44.12		
Basse-Banio, 1st	Democratic Union of Builders	964	56.67		
Basse-Banio, 1st	Independent	283	16.64		
Basse-Banio, 1st	Gabonese Democratic Party	151	8.88		
Basse-Banio, 1st	Independent	101	5.94		
Basse-Banio, 1st	Independent	101	5.94		
Basse-Banio, 1st	Gabonese Social Democrats	101	5.94		
Basse-Banio, 1st	Valid votes	1,701	95.45		
Basse-Banio, 1st	Invalid/blank votes	81	4.55		
Basse-Banio, 1st	Total votes	1,782	100		
Basse-Banio, 1st	Registered voters/turnout	3,948	45.14		
Basse-Banio, 2nd	Democratic Union of Builders	629	34.41	156	13.79
Basse-Banio, 2nd	Gabonese Democratic Party	568	31.07	975	86.21
Basse-Banio, 2nd	Independent	294	16.08		
Basse-Banio, 2nd	The Democrats	202	11.05		
Basse-Banio, 2nd	Civic Conscience and Action	88	4.81		
Basse-Banio, 2nd	Democratic and Republican Alliance	47	2.57		
Basse-Banio, 2nd	Valid votes	1,828	93.41	1,131	93.63
Basse-Banio, 2nd	Invalid/blank votes	129	6.59	77	6.37
Basse-Banio, 2nd	Total votes	1,957	100	1,208	100
Basse-Banio, 2nd	Registered voters/turnout	3,384	57.83	3,384	35.70
Haute-Banio	Gabonese Democratic Party	400	52.22		
Haute-Banio	Democratic Union of Builders	183	23.89		
Haute-Banio	Rally for the Fatherland and Modernity	107	13.97		
Haute-Banio	Party for Development and Social Solidarity	76	9.92		
Haute-Banio	Valid votes	766	95.99		
Haute-Banio	Invalid/blank votes	32	4.01		
Haute-Banio	Total votes	798	100		
Haute-Banio	Registered voters/turnout	1,339	59.60		
Doutsila	Democratic Union of Builders	723	45.99	947	78.14
Doutsila	Gabonese Democratic Party	235	14.95	265	21.86
Doutsila	Rally for the Fatherland and Modernity	227	14.44		
Doutsila	Rally of Gabonese Awakening for Action, Restoration and Development	207	13.17		
Doutsila	Union for the Republic	126	8.02		
Doutsila	Gabonese Social Democrats	54	3.44		
Doutsila	Valid votes	1,572	92.91	1,212	97.82
Doutsila	Invalid/blank votes	120	7.09	27	2.18
Doutsila	Total votes	1,692	100	1,239	100
Doutsila	Registered voters/turnout	3,193	52.99	3,193	38.80
Mongo	Democratic Union of Builders	725	38.40	1,006	57.42
Mongo	Gabonese Democratic Party	629	33.32	746	42.58
Mongo	Gabonese Socialist Union	328	17.37		
Mongo	Rally for the Fatherland and Modernity	169	8.95		
Mongo	Circle of Liberal Reformers	26	1.38		
Mongo	Social Democratic Party	11	0.58		
Mongo	Valid votes	1,888	100.00	1,752	98.21
Mongo	Invalid/blank votes	0	0.00	32	1.79
Mongo	Total votes	1,888	100	1,784	100
Mongo	Registered voters/turnout	3,182	59.33	3,182	56.07
Makokou 1st Arrondissement	Democratic Union of Builders	1,133	34.22	1,452	55.46
Makokou 1st Arrondissement	National Union	581	17.55	1,166	44.54
Makokou 1st Arrondissement	Gabonese Democratic Party	478	14.44		
Makokou 1st Arrondissement	Patriotic Alliance	436	13.17		
Makokou 1st Arrondissement	Independent	303	9.15		
Makokou 1st Arrondissement	Rally for the Fatherland and Modernity	205	6.19		
Makokou 1st Arrondissement	Democratic Socialist Front	138	4.17		
Makokou 1st Arrondissement	Together for Gabon	37	1.12		
Makokou 1st Arrondissement	Valid votes	3,311	91.29	2,618	97.07
Makokou 1st Arrondissement	Invalid/blank votes	316	8.71	79	2.93
Makokou 1st Arrondissement	Total votes	3,627	100	2,697	100
Makokou 1st Arrondissement	Registered voters/turnout	8,676	41.80	8,674	31.09
Makokou 2nd Arrondissement	Democratic Union of Builders	1,500	50.00	1,612	90.97
Makokou 2nd Arrondissement	Together for Gabon	441	14.70	160	9.03
Makokou 2nd Arrondissement	Independent	357	11.90		
Makokou 2nd Arrondissement	Gabonese Democratic Party	276	9.20		
Makokou 2nd Arrondissement	Independent	238	7.93		
Makokou 2nd Arrondissement	Rally for Gabon	188	6.27		
Makokou 2nd Arrondissement	Valid votes	3,000	92.65	1,772	94.36
Makokou 2nd Arrondissement	Invalid/blank votes	238	7.35	106	5.64
Makokou 2nd Arrondissement	Total votes	3,238	100	1,878	100
Makokou 2nd Arrondissement	Registered voters/turnout	6,514	49.71	6,520	28.80
Ivindo, 1st	Democratic Socialist Front	421	34.71	697	60.35
Ivindo, 1st	Democratic Union of Builders	354	29.18	458	39.65
Ivindo, 1st	Gabonese Democratic Party	277	22.84		
Ivindo, 1st	Rally for the Fatherland and Modernity	103	8.49		
Ivindo, 1st	Gabonese Social Democrats	58	4.78		
Ivindo, 1st	Valid votes	1,213	94.18	1,155	98.13
Ivindo, 1st	Invalid/blank votes	75	5.82	22	1.87
Ivindo, 1st	Total votes	1,288	100	1,177	100
Ivindo, 1st	Registered voters/turnout	2,228	57.81	2,228	52.83
Ivindo, 2nd	Democratic Union of Builders	1,047	77.33		
Ivindo, 2nd	Gabonese Democratic Party	160	11.82		
Ivindo, 2nd	Democratic Socialist Front	147	10.86		
Ivindo, 2nd	Valid votes	1,354	93.19		
Ivindo, 2nd	Invalid/blank votes	99	6.81		
Ivindo, 2nd	Total votes	1,453	100		
Ivindo, 2nd	Registered voters/turnout	2,137	67.99		
Ivindo, 3rd	Democratic Union of Builders	933	43.21	1,125	55.69
Ivindo, 3rd	Gabonese Social Democrats	639	29.60	895	44.31
Ivindo, 3rd	Gabonese Democratic Party	307	14.22		
Ivindo, 3rd	Democratic Socialist Front	280	12.97		
Ivindo, 3rd	Valid votes	2,159	94.49	2,020	97.63
Ivindo, 3rd	Invalid/blank votes	126	5.51	49	2.37
Ivindo, 3rd	Total votes	2,285	100	2,069	100
Ivindo, 3rd	Registered voters/turnout	3,663	62.38	3,664	56.47
Zadie, 1st	Gabonese Democratic Party	725	39.32	749	43.78
Zadie, 1st	Rally for the Fatherland and Modernity	667	36.17	962	56.22
Zadie, 1st	Democratic Union of Builders	452	24.51		
Zadie, 1st	Valid votes	1,844	95.54	1,711	98.73
Zadie, 1st	Invalid/blank votes	86	4.46	22	1.27
Zadie, 1st	Total votes	1,930	100	1,733	100
Zadie, 1st	Registered voters/turnout	3,055	63.18	3,055	56.73
Zadie, 2nd	Democratic Union of Builders	1,025	46.63	1,185	54.06
Zadie, 2nd	Gabonese Democratic Party	869	39.54	1,007	45.94
Zadie, 2nd	Independent	304	13.83		
Zadie, 2nd	Valid votes	2,198	91.89	2,192	98.25
Zadie, 2nd	Invalid/blank votes	194	8.11	39	1.75
Zadie, 2nd	Total votes	2,392	100	2,231	100
Zadie, 2nd	Registered voters/turnout	3,624	66.00	3,620	61.63
Zadie, 3rd	Democratic Union of Builders	433	28.98	612	40.94
Zadie, 3rd	Gabonese Social Democrats	322	21.55	883	59.06
Zadie, 3rd	Gabonese Democratic Party	280	18.74		
Zadie, 3rd	The Democrats	220	14.73		
Zadie, 3rd	Together for Gabon	100	6.69		
Zadie, 3rd	Independent	81	5.42		
Zadie, 3rd	Patriotic Alliance	58	3.88		
Zadie, 3rd	Valid votes	1,494	91.54	1,495	97.27
Zadie, 3rd	Invalid/blank votes	138	8.46	42	2.73
Zadie, 3rd	Total votes	1,632	100	1,537	100
Zadie, 3rd	Registered voters/turnout	2,561	63.73	2,561	60.02
Lope, 1st	Democratic Union of Builders	1,409	53.49		
Lope, 1st	Union for the Republic	545	20.69		
Lope, 1st	Gabonese Democratic Party	360	13.67		
Lope, 1st	Rally for the Fatherland and Modernity	154	5.85		
Lope, 1st	Independent	136	5.16		
Lope, 1st	National Party for Work and Progress	30	1.14		
Lope, 1st	Valid votes	2,634	90.83		
Lope, 1st	Invalid/blank votes	266	9.17		
Lope, 1st	Total votes	2,900	100		
Lope, 1st	Registered voters/turnout	5,356	54.14		
Lope, 2nd	Democratic Union of Builders	570	38.64	639	50.79
Lope, 2nd	Independent	285	19.32	619	49.21
Lope, 2nd	National Union	230	15.59		
Lope, 2nd	Rally for the Fatherland and Modernity	178	12.07		
Lope, 2nd	Gabonese Democratic Party	145	9.83		
Lope, 2nd	The Democrats	46	3.12		
Lope, 2nd	Party for Development and Social Solidarity	21	1.42		
Lope, 2nd	Valid votes	1,475	91.90	1,258	97.29
Lope, 2nd	Invalid/blank votes	130	8.10	35	2.71
Lope, 2nd	Total votes	1,605	100	1,293	100
Lope, 2nd	Registered voters/turnout	3,069	52.30	3,059	42.27
Mvoung, 1st	Democratic Union of Builders	643	56.65		
Mvoung, 1st	Gabonese Democratic Party	189	16.65		
Mvoung, 1st	National Union	160	14.10		
Mvoung, 1st	Together for Gabon	143	12.60		
Mvoung, 1st	Valid votes	1,135	94.98		
Mvoung, 1st	Invalid/blank votes	60	5.02		
Mvoung, 1st	Total votes	1,195	100		
Mvoung, 1st	Registered voters/turnout	1,830	65.30		
Mvoung, 2nd	Democratic Union of Builders	563	51.46		
Mvoung, 2nd	Rally for Gabon	286	26.14		
Mvoung, 2nd	Gabonese Democratic Party	245	22.39		
Mvoung, 2nd	Valid votes	1,094	95.63		
Mvoung, 2nd	Invalid/blank votes	50	4.37		
Mvoung, 2nd	Total votes	1,144	100		
Mvoung, 2nd	Registered voters/turnout	2,138	53.51		
Koulamoutou 1st Arrondissement	Gabonese Democratic Party	723	39.47	1,546	66.44
Koulamoutou 1st Arrondissement	Democratic Union of Builders	608	33.19	781	33.56
Koulamoutou 1st Arrondissement	National Union	262	14.30		
Koulamoutou 1st Arrondissement	Rally for the Fatherland and Modernity	90	4.91		
Koulamoutou 1st Arrondissement	Sovereigntists–Ecologists Party	88	4.80		
Koulamoutou 1st Arrondissement	National Party for Work and Progress	61	3.33		
Koulamoutou 1st Arrondissement	Valid votes	1,832	100.00	2,327	97.90
Koulamoutou 1st Arrondissement	Invalid/blank votes	0	0.00	50	2.10
Koulamoutou 1st Arrondissement	Total votes	1,832	100	2,377	100
Koulamoutou 1st Arrondissement	Registered voters/turnout	3,684	49.73	4,108	57.86
Koulamoutou 2nd Arrondissement	Democratic Union of Builders	1,497	57.27		
Koulamoutou 2nd Arrondissement	Gabonese Democratic Party	890	34.05		
Koulamoutou 2nd Arrondissement	Rally for the Fatherland and Modernity	97	3.71		
Koulamoutou 2nd Arrondissement	Independent	87	3.33		
Koulamoutou 2nd Arrondissement	Gabonese Social Democrats	43	1.64		
Koulamoutou 2nd Arrondissement	Valid votes	2,614	100.00		
Koulamoutou 2nd Arrondissement	Invalid/blank votes	0	0.00		
Koulamoutou 2nd Arrondissement	Total votes	2,614	100		
Koulamoutou 2nd Arrondissement	Registered voters/turnout	6,459	40.47		
Lolo-Bouenguidi, 1st	Democratic Union of Builders	783	52.48		
Lolo-Bouenguidi, 1st	The Democrats	599	40.15		
Lolo-Bouenguidi, 1st	Gabonese Democratic Party	110	7.37		
Lolo-Bouenguidi, 1st	Valid votes	1,492	96.76		
Lolo-Bouenguidi, 1st	Invalid/blank votes	50	3.24		
Lolo-Bouenguidi, 1st	Total votes	1,542	100		
Lolo-Bouenguidi, 1st	Registered voters/turnout	2,608	59.13		
Lolo-Bouenguidi, 2nd	Independent	467	30.99	814	60.39
Lolo-Bouenguidi, 2nd	Democratic Union of Builders	436	28.93	534	39.61
Lolo-Bouenguidi, 2nd	Gabonese Democratic Party	275	18.25		
Lolo-Bouenguidi, 2nd	The Democrats	206	13.67		
Lolo-Bouenguidi, 2nd	Rally for the Fatherland and Modernity	123	8.16		
Lolo-Bouenguidi, 2nd	Valid votes	1,507	93.31	1,348	97.89
Lolo-Bouenguidi, 2nd	Invalid/blank votes	108	6.69	29	2.11
Lolo-Bouenguidi, 2nd	Total votes	1,615	100	1,377	100
Lolo-Bouenguidi, 2nd	Registered voters/turnout	2,740	58.94	2,740	50.26
Lolo-Bouenguidi, 3rd	Democratic Union of Builders	518	57.30		
Lolo-Bouenguidi, 3rd	Independent	260	28.76		
Lolo-Bouenguidi, 3rd	Gabonese Democratic Party	78	8.63		
Lolo-Bouenguidi, 3rd	The Democrats	48	5.31		
Lolo-Bouenguidi, 3rd	Valid votes	904	93.78		
Lolo-Bouenguidi, 3rd	Invalid/blank votes	60	6.22		
Lolo-Bouenguidi, 3rd	Total votes	964	100		
Lolo-Bouenguidi, 3rd	Registered voters/turnout	1,636	58.92		
Lomboo-Bouenguidi, 1st	Democratic Union of Builders	677	52.36		
Lomboo-Bouenguidi, 1st	Gabonese Democratic Party	616	47.64		
Lomboo-Bouenguidi, 1st	Valid votes	1,293	100.00		
Lomboo-Bouenguidi, 1st	Invalid/blank votes	0	0.00		
Lomboo-Bouenguidi, 1st	Total votes	1,293	100		
Lomboo-Bouenguidi, 1st	Registered voters/turnout	2,504	51.64		
Lomboo-Bouenguidi, 2nd	Democratic Union of Builders	404	41.82	611	69.04
Lomboo-Bouenguidi, 2nd	Gabonese Democratic Party	258	26.71	274	30.96
Lomboo-Bouenguidi, 2nd	National Union	238	24.64		
Lomboo-Bouenguidi, 2nd	Gabonese Progress Party	66	6.83		
Lomboo-Bouenguidi, 2nd	Valid votes	966	100.00	885	97.04
Lomboo-Bouenguidi, 2nd	Invalid/blank votes	0	0.00	27	2.96
Lomboo-Bouenguidi, 2nd	Total votes	966	100	912	100
Lomboo-Bouenguidi, 2nd	Registered voters/turnout	2,345	41.19	2,345	38.89
Mulundu, 1st	Democratic Union of Builders	900	43.67	1,564	61.29
Mulundu, 1st	National Union	504	24.45	988	38.71
Mulundu, 1st	Gabonese Democratic Party	237	11.50		
Mulundu, 1st	Independent	162	7.86		
Mulundu, 1st	Patriotic Alliance	154	7.47		
Mulundu, 1st	Party for Development and Social Solidarity	104	5.05		
Mulundu, 1st	Valid votes	2,061	91.76	2,552	96.70
Mulundu, 1st	Invalid/blank votes	185	8.24	87	3.30
Mulundu, 1st	Total votes	2,246	100	2,639	100
Mulundu, 1st	Registered voters/turnout	6,807	33.00	6,807	38.77
Mulundu, 2nd	Democratic Union of Builders	741	43.11	976	62.01
Mulundu, 2nd	Gabonese Democratic Party	382	22.22	598	37.99
Mulundu, 2nd	National Union	247	14.37		
Mulundu, 2nd	Independent	183	10.65		
Mulundu, 2nd	Independent	99	5.76		
Mulundu, 2nd	National Party for Work and Progress	67	3.90		
Mulundu, 2nd	Valid votes	1,719	100.00	1,574	97.70
Mulundu, 2nd	Invalid/blank votes	0	0.00	37	2.30
Mulundu, 2nd	Total votes	1,719	100	1,611	100
Mulundu, 2nd	Registered voters/turnout	3,009	57.13	3,009	53.54
Mulundu, 3rd	Democratic Union of Builders	1,322	57.91		
Mulundu, 3rd	National Union	410	17.96		
Mulundu, 3rd	National Party for Work and Progress	308	13.49		
Mulundu, 3rd	Gabonese Democratic Party	134	5.87		
Mulundu, 3rd	Gabonese Social Democrats	109	4.77		
Mulundu, 3rd	Valid votes	2,283	100.00		
Mulundu, 3rd	Invalid/blank votes	0	0.00		
Mulundu, 3rd	Total votes	2,283	100		
Mulundu, 3rd	Registered voters/turnout	4,044	56.45		
Mulundu, 4th	Gabonese Democratic Party	559	45.52	709	55.13
Mulundu, 4th	National Union	554	45.11	577	44.87
Mulundu, 4th	Democratic Union of Builders	115	9.36		
Mulundu, 4th	Valid votes	1,228	100.00	1,286	99.23
Mulundu, 4th	Invalid/blank votes	0	0.00	10	0.77
Mulundu, 4th	Total votes	1,228	100	1,296	100
Mulundu, 4th	Registered voters/turnout	2,176	56.43	2,176	59.56
Offoue-Onoye	Gabonese Democratic Party	362	21.29	652	57.24
Offoue-Onoye	Democratic Union of Builders	361	21.24	487	42.76
Offoue-Onoye	Gabonese Social Democrats	357	21.00		
Offoue-Onoye	Independent	277	16.29		
Offoue-Onoye	Rally for the Fatherland and Modernity	199	11.71		
Offoue-Onoye	National Union	144	8.47		
Offoue-Onoye	Valid votes	1,700	91.55	1,139	95.08
Offoue-Onoye	Invalid/blank votes	157	8.45	59	4.92
Offoue-Onoye	Total votes	1,857	100	1,198	100
Offoue-Onoye	Registered voters/turnout	3,080	60.29	3,038	39.43
Port-Gentil 1st Arrondissement	Democratic Union of Builders	1,549	34.52	1,294	49.03
Port-Gentil 1st Arrondissement	Independent	664	14.80	1,345	50.97
Port-Gentil 1st Arrondissement	Gabonese Democratic Party	550	12.26		
Port-Gentil 1st Arrondissement	Rally for the Fatherland and Modernity	390	8.69		
Port-Gentil 1st Arrondissement	Independent	290	6.46		
Port-Gentil 1st Arrondissement	Independent	226	5.04		
Port-Gentil 1st Arrondissement	Party for Development and Social Solidarity	225	5.01		
Port-Gentil 1st Arrondissement	National Party for Work and Progress–PGP	205	4.57		
Port-Gentil 1st Arrondissement	National Union	201	4.48		
Port-Gentil 1st Arrondissement	Rally for the New Republic	187	4.17		
Port-Gentil 1st Arrondissement	Valid votes	4,487	100.00	2,639	95.89
Port-Gentil 1st Arrondissement	Invalid/blank votes	0	0.00	113	4.11
Port-Gentil 1st Arrondissement	Total votes	4,487	100	2,752	100
Port-Gentil 1st Arrondissement	Registered voters/turnout	14,685	30.55	14,685	18.74
Port-Gentil 2nd Arrondissement	Democratic Union of Builders	1,787	33.25	2,183	63.63
Port-Gentil 2nd Arrondissement	Independent	436	8.11	1,248	36.37
Port-Gentil 2nd Arrondissement	Union of the Gabonese People	431	8.02		
Port-Gentil 2nd Arrondissement	Gabonese Democratic Party	304	5.66		
Port-Gentil 2nd Arrondissement	Independent	282	5.25		
Port-Gentil 2nd Arrondissement	Independent	251	4.67		
Port-Gentil 2nd Arrondissement	Independent	235	4.37		
Port-Gentil 2nd Arrondissement	Party for Development and Social Solidarity	229	4.26		
Port-Gentil 2nd Arrondissement	Gabonese Social Democrats	207	3.85		
Port-Gentil 2nd Arrondissement	Independent	203	3.78		
Port-Gentil 2nd Arrondissement	Independent	197	3.67		
Port-Gentil 2nd Arrondissement	Independent	172	3.20		
Port-Gentil 2nd Arrondissement	Patriotic Alliance	169	3.14		
Port-Gentil 2nd Arrondissement	Independent	169	3.14		
Port-Gentil 2nd Arrondissement	Popular Movement of the Gabonese Youth	160	2.98		
Port-Gentil 2nd Arrondissement	Independent	94	1.75		
Port-Gentil 2nd Arrondissement	Congress for Democracy and Justice	49	0.91		
Port-Gentil 2nd Arrondissement	Valid votes	5,375	88.06	3,431	96.21
Port-Gentil 2nd Arrondissement	Invalid/blank votes	729	11.94	135	3.79
Port-Gentil 2nd Arrondissement	Total votes	6,104	100	3,566	100
Port-Gentil 2nd Arrondissement	Registered voters/turnout	18,669	32.70	18,669	19.10
Port-Gentil 3rd Arrondissement	Democratic Union of Builders	3,739	56.55		
Port-Gentil 3rd Arrondissement	Independent	956	14.46		
Port-Gentil 3rd Arrondissement	Gabonese Democratic Party	654	9.89		
Port-Gentil 3rd Arrondissement	Union of the Gabonese People–Gabonese Progress Party	412	6.23		
Port-Gentil 3rd Arrondissement	Party for Development and Social Solidarity	368	5.57		
Port-Gentil 3rd Arrondissement	Independent	324	4.90		
Port-Gentil 3rd Arrondissement	Democratic Socialist Front	159	2.40		
Port-Gentil 3rd Arrondissement	Valid votes	6,612	100.00		
Port-Gentil 3rd Arrondissement	Invalid/blank votes	0	0.00		
Port-Gentil 3rd Arrondissement	Total votes	6,612	100		
Port-Gentil 3rd Arrondissement	Registered voters/turnout	17,711	37.33		
Port-Gentil 4th Arrondissement	Democratic Union of Builders	1,870	33.59	2,189	75.85
Port-Gentil 4th Arrondissement	Gabonese Democratic Party	530	9.52	697	24.15
Port-Gentil 4th Arrondissement	Union for the Republic	487	8.75		
Port-Gentil 4th Arrondissement	Rally for the Fatherland and Modernity	465	8.35		
Port-Gentil 4th Arrondissement	Rally for the New Republic	413	7.42		
Port-Gentil 4th Arrondissement	Union of the Gabonese People	348	6.25		
Port-Gentil 4th Arrondissement	Independent	263	4.72		
Port-Gentil 4th Arrondissement	Independent	260	4.67		
Port-Gentil 4th Arrondissement	Party for Development and Social Solidarity	253	4.54		
Port-Gentil 4th Arrondissement	Independent	210	3.77		
Port-Gentil 4th Arrondissement	Democratic Socialist Front	175	3.14		
Port-Gentil 4th Arrondissement	Rally for Gabon	159	2.86		
Port-Gentil 4th Arrondissement	Independent	134	2.41		
Port-Gentil 4th Arrondissement	Valid votes	5,567	88.87	2,886	94.65
Port-Gentil 4th Arrondissement	Invalid/blank votes	697	11.13	163	5.35
Port-Gentil 4th Arrondissement	Total votes	6,264	100	3,049	100
Port-Gentil 4th Arrondissement	Registered voters/turnout	18,120	34.57	18,123	16.82
Bendje, 1st	Democratic Union of Builders	647	31.87	919	54.06
Bendje, 1st	Independent	601	29.61	781	45.94
Bendje, 1st	Union for the Republic	249	12.27		
Bendje, 1st	Gabonese Democratic Party	189	9.31		
Bendje, 1st	Rally for the New Republic	189	9.31		
Bendje, 1st	Rally for the Fatherland and Modernity	79	3.89		
Bendje, 1st	Democratic Socialist Front	76	3.74		
Bendje, 1st	Valid votes	2,030	93.08	1,700	97.98
Bendje, 1st	Invalid/blank votes	151	6.92	35	2.02
Bendje, 1st	Total votes	2,181	100	1,735	100
Bendje, 1st	Registered voters/turnout	5,111	42.67	5,110	33.95
Bendje, 2nd	Democratic Union of Builders	637	43.63	853	54.30
Bendje, 2nd	Gabonese Democratic Party	471	32.26	718	45.70
Bendje, 2nd	Rally for the New Republic	266	18.22		
Bendje, 2nd	Union for the Republic	62	4.25		
Bendje, 2nd	National Union	24	1.64		
Bendje, 2nd	Valid votes	1,460	97.14	1,571	98.50
Bendje, 2nd	Invalid/blank votes	43	2.86	24	1.50
Bendje, 2nd	Total votes	1,503	100	1,595	100
Bendje, 2nd	Registered voters/turnout	2,928	51.33	2,941	54.23
Bendje, 3rd	Rally for the New Republic	363	41.87	743	74.30
Bendje, 3rd	Democratic Union of Builders	290	33.45	257	25.70
Bendje, 3rd	Gabonese Democratic Party	136	15.69		
Bendje, 3rd	Civic Conscience and Action	78	9.00		
Bendje, 3rd	Valid votes	867	90.22	1,000	99.60
Bendje, 3rd	Invalid/blank votes	94	9.78	4	0.40
Bendje, 3rd	Total votes	961	100	1,004	100
Bendje, 3rd	Registered voters/turnout	2,474	38.84	2,474	40.58
Etimboue, 1st	Democratic Union of Builders	874	68.82		
Etimboue, 1st	Gabonese Democratic Party	182	14.33		
Etimboue, 1st	National Union	141	11.10		
Etimboue, 1st	National Party for Work and Progress	73	5.75		
Etimboue, 1st	Valid votes	1,270	92.36		
Etimboue, 1st	Invalid/blank votes	105	7.64		
Etimboue, 1st	Total votes	1,375	100		
Etimboue, 1st	Registered voters/turnout	2,856	48.14		
Etimboue, 2nd	Democratic Union of Builders	523	80.83		
Etimboue, 2nd	Rally for the New Republic	101	15.61		
Etimboue, 2nd	Gabonese Democratic Party	23	3.55		
Etimboue, 2nd	Valid votes	647	96.42		
Etimboue, 2nd	Invalid/blank votes	24	3.58		
Etimboue, 2nd	Total votes	671	100		
Etimboue, 2nd	Registered voters/turnout	1,190	56.39		
Etimboue, 3rd	Independent	644	45.93	827	61.49
Etimboue, 3rd	Democratic Union of Builders	456	32.52	518	38.51
Etimboue, 3rd	National Union	178	12.70		
Etimboue, 3rd	Rally for the Fatherland and Modernity	124	8.84		
Etimboue, 3rd	Valid votes	1,402	96.23	1,345	99.04
Etimboue, 3rd	Invalid/blank votes	55	3.77	13	0.96
Etimboue, 3rd	Total votes	1,457	100	1,358	100
Etimboue, 3rd	Registered voters/turnout	2,625	55.50	2,632	51.60
Ndougou, 1st	Democratic Union of Builders	831	50.52		
Ndougou, 1st	Independent	329	20.00		
Ndougou, 1st	Rally for the Fatherland and Modernity	169	10.27		
Ndougou, 1st	Gabonese Democratic Party	159	9.67		
Ndougou, 1st	Union for the Republic	122	7.42		
Ndougou, 1st	Party for Development and Social Solidarity	35	2.13		
Ndougou, 1st	Valid votes	1,645	93.95		
Ndougou, 1st	Invalid/blank votes	106	6.05		
Ndougou, 1st	Total votes	1,751	100		
Ndougou, 1st	Registered voters/turnout	3,495	50.10		
Ndougou, 2nd	Cancelled				
Ndougou, 3rd	Democratic Union of Builders	321	62.82		
Ndougou, 3rd	Gabonese Democratic Party	128	25.05		
Ndougou, 3rd	Independent	62	12.13		
Ndougou, 3rd	Valid votes	511	97.71		
Ndougou, 3rd	Invalid/blank votes	12	2.29		
Ndougou, 3rd	Total votes	523	100		
Ndougou, 3rd	Registered voters/turnout	1,108	47.20		
Oyem 1st Arrondissement	Democratic Union of Builders	2,755	63.25		
Oyem 1st Arrondissement	Gabonese Democratic Party	544	12.49		
Oyem 1st Arrondissement	Independent	230	5.28		
Oyem 1st Arrondissement	Patriotic Alliance	217	4.98		
Oyem 1st Arrondissement	Independent	167	3.83		
Oyem 1st Arrondissement	Independent	165	3.79		
Oyem 1st Arrondissement	Union for the Republic	145	3.33		
Oyem 1st Arrondissement	Gabonese Social Democrats	133	3.05		
Oyem 1st Arrondissement	Valid votes	4,356	92.27		
Oyem 1st Arrondissement	Invalid/blank votes	365	7.73		
Oyem 1st Arrondissement	Total votes	4,721	100		
Oyem 1st Arrondissement	Registered voters/turnout	10,337	45.67		
Oyem 2nd Arrondissement	Democratic Union of Builders	3,462	68.47		
Oyem 2nd Arrondissement	Patriotic Alliance	486	9.61		
Oyem 2nd Arrondissement	Union for the Republic	400	7.91		
Oyem 2nd Arrondissement	Gabonese Democratic Party	308	6.09		
Oyem 2nd Arrondissement	Independent	159	3.14		
Oyem 2nd Arrondissement	Bloc of United Patriots	125	2.47		
Oyem 2nd Arrondissement	Independent	70	1.38		
Oyem 2nd Arrondissement	National Party for Work and Progress	46	0.91		
Oyem 2nd Arrondissement	Valid votes	5,056	91.25		
Oyem 2nd Arrondissement	Invalid/blank votes	485	8.75		
Oyem 2nd Arrondissement	Total votes	5,541	100		
Oyem 2nd Arrondissement	Registered voters/turnout	11,144	49.72		
Woleu, 1st	Democratic Union of Builders	3,471	80.38		
Woleu, 1st	Rally for Gabon–UN–LD–GDC	574	13.29		
Woleu, 1st	Gabonese Democratic Party	273	6.32		
Woleu, 1st	Valid votes	4,318	97.45		
Woleu, 1st	Invalid/blank votes	113	2.55		
Woleu, 1st	Total votes	4,431	100		
Woleu, 1st	Registered voters/turnout	5,980	74.10		
Woleu, 2nd	Democratic Union of Builders	1,020	54.60		
Woleu, 2nd	Rally for the Fatherland and Modernity	690	36.94		
Woleu, 2nd	Rally of Gabonese Awakening for Action, Restoration and Development	82	4.39		
Woleu, 2nd	Gabonese Democratic Party	45	2.41		
Woleu, 2nd	Gabonese Social Democrats	31	1.66		
Woleu, 2nd	Valid votes	1,868	96.44		
Woleu, 2nd	Invalid/blank votes	69	3.56		
Woleu, 2nd	Total votes	1,937	100		
Woleu, 2nd	Registered voters/turnout	3,002	64.52		
Woleu, 3rd	Democratic Union of Builders	3,995	85.80		
Woleu, 3rd	Patriotic Alliance	302	6.49		
Woleu, 3rd	Rally for the Fatherland and Modernity	267	5.73		
Woleu, 3rd	Gabonese Democratic Party	65	1.40		
Woleu, 3rd	Independent	27	0.58		
Woleu, 3rd	Valid votes	4,656	99.44		
Woleu, 3rd	Invalid/blank votes	26	0.56		
Woleu, 3rd	Total votes	4,682	100		
Woleu, 3rd	Registered voters/turnout	5,061	92.51		
Woleu, 4th	Democratic Union of Builders	2,205	72.01		
Woleu, 4th	Union for the Republic	670	21.88		
Woleu, 4th	Gabonese Democratic Party	135	4.41		
Woleu, 4th	Gabonese Social Democrats	52	1.70		
Woleu, 4th	Valid votes	3,062	98.62		
Woleu, 4th	Invalid/blank votes	43	1.38		
Woleu, 4th	Total votes	3,105	100		
Woleu, 4th	Registered voters/turnout	3,869	80.25		
Woleu, 5th	Democratic Union of Builders	1,196	52.23		
Woleu, 5th	Rally for the Fatherland and Modernity	381	16.64		
Woleu, 5th	Gabonese Democratic Party	231	10.09		
Woleu, 5th	Independent	177	7.73		
Woleu, 5th	Patriotic Alliance	131	5.72		
Woleu, 5th	Rally for Gabon–Christian Democratic Bloc–UN–LD	93	4.06		
Woleu, 5th	National Union	81	3.54		
Woleu, 5th	Valid votes	2,290	98.16		
Woleu, 5th	Invalid/blank votes	43	1.84		
Woleu, 5th	Total votes	2,333	100		
Woleu, 5th	Registered voters/turnout	3,497	66.71		
Haut-Ntem, 1st	Democratic Union of Builders	1,614	69.81		
Haut-Ntem, 1st	Independent	394	17.04		
Haut-Ntem, 1st	Patriotic Alliance	202	8.74		
Haut-Ntem, 1st	Gabonese Democratic Party	102	4.41		
Haut-Ntem, 1st	Valid votes	2,312	88.18		
Haut-Ntem, 1st	Invalid/blank votes	310	11.82		
Haut-Ntem, 1st	Total votes	2,622	100		
Haut-Ntem, 1st	Registered voters/turnout	5,741	45.67		
Haut-Ntem, 2nd	Democratic Union of Builders	677	33.51	1,870	96.74
Haut-Ntem, 2nd	Independent	532	26.34	63	3.26
Haut-Ntem, 2nd	Patriotic Alliance	400	19.80		
Haut-Ntem, 2nd	Rally for Gabon	192	9.50		
Haut-Ntem, 2nd	Rally for the Fatherland and Modernity	112	5.54		
Haut-Ntem, 2nd	Gabonese Democratic Party	86	4.26		
Haut-Ntem, 2nd	Independent	21	1.04		
Haut-Ntem, 2nd	Valid votes	2,020	75.15	1,933	97.53
Haut-Ntem, 2nd	Invalid/blank votes	668	24.85	49	2.47
Haut-Ntem, 2nd	Total votes	2,688	100	1,982	100
Haut-Ntem, 2nd	Registered voters/turnout	5,532	48.59	4,136	47.92
Ntem, 1st	Democratic Union of Builders	2,343	52.33		
Ntem, 1st	Rally for the Fatherland and Modernity	626	13.98		
Ntem, 1st	Gabonese Social Democrats	485	10.83		
Ntem, 1st	Independent	284	6.34		
Ntem, 1st	Patriotic Alliance	228	5.09		
Ntem, 1st	Gabonese Democratic Party	224	5.00		
Ntem, 1st	Independent	124	2.77		
Ntem, 1st	Together for Gabon	85	1.90		
Ntem, 1st	Independent	78	1.74		
Ntem, 1st	Valid votes	4,477	97.26		
Ntem, 1st	Invalid/blank votes	126	2.74		
Ntem, 1st	Total votes	4,603	100		
Ntem, 1st	Registered voters/turnout	8,885	51.81		
Ntem, 2nd	Democratic Union of Builders	1,238	49.07	Cancelled	
Ntem, 2nd	National Union	575	22.79	Cancelled	
Ntem, 2nd	Rally for the Fatherland and Modernity	310	12.29	Cancelled	
Ntem, 2nd	Independent	171	6.78	Cancelled	
Ntem, 2nd	Independent	133	5.27	Cancelled	
Ntem, 2nd	Gabonese Democratic Party	96	3.80	Cancelled	
Ntem, 2nd	Valid votes	2,523	93.55	Cancelled	
Ntem, 2nd	Invalid/blank votes	174	6.45	Cancelled	
Ntem, 2nd	Total votes	2,697	100	Cancelled	
Ntem, 2nd	Registered voters/turnout	4,367	61.76	Cancelled	
Ntem, 3rd	Democratic Union of Builders	718	46.87	1,012	72.60
Ntem, 3rd	Independent	225	14.69	382	27.40
Ntem, 3rd	Rally for the Fatherland and Modernity	166	10.84		
Ntem, 3rd	The Democrats	161	10.51		
Ntem, 3rd	Patriotic Alliance	127	8.29		
Ntem, 3rd	Gabonese Democratic Party	101	6.59		
Ntem, 3rd	Circle of Liberal Reformers	26	1.70		
Ntem, 3rd	Independent	8	0.52		
Ntem, 3rd	Valid votes	1,532	93.30	1,394	98.80
Ntem, 3rd	Invalid/blank votes	110	6.70	17	1.20
Ntem, 3rd	Total votes	1,642	100	1,411	100
Ntem, 3rd	Registered voters/turnout	2,807	58.50	2,807	50.27
Ntem, 4th	Democratic Union of Builders	2,770	70.93		
Ntem, 4th	The Democrats	719	18.41		
Ntem, 4th	Gabonese Democratic Party	140	3.59		
Ntem, 4th	Movement for National Rectification	82	2.10		
Ntem, 4th	Together for Gabon	81	2.07		
Ntem, 4th	Independent	61	1.56		
Ntem, 4th	Independent	52	1.33		
Ntem, 4th	Valid votes	3,905	94.51		
Ntem, 4th	Invalid/blank votes	227	5.49		
Ntem, 4th	Total votes	4,132	100		
Ntem, 4th	Registered voters/turnout	5,613	73.61		
Okano, 1st	Democratic Union of Builders	1,047	44.44	1,394	56.71
Okano, 1st	National Union	956	40.58	1,064	43.29
Okano, 1st	Gabonese Democratic Party	187	7.94		
Okano, 1st	Gabonese Social Democrats	97	4.12		
Okano, 1st	Together for Gabon	69	2.93		
Okano, 1st	Valid votes	2,356	98.04	2,458	97.93
Okano, 1st	Invalid/blank votes	47	1.96	52	2.07
Okano, 1st	Total votes	2,403	100	2,510	100
Okano, 1st	Registered voters/turnout	2,675	89.83	5,839	42.99
Okano, 2nd	Democratic Union of Builders	665	43.87	370	84.47
Okano, 2nd	National Union	282	18.60	68	15.53
Okano, 2nd	Patriotic Alliance	272	17.94		
Okano, 2nd	Gabonese Democratic Party	244	16.09		
Okano, 2nd	Union for the Republic	38	2.51		
Okano, 2nd	Gabonese Social Democrats	15	0.99		
Okano, 2nd	Valid votes	1,516	95.95	438	97.33
Okano, 2nd	Invalid/blank votes	64	4.05	12	2.67
Okano, 2nd	Total votes	1,580	100	450	100
Okano, 2nd	Registered voters/turnout	2,675	59.07	2,833	15.88
Okano, 3rd	Democratic Union of Builders	883	42.64	465	78.41
Okano, 3rd	Independent	573	27.67	128	21.59
Okano, 3rd	Gabonese Social Democrats	195	9.42		
Okano, 3rd	National Union	123	5.94		
Okano, 3rd	Gabonese Democratic Party	81	3.91		
Okano, 3rd	Independent	79	3.81		
Okano, 3rd	The Democrats	60	2.90		
Okano, 3rd	Patriotic Alliance	49	2.37		
Okano, 3rd	Rally for Gabon	28	1.35		
Okano, 3rd	Valid votes	2,071	97.60	593	98.50
Okano, 3rd	Invalid/blank votes	51	2.40	9	1.50
Okano, 3rd	Total votes	2,122	100	602	100
Okano, 3rd	Registered voters/turnout	2,735	77.59	3,763	16.00
Haut-Como, 1st	Democratic Union of Builders	1,111	71.13		
Haut-Como, 1st	Patriotic Alliance	311	19.91		
Haut-Como, 1st	National Union	140	8.96		
Haut-Como, 1st	Valid votes	1,562	95.54		
Haut-Como, 1st	Invalid/blank votes	73	4.46		
Haut-Como, 1st	Total votes	1,635	100		
Haut-Como, 1st	Registered voters/turnout	3,186	51.32		
Haut-Como, 2nd	Democratic Union of Builders	245	29.77	282	49.65
Haut-Como, 2nd	Christian Democratic Bloc	200	24.30	286	50.35
Haut-Como, 2nd	National Union	131	15.92		
Haut-Como, 2nd	Concerted National Coordination for Development	128	15.55		
Haut-Como, 2nd	Gabonese Democratic Party	64	7.78		
Haut-Como, 2nd	Rally for the Fatherland and Modernity	55	6.68		
Haut-Como, 2nd	Valid votes	823	96.03	568	98.78
Haut-Como, 2nd	Invalid/blank votes	34	3.97	7	1.22
Haut-Como, 2nd	Total votes	857	100	575	100
Haut-Como, 2nd	Registered voters/turnout	1,725	49.68	1,725	33.33
Africa	Democratic Union of Builders	1,916	58.79		
Africa	National Union	622	19.09		
Africa	Independent	205	6.29		
Africa	Independent	178	5.46		
Africa	Gabonese Democratic Party	165	5.06		
Africa	Independent	83	2.55		
Africa	Independent	81	2.49		
Africa	Votes difference	9	0.28		
Africa	Valid votes	3,259	95.91		
Africa	Invalid/blank votes	139	4.09		
Africa	Total votes	3,398	100		
Africa	Registered voters/turnout	13,323	25.50		
Americas-Asia-Europe	Democratic Union of Builders	1,068	39.61	1,150	85.88
Americas-Asia-Europe	Circle of Liberal Reformers	158	5.86	189	14.12
Americas-Asia-Europe	Independent	145	5.38		
Americas-Asia-Europe	Independent	131	4.86		
Americas-Asia-Europe	Together for Gabon	129	4.78		
Americas-Asia-Europe	Democratic Socialist Front	104	3.86		
Americas-Asia-Europe	Gabonese Democratic Party	91	3.38		
Americas-Asia-Europe	Independent	74	2.74		
Americas-Asia-Europe	Independent	74	2.74		
Americas-Asia-Europe	Independent	73	2.71		
Americas-Asia-Europe	Independent	67	2.49		
Americas-Asia-Europe	Independent	61	2.26		
Americas-Asia-Europe	Independent	56	2.08		
Americas-Asia-Europe	Independent	55	2.04		
Americas-Asia-Europe	Independent	48	1.78		
Americas-Asia-Europe	Rally for the Fatherland and Modernity	43	1.59		
Americas-Asia-Europe	National Union	40	1.48		
Americas-Asia-Europe	Independent	38	1.41		
Americas-Asia-Europe	Independent	32	1.19		
Americas-Asia-Europe	Independent	31	1.15		
Americas-Asia-Europe	Independent	28	1.04		
Americas-Asia-Europe	Independent	28	1.04		
Americas-Asia-Europe	Independent	25	0.93		
Americas-Asia-Europe	Independent	17	0.63		
Americas-Asia-Europe	Independent	7	0.26		
Americas-Asia-Europe	Independent	5	0.19		
Americas-Asia-Europe	Rally for the Fatherland and Modernity	3	0.11		
Americas-Asia-Europe	Votes difference	65	2.41		
Americas-Asia-Europe	Valid votes	2,696	92.68	1,339	90.41
Americas-Asia-Europe	Invalid/blank votes	213	7.32	142	9.59
Americas-Asia-Europe	Total votes	2,909	100	1,481	100
Americas-Asia-Europe	Registered voters/turnout	13,949	20.85	14,138	10.48
