= BDC =

BDC may mean:

== Business and finance ==
- Becton, Dickinson and Company, a medical products manufacturer
- Business Data Catalog
- Business Development Bank of Canada
- Business Development Company - is a publicly traded private equity tax-advantaged investment company in the US investing in small and mid-sized businesses
- BDC Aero Industrie, a Canadian aircraft manufacturer based in Lachute, Quebec

== Other ==
- Backup Domain Controller
- BDC, the Indian Railways code for Bandel Junction railway station, Hooghly, West Bengal, India
- Beat Down Clan - a heel wrestling stable in Total Nonstop Action Wrestling
- Beck Depression Checklist or Burns Depression Checklist, both of which are associated with the Beck Depression Inventory
- Berlin Document Center
- Binary Delta Compression
- Bishop Druitt College, a K-12 school situated in Coffs Harbour, New South Wales, Australia
- Black Diamond Conference, an Illinois high school athletic conference
- Boolean Differential Calculus, a subject field of Boolean algebra discussing changes of Boolean variables and functions
- Bottom dead centre, the position of a piston when it is nearest a crankshaft
- Brian Deer Classification System
- British Dance Council
- Broadway Dance Center
- Bullet drop compensation
- Bellini duct carcinoma, a rare type of cancer that affects the Bellini duct of the kidney.
- Terephthalic acid, benzene-1,4-dicarboxylic acid, abbreviated BDC
- BDC (group)
- Christian Democratic Bloc
