= Gabonese Social Democrats =

Gabonese Social Democrats Sociaux-Démocrates Gabonais
- Abbreviation: SDG
- President: Juste Louangou Bouyomeka
- Ideology: Social democracy Third Way
- Colors: Purple
- National Assembly: 2 / 145

The Gabonese Social Democrats (French: Sociaux-Démocrates Gabonais, SDG) is a political party in Gabon.

== History ==
The party won two seats in the National Assembly of Gabon at the 2025 Gabonese parliamentary election.

== Ideology ==
The Gabonese Social Democrats are a social democratic party.

== See also ==
- List of political parties in Gabon
