= Christian Maronga =

Gabonese politician

Christian Maronga

Christian Serge Maronga (12 October 1959 – 5 August 2008) was a Gabonese politician and President of the Rally of Democrats (RDD) party.

Maronga was a municipal official in Libreville. Running as the RDD candidate in presidential election held on 27 November 2005, he finished last out of five candidates, winning 0.30% of the vote.

As a representative of the opposition, Maronga was included on the joint majority–opposition commission on the reform of the electoral process, which began its work in May 2006 and included 12 representatives from the Presidential Majority as well as 12 from the opposition.

Suffering from diabetes, he was hospitalized for a month at the Hospital Center of Libreville before dying on 5 August 2008.
