= Rally for the Fatherland and Modernity =

Rally for the Fatherland and Modernity Rassemblement pour la patrie et la modernité
- Abbreviation: RPM
- President: Alexandre Barro Chambrier
- Ideology: Anti-corruption
- Colors: Blue
- National Assembly: 3 / 145

The Rally for the Fatherland and Modernity (French: Rassemblement pour la patrie et la modernité, RPM) is a political party in Gabon.

== History ==
The party supported Brice Oligui Nguema in the 2025 Gabonese presidential election. The party won three seats in the National Assembly of Gabon at the 2025 Gabonese parliamentary election.

== Ideology ==
RPM aims to "bring about a profound transformation of the political class, placing the expectations of the Gabonese people at the heart of its platform and championing a vision of justice and progress".

== Members ==
- Alexandre Barro Chambrier
- Séraphin Moundounga
