= Union for the Republic (Gabon) =

Union for the Republic Union pour la République
- Abbreviation: UPR
- President: Gervais Oniane
- Colors: Blue
- National Assembly: 1 / 145

The Union for the Republic (French: Union pour la République, UPR) is a political party in Gabon.

== History ==
The party won one seat in the National Assembly of Gabon at the 2025 Gabonese parliamentary election.
