= Democratic Socialist Front =

Political party in Gabon

Democratic Socialist Front Front Démocratique Socialiste
- Abbreviation: FDS
- President: Anges-Kévin Nzigou
- Founded: 22 March 2025
- Ideology: Democratic socialism
- Political position: Left-wing
- Colors: Blue
- National Assembly: 1 / 145

The Democratic Socialist Front (French: Front Démocratique Socialiste, FDS) is a political party in Gabon.

== History ==
Anges-Kévin Nzigou is president of the Democratic Socialist Front. The party won one seat in the National Assembly of Gabon at the 2025 Gabonese parliamentary election.
