= Democratic Union of Builders =

Democratic Union of Builders Union Démocratique des Bâtisseurs
- Abbreviation: UDB
- Leader: Brice Oligui Nguema
- Founder: Brice Oligui Nguema
- Founded: 12 March 2025 (as political platform) 25 June 2025 (as political party)
- Membership (2025): 22,000
- Ideology: Developmentalism; Economic nationalism Social conservatism
- Political position: Syncretic
- Colours: Green; Yellow; Blue
- Slogan: "Inclusivity, Development, Happiness" (French: "Inclusivité, Développement, Félicité")
- National Assembly: 101 / 145 (70%)
- Senate: 46 / 70 (66%)

Website
- udb.ga

The Democratic Union of Builders (French: Union démocratique des bâtisseurs; UDB) formerly known as the Rally of Builders (French: Rassemblement des bâtisseurs; RdB) is a Gabonese political party founded by President Brice Oligui Nguema on 12 March 2025 to support his candidacy in the 2025 presidential election. Even though it was originally a political platform to support Oligui during the elections with the platform dissolving after the election, Oligui announced that the RdB would transform into a political party, which was effective on 23 June 2025..

== History ==
=== Foundation ===
On 12 March 2025, in Libreville, transitional President and presidential candidate Brice Oligui Nguema announced the launch of his political platform named Rally of Builders. A week earlier, when he announced his candidacy, Oligui said he would create a platform that brings together all those who share his vision for Gabon. Many Gabonese associations supporting Oligui's candidacy participated in the launch of the movement. Attorney and For the Change (PLC) party leader Anges Kevin Nzigou was appointed as the platform's coordinator general.

By the end of Oligui's presidential campaign, 4,200 associations, 84 political parties and 22,000 individual members had joined the platform. Many members of the former ruling Gabonese Democratic Party also joined the platform, taking up positions in its provincial coordination bodies.

=== Transformation into party ===
On 29 March 2025, the day of the official launch of the presidential campaign, RdB coordinator Marc Ona declared that "For the Gabonese, it’s the party of Brice Clotaire Oligui Nguema, even though for the presidential election, it’s simply a movement to support his candidacy".

Despite Oligui previously stating that his platform would be disbanded after the presidential election, on 14 April 2025, after Brice Oligui won the vote by a landslide, Rally of Builders coordinator general Anges Kevin Nzigou announced the upcoming transformation of RdB into a political party, expected on 19 April 2025. Nzigou said Rally of Builders plans to transform itself into "a truly structured, democratic political party, faithful to the Rally's ideals and now ready to become the political matrix of the president-elect's future majority."

== Ideology ==
The Democratic Union of Builders (UDB) espouses a syncretic ideology that observers have described as "patriotic developmentalism" and sovereignism. The party does not subscribe to a traditional left–right political spectrum, but rather positions itself as a pragmatic movement rooted in the "Spirit of August 30," referring to the 2023 Gabonese coup d'état that ousted the Bongo family. The UDB's doctrine is codified in its slogan—"Inclusivity, Development, Happiness" (Félicité)—and prioritizes the physical reconstruction of the state apparatus over abstract political dogma.

=== The "Builder" state and developmentalism ===
Central to the party's identity is the concept of the "Builder" (Bâtisseur), which frames governance as an engineering challenge requiring hierarchical efficiency rather than political negotiation. The UDB advocates for a dirigiste economic model where the state serves as the primary engine of infrastructure development. This approach was formalized in the party's "Republic at Work" (La République au travail) platform, which asserts that political legitimacy is derived from concrete projects such as the Belinga iron ore railway and hydroelectric dams rather than electoral rhetoric.

President Brice Clotaire Oligui Nguema has frequently contrasted this "pragmatism of concrete" with what he terms the "intellectualized" politics of the previous era. He presents himself not merely as a head of state but as a "foreman-in-chief" tasked with physically repairing the nation's foundations. This ideology was reflected in the UDB's inaugural 2026 budget, which allocated a historic 3,204 billion FCFA to public investment, specifically targeting energy independence and housing construction to address the country's "infrastructure deficit."

=== Economic sovereignism ===
The UDB promotes a doctrine of assertive resource nationalism, positing that political independence is functionally nonexistent without economic sovereignty. In his address to the nation marking the end of the transition, Nguema argued that the "patriotic spirit" of the new republic required the reclamation of the national economy from foreign dominance. Consequently, the party has implemented policies aimed at ending the "rentier" economy that characterized the Bongo era.

The party's economic program mandates the domestic processing of raw materials, specifically timber, manganese, and oil, to retain value within Gabon and foster industrialization. Furthermore, the UDB has enforced strict fiscal sovereignty measures, including a requirement that dividends from state participations in private enterprises be paid exclusively to the Public Treasury. This policy was designed to dismantle the opaque "slush funds" and intermediaries that historically facilitated capital flight and corruption within the state-owned sector.

=== Social restoration and inclusivity ===
A distinct element of the UDB's ideology is the political elevation of Félicité ("Happiness" or "Bliss"), a term derived from the Gabonese national anthem, La Concorde. The party frames its mission as the restoration of the social contract, combining populist appeals for dignity with a socially conservative emphasis on discipline, order, and civic morality. The UDB portrays the "Liberation" not only as a political change but as a spiritual restoration of Gabonese pride following decades of "shame" and "spoliation."

Structurally, the UDB operates as a "big tent" organization intended to transcend partisan divides through a strategy of "inclusivity." Rather than banning the former ruling Gabonese Democratic Party (PDG), the UDB absorbed significant portions of its membership and leadership structure. Nguema justified this absorption by declaring that "geopolitics"—a local euphemism for ethnic or partisan clientelism—must be replaced by "competence." This approach has allowed the party to present itself as a vehicle for national reconciliation while effectively neutralizing opposition by integrating potential rivals into the state apparatus.

== Electoral history ==
=== Presidential elections ===
| Election | Candidate | Votes | % | Result |
|---|---|---|---|---|
| 2025 | Brice Oligui Nguema (Endorsed) | 588,074 | 94.85% | Elected ✓ |

=== National Assembly elections ===
| Election | Votes | % | Seats | +/– | Position | Result |
|---|---|---|---|---|---|---|
| 2025 | in alliance with PDG | | 101 / 145 | New | 1st | Supermajority government |
