= 2025 Gabonese presidential election =

- 12 April 2025
- Turnout: 70.69%
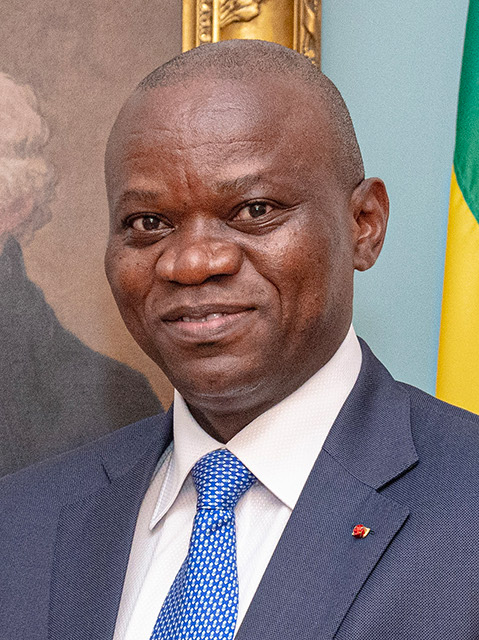

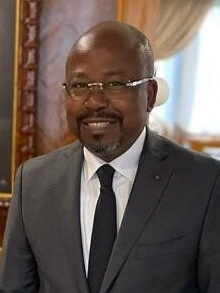
Nominee	Brice Oligui Nguema	Alain Claude; Bilie By Nze
Party	Independent (Note: Independent candidate endorsed by the Rally of Builders.)	EPG
Votes	588,074	19,265
Percentage	94.85%	3.11%
President before election
Brice Oligui
Nguema (transitional)
Military
Elected President
Brice Oligui
Nguema
RdB

A presidential election was held in Gabon on 12 April 2025. They were the first election in the country since the Bongo dynasty was overthrown in the 2023 coup after 56 years in power. Incumbent transitional president Brice Oligui Nguema ran as an independent, under his Rally of Builders platform.

Voter turnout was 70%, the highest since 1993, the first multi-party elections. The following day, Oligui was proclaimed the winner of the elections, receiving 90% of the votes, while his main opponent Alain Claude Bilie By Nze received 3%.

== Background ==
In August 2023, a general election was held, where incumbent president Ali Bongo won a third term with 64% of the votes. The results were heavily controversial and disputed and four days later, the Gabonese Army and the Gabonese Republican Guard, led by Brigadier General Brice Oligui Nguema, who was a cousin of Bongo, led a coup d'état which ousted and arrested Bongo and his government, annulled the election results, and dissolved all state institutions. The military assumed control of the country and established a junta with Nguema as transitional president.

On 13 November, the junta promised free and fair elections to be held. Nguema and the junta promised to return power to civilians at the end of a two year military transition. However in early March 2025 he resigned from the military and presented himself as a civilian and therefore eligible to run as a candidate.

On 9 January 2025, Oligui announced that the country would hold a presidential election on 22 March 2025. This decision followed the adoption of a new constitution in November 2024, which establishes a presidential system with term limits and stricter eligibility requirements. However, on 22 January, the government announced that the election would be held on 12 April 2025. The date was six months earlier than the transition arrangement allowed for.

On 20 January, the Transitional Parliament approved a new electoral code, allowing members of the security forces and magistrates to run for office and reserving two seats in parliament for members of the Gabonese diaspora. An age limit of 70 was set for president, barring the most well-known opposition candidates. It also allowed dual nationals to become candidates except in presidential elections, without having to renounce their other nationality and moved the responsibility of organizing elections from local governments to the interior ministry.

Applications were submitted between 27 February and 8 March 2025.

=== Constitutional referendum ===
On 16 November 2024, Gabon held a constitutional referendum, which was approved by 91% of the electorate. As a result, the post of Prime Minister was abolished, presidential terms were set at seven years, renewable once, and the president was required to have at least one Gabonese parent and a Gabonese spouse. The referendum was also seen by many as a key step towards the return to civilian rule after the 2023 coup.

== Electoral system ==
The President of Gabon is elected for a seven-year term via the two-round system.

== Candidates ==
=== Declared and accepted ===
- Brice Oligui Nguema, transitional president (Rally of Builders)
- Alain Claude Bilie By Nze, former prime minister (Ensemble pour le Gabon)
- Stéphane Germain Iloko, former Gabonese Democratic Party executive (Large Rassemblement Arc-en-ciel)
- Joseph Lapensée Essigone, lawyer and tax inspector (Independent)
- Gninga Chaning Zenaba, entrepreneur (Independent)
- Axel Stophène Ibinga Ibinga, entrepreneur (Independent)
- Thierry Yvon Michel Ngoma, entrepreneur (Independent)
- Alain Simplice Gombré, civil engineer, transport economist and civil servant (Gabonese Patriotic Party)

=== Declared and not accepted ===
- Jean-Rémi Yama (Parti national pour le travail et le progrès)

=== Not allowed due to age limit ===
- Albert Ondo Ossa
- Pierre Claver Maganga Moussavou (Social Democratic Party)

== Conduct ==
The Gabonese foreign ministry said that the African Union and the European Union would send observers to monitor the election. Around 3,000 polling stations were utilised to serve around 920,000 voters, including 28,000 based overseas. The Gabonese Civil Society Organizations Observation Mission said at least 94.8% of the polling stations that it observed operated under satisfactory conditions, while 98.6% of polling stations operated in a satisfactorily transparent manner.

According to initial reports, international observers "did not notice any major incidents". The Commonwealth Observer Group praised the presidential election as calm and orderly, and commended the improved media landscape with media stakeholders experiencing reduced state interference in editorial content, but called for citizens to become more involved in the electoral process. However some opposition heavyweights who could have posed a serious political challenge were excluded from the race according to the BBC.

== Results ==
Provisional results released on 13 April showed that Oligui had won 90.35% of the vote while Bilie by Nze won 3.02%, with the remainder going to six other candidates. Turnout was estimated at 70.4%.

On 18 April, Interior and Security Minister Herman Immongo held a press briefing to correct "errors" in the previously announced election results. After a full centralization of the protocols, the results showed Oligui receiving 94.85% of the votes. The corrected results were submitted to the Constitutional Court, which certified them on 25 April.

Candidate	Party	Votes	%
Brice Oligui Nguema	Independent (Rally of Builders)	588,074	94.85
Alain Claude Bilie By Nze	Ensemble pour le Gabon	19,265	3.11
Joseph Lapensée Essigone	Independent	3,744	0.60
Gninga Chaning Zenaba	Independent	2,419	0.39
Alain Simplice Gombré	Gabonese Patriotic Party	2,299	0.37
Stéphane Germain Iloko	Large Rassemblement Arc-en-ciel	2,214	0.36
Axel Stophène Ibinga Ibinga	Independent	1,384	0.22
Thierry Yvon Michel N'Goma	Independent	601	0.10
Total		620,000	100.00
Valid votes		620,000	96.48
Invalid/blank votes		22,632	3.52
Total votes		642,632	100.00
Registered voters/turnout		916,625	70.11
Source: CC

== Aftermath ==
Bilie By Nze described the election as "unfree" and marred by the "hijacking of all State resources". Bilie By Nze added he nevertheless wishes the new leadership good luck and promised to remain in politics.

Oligui was officially inaugurated as president on 3 May. Gninga Chaning Zenaba was appointed as Minister of Entrepreneurship, Trade and SMEs by presidential decree two days later on 5 May. At the inauguration were present 17 African heads of state, including Bassirou Diomaye Faye from Senegal, Julius Maada Bio, from Sierra Leone, John Mahama from Ghana, Adama Barrow from The Gambia, Paul Kagame from Rwanda, William Ruto from Kenya, Paul Biya from Cameroon, Teodoro Obiang Nguema Mbasogo from Equatorial Guinea, Évariste Ndayishimiye from Burundi, Ismaïl Omar Guelleh from Djibouti, Mamady Doumbouya from Guinea, João Lourenço from Angola, Azali Assoumani from Comoros and Félix Tshisekedi from the Democratic Republic of Congo. Also present were Nigerian Vice President Kashim Shettima; US President's Special Adviser on Africa Massad Boulos; and Chinese President Xi Jinping's Special Envoy Mu Hong.
