= Rally for the New Republic =

Rally for the New Republic Rassemblement pour la Nouvelle République
- Abbreviation: RNR
- President: Jean Ping
- Ideology: Reformism
- Colors: Yellow
- National Assembly: 1 / 145

The Rally for the New Republic (French: Rassemblement pour la Nouvelle République, RNR), originally the Union for Progress and Freedom (French: Union pour le Progrès et la Liberté) is a political party in Gabon.

== History ==
The party won one seat in the National Assembly of Gabon at the 2025 Gabonese parliamentary election.
