= Rally of Democrats =

Political party in Gabon

The Rally of Democrats (French: Rassemblement des Démocrates, RDD) is a minor political party in Gabon.

== History ==
The RDD was established in 1993 by Christian Serge Maronga. Maronga was the party's candidate in 2005 presidential elections, fishing last in a field of five candidates with 0.3% of the vote.
