= Christian Democratic Bloc =

Christian Democratic Bloc Bloc Démocratique Chrétien
- Abbreviation: BDC
- President: Anna-Claudine Mavioga
- Ideology: Christian democracy
- Colors: Green
- National Assembly: 1 / 145

The Christian Democratic Bloc (French: Bloc Démocratique Chrétien, BDC) is a political party in Gabon.

== History ==
The Christian Democratic Bloc supported Brice Oligui Nguema in the 2025 Gabonese presidential election. The party won one seat in the National Assembly of Gabon at the 2025 Gabonese parliamentary election.
