= The Democrats (Gabon) =

Political party in Gabon

The Democrats Les Démocrates
- Abbreviation: LD
- Leader: Guy Nzouba Ndama
- Founded: 2017
- Headquarters: Libreville
- Ideology: Social conservatism
- National affiliation: Coalition for the New Republic
- Slogan: Unité, Justice, Progrès
- National Assembly: 10 / 143
- Senate: 0 / 102

The Democrats (French: Les Démocrates, abbreviated LD) is a political party in Gabon.

The party was established in Libreville in March 2017 by members of the collapsed Alliance for the New Gabon (ANG). It is chaired by the former Speaker of the National Assembly Guy Nzouba Ndama. The party won 11 seats in the 2018 parliamentary elections, which made it the biggest opposition party. The party is a member of Gabon's Coalition for the New Republic (CNR).
