= Circle of Liberal Reformers =

Political party in Gabon

Circle of Liberal Reformers Cercle des libéraux réformateurs
- Founded: 1993
- Split from: Gabonese Democratic Party
- Ideology: Liberalism; Environmentalism
- National Assembly: 1 / 121
- Senate: 7 / 100

The Circle of Liberal Reformers (French: Cercle des libéraux réformateurs, CLR) is a political party in Gabon.

== History ==
The CLR was formed in 1993 as a breakaway from the ruling Gabonese Democratic Party (PDG), and was led by Jean-Boniface Assélé. It supported incumbent President Omar Bongo of the PDG in the 1993 presidential elections.

The party won two seats in the 1996 parliamentary elections, and retained both in the 2001 elections. It was part of the PDG-led bloc in the 2006 elections, again retaining both seats. It was reduced to one seat in the 2011 elections.
