= Union for the New Republic (Gabon) =

Political party in Gabon

The Union for the New Republic (French: Union pour la nouvelle république, UPNR) is a political party in Gabon founded by Louis-Gaston Mayila.

== History ==
The party was established by Mayila in July 2007. It supported Pierre Mamboundou of the Union of the Gabonese People in the 2009 presidential elections. In the 2011 parliamentary elections it received 1.2% of the vote, winning one seat.
