= Social Democratic Party (Gabon) =

Political party in Gabon

Social Democratic Party Parti social-démocrate
- Leader: Pierre Claver Maganga Moussavou
- Founded: 1991
- Ideology: Social democracy
- Political position: Centre-left
- National Assembly: 1 / 121
- Senate: 2 / 100

The Social Democratic Party (French: Parti social-démocrate, PSD) is a political party in Gabon. It is part of the Presidential Majority coalition and is led by Pierre Claver Maganga Moussavou.

== History ==
The PSD was established in 1991. Maganga Moussavou was nominated as its candidate for the 1993 presidential election, finishing fourth in a field of thirteen candidates with 3.6% of the vote. He ran again in the 1998 presidential election, this time finishing fifth out of the eight candidates with 1% of the vote.

The party won a single seat in the National Assembly in the 2001 parliamentary election, and subsequently joined the Gabonese Democratic Party (PDG)-led government. It did not put forward a candidate for the 2005 presidential election, but won two seat in the 2006 parliamentary election, in which it was part of the pro-PDG bloc.

Maganga Moussavou was nominated as the PSD candidate for the 2009 presidential election, finishing sixth in a field of eighteen candidates with 0.8% of the vote. The party was reduced to one seat in the 2011 parliamentary election.
