= National Assembly of Gabon =

Lower house of the Parliament of Gabon

National Assembly Assemblée Nationale
- 14th Legislature

Type
- Type: Lower house Unicameral (1960–1997)

History
- Founded: 1960
- New session started: 17 November 2025

Leadership
- President: Régis Onanga Ndiaye, UDB since 17 November 2025
- First Vice President: Éloi Nzondo, UDB since 17 November 2025
- Second Vice President: Jeannot Kalima, PDG since 17 November 2025

Structure
- Seats: 145
- Political groups: Government (101): UDB (101); Opposition (41): PDG (21) (Note: PDG (17); UDB (4)); UN (2); PSD (1); Others (9); Independents (8); Vacant (3): Vacant (3)

Elections
- Voting system: Two-round system
- First election: 12 February 1961
- Last election: 27 September 2025
- Next election: 2030

Meeting place
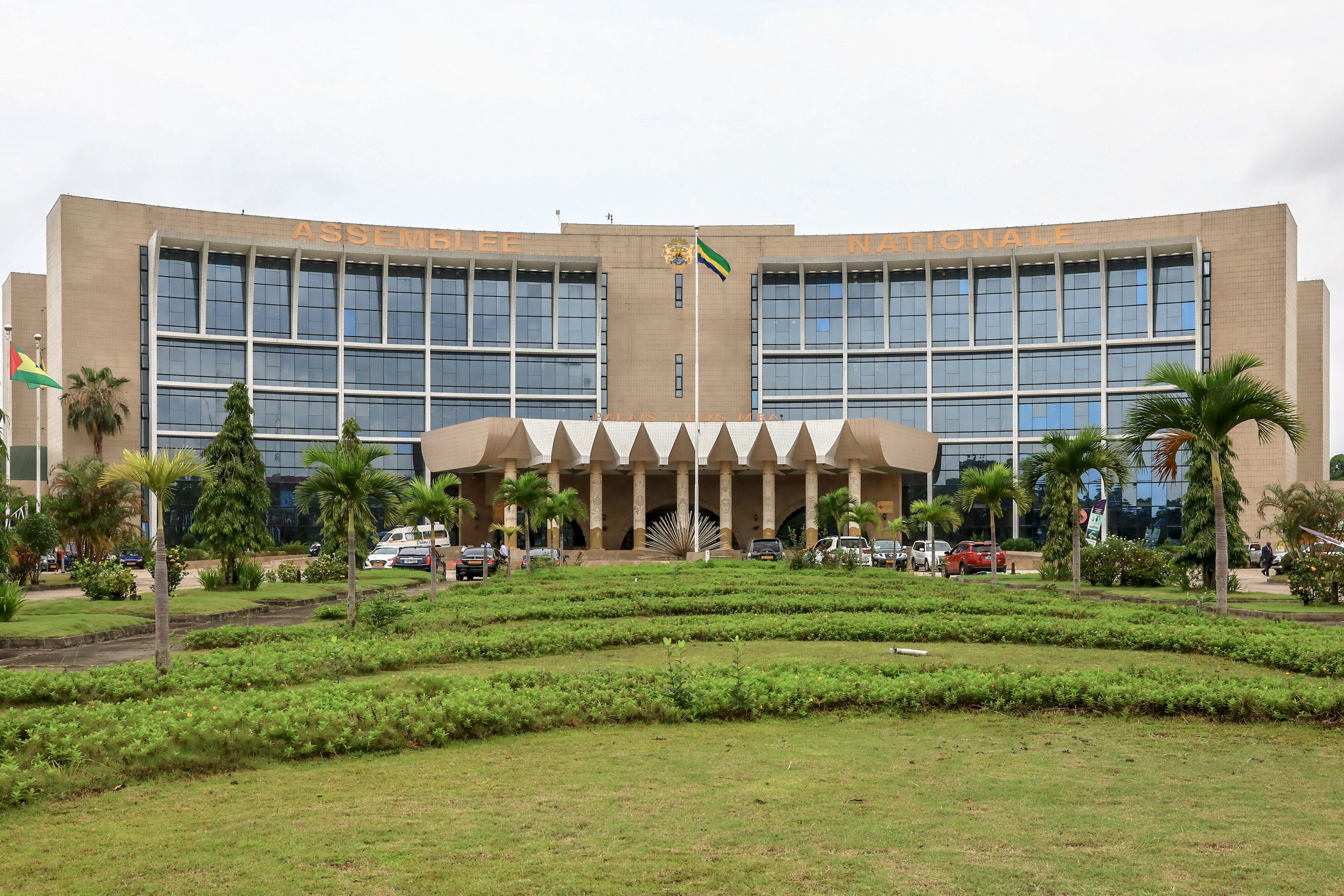
- Leon Mba Palace; Libreville, Estuaire Province

Website
- www.assemblee-nationale.ga

The National Assembly (French: Assemblée Nationale) is the lower house of the Parliament of Gabon. It has 145 members, elected by two-round system

== Legislative history ==
National Assembly was established in 1960 by the Constitution of Gabon as a unicameral legislature. The members were elected by direct universal suffrage for a seven-year term. During the single-party rule from 1967 to 1990, all members were from Gabonese Democratic Party (PDG), the sole legal party. In 1979 the mandate of the members was reduced from seven years to five years. Single-party system was dropped in 1990. Bicameral system was introduced, and Senate of Gabon was established in 1997. The status of the Parliament was unclear following the coup d'état four days after the 2023 general election.

== Latest results ==
Party	First round			Second round			Total seats	+/–
Party	Votes	%	Seats	Votes	%	Seats	Total seats	+/–
Democratic Union of Builders			55			46	101	New
Gabonese Democratic Party			4			11	15	–83
National Union			0			4	4	+2
Rally for the Fatherland and Modernity			1			1	2	New
Gabonese Social Democrats			0			2	2	New
Christian Democratic Bloc			0			1	1	New
Democratic Socialist Front			0			1	1	New
Rally for the New Republic			0			1	1	New
Union for the New Republic			0			1	1	0
Independents			2			7	9	+1
Vacant			6			2	8	–
Total			68			77	145	+2
Source: Info247

== Members (since 1990) ==
- List of members of the National Assembly of Gabon, 1990–1996
- List of members of the National Assembly of Gabon, 2001–2006
- List of members of the National Assembly of Gabon, 2006–2011
- List of members of the National Assembly of Gabon (current)

== See also ==
- List of presidents of the National Assembly of Gabon
