= 2020 in Middle Africa =

The following lists events that happened during 2020 in Middle Africa, also called Central Africa. The countries listed are those described are: Angola, Cameroon, Central African Republic, Chad, Democratic Republic of the Congo, Equatorial Guinea, Gabon, the Republic of the Congo, and São Tomé and Príncipe.

The combined population of the nine countries is 177,533,990 (February 10, 2020)

== Countries ==
=== Angola ===
The struggle for independence from Portugal that began in 1961 culminated in the establishment of the independent People's Republic of Angola on November 11, 1975. This was followed by the 26-year Angolan Civil War, becoming the Republic of Angola in 2002. Angola is a member of the African Union (AU), the Community of Portuguese Language Countries (CPL), the Organization of the Petroleum Exporting Countries (OPEC), the Southern African Development Community (SADC), and the United Nations (UN). The capital is Luanda. (Note: Angola also includes the enclave of Cabinda.)

- President of Angola: João Lourenço (since September 26, 2017)
  - Vice President: Bornito de Sousa (since September 26, 2017)

=== Cameroon ===
French Cameroon became independent on January 1, 1960, and British Cameroon federated with it in 1961 to form the Federal Republic of Cameroon. This became the United Republic of Cameroon in 1972 and the Republic of Cameroon in 1984. Cameroon is a member of the AU, Non-Aligned Movement (NAM), Organisation of Islamic Cooperation (OIC), and UN. Douala is the economic capital and largest city; Yaoundé is the political capital.

- President of Cameroon: Paul Biya (since November 6, 1982)
- Prime Minister of Cameroon: Joseph Ngute (since January 4, 2019)
  - Deputy Prime Minister Amadou Ali (since 2014)

=== Central African Republic ===
The Central African Republic (CAR) became independent from France in 1960 and was the Central African Empire from 1976 to 1979. The republic was restored in 1979, but it has undergone two civil wars: the Central African Republic Bush War and the Central African Republic Civil War (2012–present). CAR is a member of the AU, Economic Community of Central African States (ECCAS), NAM, International Organisation of La Francophonie (OIF), and UN. Its capital is Bangui.

- President: Faustin-Archange Touadéra (since March 30, 2016)
- Prime Minister: Firmin Ngrébada (since February 25, 2019)

=== Chad ===
The Republic of Chad became independent of France on 11 August 11, 1960. It fought the Chadian Civil War (1965–1979), the Chadian–Libyan conflict (1978-1987), and currently is part of the Multinational Joint Task Force (MNJTF) against the Boko Haram insurgency. The capital is N'Djamena.

- President: Lt. Gen. Idriss Déby (since December 2, 1990)

=== Democratic Republic of the Congo (DRC) ===
The Belgian Congo gained its independence in 1960 and became the Democratic Republic of the Congo (DR Congo) or (DRC) in 1964. It was known as the Republic of Zaire from 1919 to 1997. It went through the First Congo War (1996-1997) and the Second Congo War (1998-2003) and has faced insurrection in eastern Kivu since 2015. DRC is a member of the AU, Common Market for Eastern and Southern Africa (COMESA), NAM, and UN. The capital is Kinshasa.

- President of the Democratic Republic of the Congo: Félix Tshisekedi (since January 25, 2019)
- Prime Minister: Sylvestre Ilunga (since September 7, 2019)
  - Deputy Prime Ministers: Jose Makila, Leonard She Okitundu, Henri Mova Sankanyi (since February 2018)

=== Equatorial Guinea ===
The former Spanish Guinea gained its independence in 1968 as the Republic of Equatorial Guinea. The mainland area is called Río Muni and the Insular Region consists of five islands in three political jurisdictions. The capital is Malabo, located on Bioko Island. The administrative capital of Río Muni is Bata.

- President: Brig. Gen. Teodoro Obiang Nguema Mbasogo (since August 3, 1979)
  - Vice President of Equatorial Guinea: Teodoro Nguema Obiang Mangue (since June 22, 2012)
- Prime Minister: Francisco Pascual Obama Asue (since June 23, 2016)
  - First Deputy Prime Minister Clemente Engonga Nguema Onguene (since 23 June 2016)
  - Second Deputy Prime Minister Angel Mesie Mibuy (since 5 February 2018)
  - Third Deputy Prime Minister Alfonso Nsue Mokuy (since 23 June 2016)

=== Gabon ===
The Gabonese Republic gained its independence from France on August 17, 1960. Gabon is a member of the AU, Economic and Monetary Community of Central Africa (ECCAS and CEMAC), International Monetary Fund (IMF), NAM, OIC, OPEC, UN, and World Bank. The capital is Libreville.

- President: Ali Bongo Ondimba (since October 16, 2009)
  - Vice President: vacant
- Prime Minister
  - Julien Nkoghe Bekale (January 12, 2019—July 16, 2020)
  - Rose Christiane Raponda (since July 16)

=== Republic of the Congo / Congo (Brazzaville) ===
The Republic of the Congo or "Congo (Brazzaville)" gained independence from France on August 15, 1960. It was called People's Republic of the Congo from 1969 to 1992 when it returned to its earlier name but resulted in the Republic of the Congo Civil War (1993–1994). The Republic of the Congo Civil War (1997–1999) brought stability back to the country. The Republic of the Congo is a member of the AU, African Development Bank (AfDB), ECCAS and CEMAC, General Agreement on Tariffs and Trade (GATT), International Coffee Organization (ICO), NAM, and Group of 77 (G77). The capital and largest city is Brazzaville.

- President: Denis Sassou Nguesso (since October 25, 1997)
- Prime Minister: Clément Mouamba (since April 23, 2016)

=== São Tomé and Príncipe ===
São Tomé and Príncipe consists of two main islands—São Tomé Island, where the capital city São Tomé is located and Príncipe—plus several rocky islets. The country gained its independence from Portugal in 1975. It is a founding member of the CPLP.

- President: Evaristo Carvalho (since September 3, 2016)
- Prime Minister: Jorge Bom Jesus (since December 3, 2018)

== Monthly events ==
=== January ===
- January 19 – A suspected female Boko Haram suicide bomber detonated her explosives in Kaiga-Kindjiria, western Chad, killing nine civilians.
- January 24 – The Ministry of Health of the Central African Republic declares a national measles epidemic. 3,600 cases have been infected and 53 people have died between February 2019 and January 2020.
- January 30 – Five new Ebola cases are reported in the Central African Republic.

=== February ===
- February 7 – Twenty-eight people are sentenced to 10 to 15 years of hard labor and five Central African Republic Christian militiamen are sentenced to life terms for war crimes and crimes against humanity.
- February 9 – 2020 Cameroonian parliamentary election
- February 11 – Equatorial Guinea Vice-president Teodorin Obiang, 50, is fined 30 million euros ($32.9m) by a French court for embezzling public funds. His assets are seized but he is given a suspended sentence.
- February 12 – The World Health Organization extends the emergency health status for eastern Democratic Republic of the Congo related to the Ebola outbreak, although they say the situation is "getting better."
- February 16 – U.N. peacekeepers and government forces kill twelve members of the Popular Front for the Rebirth of Central Africa in Birao, Vakaga, Central African Republic.
- February (date unknown) – Festival Amani dance festival in Goma, Democratic Republic of Congo

=== March ===
- March 12 – At least 18 African countries, including Cameroon, Gabon, and Democratic Republic of the Congo (DRC) report cases of the novel coronavirus. Most are in single figures, and no deaths have been reported in Sub-Saharan Africa.
- March 15 – In a historic first, all Peace Corps volunteers worldwide are withdrawn from their host countries.
- March 22 – 92 Chadian soldiers are killed by Boko Haram in Lac province. 24 military vehicles are destroyed.

=== April ===
- April 8 – The Democratic Republic of the Congo declares is it is Ebola free. However, two days later a new case is reported.
- April 12 – Easter Sunday in Beni, Democratic Republic of the Congo is somber as the community struggles with both COVID-19 and its second new case of Ebola. The coronavirus is more contagious but Ebola is more often fatal; the struggle against both is hampered by insurrection in the country.
- April 13 – 14,000 cases of COVID-19 and 788 deaths have been reported across Africa. Cases by country: Cameroon – 820, Central African Republic – 8, Chad – 19, Congo-Brazzaville – 70, DR Congo – 234, Equatorial Guinea – 21, Gabon – 49
- April 15 – Finance ministers from the Group of 20 agree to put a hold on debt service by poor countries so they can concentrate their efforts on health service and ending the pandemic. 76 countries will be able to participate in the plan, including 40 from Sub-Saharan Africa. $8 billion in private loans and $12 billion in loans from other countries will be frozen for the remainder of 2020 and possibly beyond. Another $12 billion in multilateral loans from organizations such as the World Bank is also under consideration.
- April 16 – Forty-four suspected members of Boko Haram are found dead in a cell in a prison in Chad, apparently poisoned. The men were among 58 prisoners placed in a single cell in Ndjamena and were not given anything to eat or drink for two days.
- April 22 – The World Health Organization (WHO) warns that the number of malaria deaths in Africa may double this year as efforts to curb the disease wind down.
- April 24
  - Twelve rangers and at least five others are killed in an ambush near Virunga National Park in DR Congo. The assassins are believed to be FDLR rebels. The park is home to the endangered eastern gorilla (Gorilla beringei).
  - Eight people are killed, 35 injured, and 168 arrested, on a police raid of the Bundu dia Kongo sect that seeks to restore the historical Kingdom of Kongo. Eight officers were seriously injured in the raid.
- April 30 – At least 25 people are killed and 51 others wounded in clashes in the northeast of the Central African Republic.

=== May ===
- May 8 – Zimbabwe opens its tobacco season after a one-month delay because of the COVID-19 pandemic.
- May 13 – Six members of Cameroon's opposition party, the Cameroon Renaissance Movement (MRC), are arrested for distributing face masks and hand sanitisers in the capital, Yaoundé.
- May 19 – At least 40 people are killed by Allied Democratic Forces (ADC) rebels in Samboko, Ituri Province, DR Congo. Seventeen were killed in the nearby village of Makutano the day before.
- May 20: State Unification Day, Cameroon President Paul Biya, 87, addresses the nation after two months of silence. "The number of people infected rises day after day, bringing proof that the fight against the pandemic is complex and difficult," he said. Cameroon has had 3,500 cases including 140 deaths from COVID-19.

=== June ===
- June 1 – Authorities in DR Congo confirm a second Ebola outbreak, north of Mbandaka. There have also been 3,000 confirmed cases of COVID-19 and 72 deaths, while there have been 369,520 measles cases and 6,779 deaths since 2019.
- June 9 – A statue of King Leopold II of Belgium is knocked over in Ekeren, Antwerp, Belgium by protesters who object to his ties to colonialism in the Congo Free State.
- June 11 – COVID-19 pandemic: Nobel laureate-winning doctor Denis Mukwege quits the task force in eastern Congo, noting testing delays and organizational problems.
- June 12 – World Day Against Child Labor: The International Labour Organization and the UNICEF warn that millions of children are likely to be pushed into forced labor because of the economic fallout from the COVID-19 pandemic.
- June 27 – DR Congo justice minister, Celestin Tunda Ya Kasende, is arrested in crisis over judicial reforms. He was released hours later.
- June 30: Independence Day, Democratic Republic of the Congo

=== July and August ===
- July 12
  - Independence Day, São Tomé and Príncipe
  - Thousands of protesters march in Kinshasa, Bukavu, and Kananga; Democratic Republic of the Congo, against the selection of a new election chief aligned with former president Joseph Kabila. Five people were killed in similar protests on July 8.
- July 16 – Rose Christiane Raponda becomes Gabon's first female prime minister.
- July 20 – Ebola infections in western DR Congo increase to 60.
- July 25 – Former Central African Republic president François Bozizé announces his candidacy for president in the 2020 Central African general election.
- August 8 – Chadian President Idriss Deby says that Boko Haram has been driven from Chadian territory, but that the extremist group continues to wrack havoc in the Lake Chad area during nighttime excursions from Nigeria.
- August 11
  - Independence Day, Chad (from France, 1960) President Idriss Deby Itno is named a marshal in the country's first-ever military parade.
  - Angolan billionaire Isabel dos Santos resigns from Unitel amidst corruption charges.
- August 15
  - Independence Day, Republic of the Congo (from France, 1960)
  - Assumption of Mary, Public holiday in the Central African Republic
- August 17 – Independence Day, Gabon (from France, 1960)
- August 19 – Francisco Pascual Obama Asue is reappointed prime minister of Equatorial Guinea after resigning because of poor performance in a time of crisis. Obama will form a new government.
- August 21 – An ebola outbreak in Province of Équateur, DR Congo kills 43 and infects 100.
- August 23 – DR Congo continues exemptions to restrictions on the exportation of cobalt (Co), tin (Sn), tungsten (W), and tantalum (Ta) ore.
- August 25
  - The WHO reports wild polio eradication in Africa. The announcement was made by Tedros Adhanom Ghebreyesus and Matshidiso Moeti of WHO, Aliko Dangote, and Bill Gates.
  - DR Congo says the measles epidemic that killed 7,000 children under five has ended.
  - Gerard Mombaza Mombembo "the butcher of Nouabale Ndoki", 35, originally from the DR Congo, is sentenced to 30 years of hard labor for illegal hunting of elephants in Ouésso, Sangha Department, Congo.

=== September and October ===
- September 19 – Central African Republic Civil War: Eric Danboy Bagale, head of former Central African Republic president François Bozizé's guard and head of the mostly Christian anti-Balaka militias following Bozizé's ouster in 2013, is arrested for war crimes in relation to revenge killings.
- September 24 – Both the government's Rapid Intervention Battalion (BIR) and rebel groups are accused of rape and violence against women in Camaroon.
- October 12 – Independence Day, Equatorial Guinea (from Spain, 1968)

=== November and December ===
- November 1 – All Saints' Day, Public holiday in the Central African Republic
- November 11 – Independence Day, Angola (from Portugal, 1975)
- November 16 – COVID-19 pandemic: The United Nations World Food Programme (WFP) warns of famines in the developing world in 2021 as economic funds dry up.
- November 17 – At least thirty-six people are killed by the Allied Democratic Forces (ADF) in North Kivu province, Democratic Republic of the Congo.
- December 1 – Republic Day, Central African Republic
- December 6 – One person is killed during the first-ever regional elections in Cameroon.
- December 7 – Members of Parliament in the DR Congo react violently when President Felix Tshisekedi moves to form a new ruling coalition and hold special elections.
- December 15 – French Armed Forces are exposed for meddling in African politics with 84 fake accounts on Facebook and 14 on Instagram. Russia has also used social media to meddle in African politics.
- December 21 – Troops from Russia and Rwanda are rushed to the Central African Republic to forestall a coup.

=== Predicted and scheduled events ===
- December 27 – Central African Republic elections for president and parliament
- TBA: Gabon Senate election, late 2020 or early 2021

== Culture ==
=== Fashion ===
- May 24 – Congolese designer Anifa Mvuemba releases the latest collection for her fashion brand, Hanifa, on Instagram, using virtual models.

=== Sports ===
- November 29, 2019 – 1 February 1, 2020: 2019–20 CAF Champions League group stage
- December 1, 2019 – 2 February 2, 2020: 2019–20 CAF Confederation Cup group stage
- January – Groups are announced for the 2022 FIFA World Cup qualification in October.
- January 5 – 9: Volleyball at the 2020 Summer Olympics – Women's African qualification, Yaoundé, Cameroon
- January 17 – June 21: 2020 African U-20 Women's World Cup Qualifying Tournament
- April 20 – 20 October 20: 2020 African Nations Championship qualification, Cameroon
- May TBA – Finals of 2020 African U-17 Women's World Cup Qualifying Tournament Began January 2020
- June 21 – Finals of 2020 African U-20 Women's World Cup Qualifying Tournament
- October 9, 2019 – 8 September 2020: 2021 Africa Cup of Nations qualification, Cameroon
- October 5 – 12: 2022 FIFA World Cup qualification – CAF second round
- December 2 – 12: 2020 African Women's Handball Championship

== Deaths ==
=== January to March ===
- January 6 – Aloïse Moudileno-Massengo, 86, Congolese politician and lawyer, Vice President (1971–1972)
- January 23 – Bertrand Teyou, 50, Cameroonian author.
- January 28 – Léon Mokuna, 91, Congolese football player (Sporting, Gent) and manager (national team)
- February 2 – Mad Mike Hoare, 100, British mercenary leader (Congo Crisis, Operation Angela).
- February 4 – Donatien Mavoungou, 72, Gabonese physician and fraudster.
- February 6 – André Neles, 42, Brazilian-Equatorial Guinean footballer (Botafogo Futebol Clube, São Carlos, Equatorial Guinea national team).
- March 7 – Adamou Ndam Njoya, 77, Cameroonian author and politician, founder and president of the Cameroon Democratic Union (since 1991), mayor of Foumban (1996–2020).
- March 19 – Aurlus Mabélé, 66, Congolese singer and composer, stroke and COVID-19.
- March 20 – Victor Fotso, 93, Cameroonian politician and businessman, Mayor of Bandjoun (since 1996).
- March 24 – Manu Dibango, 86, Cameroonian saxophonist ("Soul Makossa"), COVID-19.
- March 28 – Jean-Claude Ganga, 86, Congolese sports administrator (International Olympic Committee)
- March 30 – Joachim Yhombi-Opango, 81, Congolese politician, President (1977–1979) and Prime Minister (1993–1996), COVID-19.

=== April to June ===
- April 8
  - Miguel Jones, 81, Equatoguinean-born Spanish soccer player (Barakaldo, Indautxu, Atlético Madrid); COVID-19
  - François Luc Macosso, 81, Congolese politician
- April 9 – Simplice Guédet Manzela, 71, Gabonese politician.
- April 12 – Samuel Wembé, 73, Cameroonian businessman and politician; COVID-19 (b. January 1, 1947)
- April 15 – Gérard Mulumba Kalemba, 82, Congolese Roman Catholic prelate, Bishop of Mweka (1989–2017), COVID-19.
- April 14 – Kasongo wa Kanema, 73, Congolese musician (Orchestra Super Mazembe).
- May 10 – Ashu Priestley Ojong, 34, Cameroonian politician, mayor of Mamfe (since 2020); shot
- May 21 – Frankline Ndifor, 39, Camaroonian politician, pastor, and prophet; COVID-19
- May 25 – Joseph Bouasse, 21, Cameroonian footballer (Roma, Vicenza, Universitatea Cluj); heart attack.
- May (date unknown) – Raphael Yanyi, DR Congo judge; stabbed in the head
- June 11 – Emmanuel Issoze-Ngondet, 59, Gabonese politician, Prime Minister (2016–2019) and Minister of Foreign Affairs (2012–2016), asthma.
- June 12
  - Dodo Doris, 71, Congolese musician (Orchestra Super Mazembe); chest complications.
  - Claude Ndam, 65, Cameroonian singer-songwriter.
- June 14
  - Nguea Laroute, 59–60, Cameroonian Makossa singer; diabetes.
  - Pierre Lumbi, 70, Congolese politician, Senator (since 2016); COVID-19.

=== July to September ===
- July 8 – Santiago Nchama, 70, Equatoguinean politician, Minister of Foreign Affairs (1999–2003).
- July 16
  - Gladys Ejomi, Cameroonian physician.
  - Delphine Zanga Tsogo, 84, Cameroonian writer, feminist and politician, Deputy (1965–1972).
- July 24 – Kundi Paihama, 75, Angolan politician, MP (since 2018).
- July 31 – Stephen Tataw, 57, Cameroonian footballer (Tonnerre Yaoundé, Olympic Mvolyé, national team).
- August 9 – Waldemar Bastos, 66, Angolan musician; cancer.
- August 24 – Pascal Lissouba, 88, Congolese politician, President (1992–1997) and Prime Minister (1963–1966), complications from Alzheimer's disease.
- September 19 – Ephrem M'Bom, 66, Cameroonian footballer (Canon Yaoundé, national team).

=== October to December ===
- November 19 – Alcino Pinto, 64, São Toméan politician, President of the National Assembly (2012–2014).
- December 1 – Jean-Pierre Lola Kisanga, 51, Congolese politician.

== See also ==
- 2020 in East Africa
- 2020 in North Africa
- 2020 in Southern Africa
- 2020 in West Africa
- 2020 Democratic Republic of the Congo attacks
- Community of Sahel–Saharan States
- 2020 in politics and government
- COVID-19 pandemic in Africa
- 2020s
- 2020s in political history
- List of sovereign states and dependent territories in Africa
- United Nations geoscheme
- List of George Floyd protests outside the United States
