= Alain Claude Bilie By Nze =

Prime Minister of Gabon in 2023

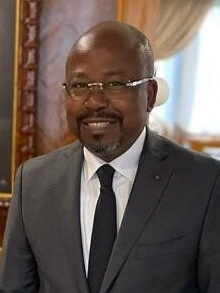
- By Nze in 2023

13th Prime Minister of Gabon
- In office 9 January 2023 – 30 August 2023
- President: Ali Bongo
- Preceded by: Rose Christiane Raponda
- Succeeded by: Raymond Ndong Sima

Deputy Prime Minister of Gabon
- In office October 2022 – 9 January 2023
- Prime Minister: Rose Christiane Raponda

Minister of Communications
- In office 2006–2007
- President: Omar Bongo

Member of the National Assembly of Gabon
- In office 2006–2011

Personal details
- Born: 16 September 1967 (age 59) Makokou, Gabon
- Education: Omar Bongo University

Alain Claude Bilie By Nze (born 16 September 1967) is a Gabonese politician who was the Prime Minister of Gabon from 9 January 2023 until 30 August 2023 when he was deposed in the 2023 coup d'état.

== Biography ==
By Nze was born on 16 September 1967 in Makokou. He studied literature at Omar Bongo University in Libreville.

== Career ==
In 2006, he was appointed Minister of Communications, and was elected to Gabon's National Assembly, leaving the latter office in 2011 and the former in 2007, which he left to become Deputy Minister of Transport. In March 2012, By Nze was made an advisor to the President and the government's spokesperson.

By Nze became Communications Minister for a second time in 2015, and was additionally made Minister of State, Minister of the Digital Economy, and Minister of Culture and the Arts in October 2016. In 2018, By Nze was reappointed as Minister of State and Minister of Sports.

In July 2020, he became the Minister of State and the Minister of Energy and Water Resources. During a cabinet reshuffle in March 2022, he also became the government's official spokesperson, and in October 2022, he became a Deputy Prime Minister. On 9 January 2023, By Nze was appointed Prime Minister of Gabon, replacing Rose Christiane Raponda, who resigned to become Vice President.

By Nze ran for president of Gabon in the 2025 Gabonese general election. He lost to the incumbent transitional president Brice Oligui Nguema, having won only 3.02% of the vote.

In May 2025, By Nzé called for dialogue, following the decision of the International Court of Justice (ICJ) in favor of the restitution of three islets to Equatorial Guinea, against Gabon.

In 2026, By Nzé was arrested over unpaid debts amounting to CFA5 million ($8,999) incurred from organizing the National Cultural Festival in 2008.
