= Daniel Ona Ondo =

Gabonese politician

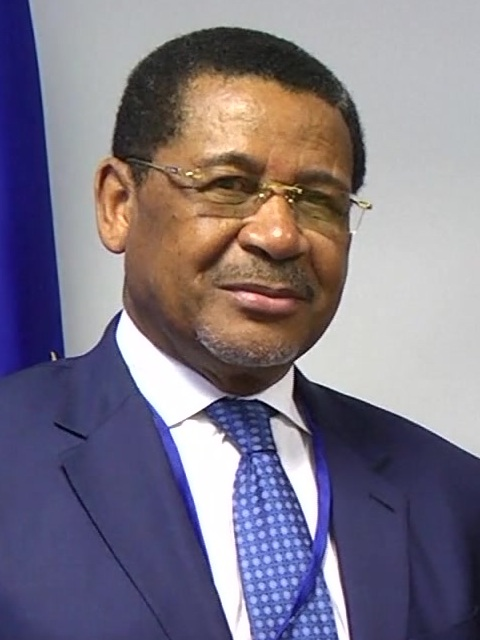
- Ona Ondo in April 2019

9th Prime Minister of Gabon
- In office 27 January 2014 – 29 September 2016
- President: Ali Bongo Ondimba
- Preceded by: Raymond Ndong Sima
- Succeeded by: Emmanuel Issoze-Ngondet

Personal details
- Born: 10 July 1945 (age 81) Oyem, Gabon
- Party: Democratic Party
- Education: University of Picardie; Pantheon-Sorbonne University

Daniel Ona Ondo (born 10 July 1945) is a Gabonese politician who was Prime Minister of Gabon from January 2014 to September 2016. He previously served as Minister of Education and First Vice-President of the National Assembly. He is a member of the Gabonese Democratic Party (Parti démocratique gabonais, PDG).

== Political career ==
Ona Ondo taught at the Omar Bongo University in Libreville and was appointed as an adviser to President Omar Bongo in 1990; he also became Rector of Omar Bongo University in 1990. He was elected to the National Assembly in the December 1996 parliamentary election, and he was then appointed to the government as Minister-Delegate under the Minister of Health and Population in 1997. Subsequently, he was Minister of Culture, Arts, Popular Education, Youth, and Sports from 1999 to 2002 before being appointed as Minister of National Education on 27 January 2002. In a partial parliamentary election held on 26 May 2002, he won the fourth seat from Woleu Department as a PDG candidate, receiving 65.62% of the vote.

He was elected to the National Assembly in the December 2006 parliamentary election as the PDG candidate for the fourth seat in Woleu Department. Following that election, he was elected as First Vice-President of the National Assembly on 26 January 2007.

On 25 June 2009, following the death of President Bongo, Ona Ondo said on Radio France Internationale that he intended to seek the PDG's nomination as its candidate for the planned presidential election. He was the first person to confirm that he intended to seek the nomination. Although he said that he intended to only run if he won the PDG nomination, it was noted that he made the announcement publicly without adhering to party guidelines intended to ensure unity and discipline.

Ona Ondo was re-elected as First Vice-President of the National Assembly on 27 February 2012. Following local elections in December 2013, President Ali Bongo appointed Ona Ondo as Prime Minister on 24 January 2014, replacing Raymond Ndong Sima. He took office on 27 January.

A new, expanded government headed by Ona Ondo, with 41 members, was appointed on 11 September 2015. Its composition was viewed in the context of the forthcoming 2016 presidential election. An opposition leader, Jean De Dieu Mukagni Iwangu of the Union of the Gabonese People, was appointed as Minister of State for Agriculture, although he declined the post and a rival leader from the same party, Mathieu Mboumba Nziengui, was appointed instead. Some senior figures in the PDG who were prominent under Omar Bongo and influential in their native regions also returned to the government: Paul Biyoghé Mba was appointed as First Deputy Prime Minister for Health, and Flavien Nziengui Ndzoundou was appointed as Deputy Prime Minister for Vocational Training.

Following the disputed re-election of President Bongo in the August 2016 presidential election and Bongo's swearing-in on 27 September 2016, Ona Ondo submitted the resignation of his government on 28 September in preparation for the appointment of a new government. Emmanuel Issoze-Ngondet, who served under Ona Ondo as Minister of Foreign Affairs, was appointed to replace Ona Ondo as Prime Minister on the same day.

At a meeting of leaders of the Economic and Monetary Community of Central Africa (CEMAC) in February 2017, Ona Ondo was designated as President of the CEMAC Commission, succeeding Pierre Moussa of Congo-Brazzaville.

In December 2024, the CEMAC Community Court of Justice ruled in favor of Daniel Ona Ondo, recognizing the legality of the exceptional end-of-term bonuses awarded under his administration of the CEMAC presidency.

Political offices
Preceded by Raymond Ndong Sima	Prime Minister of Gabon; 2014–2016	Succeeded by Emmanuel Issoze-Ngondet
