= Rose Christiane Raponda =

Vice President of Gabon in 2023

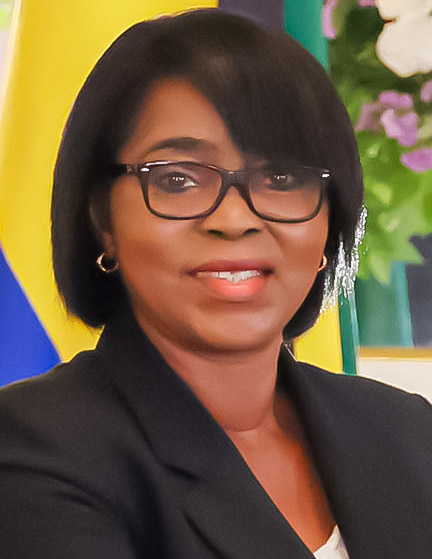
- Raponda in 2022

6th Vice President of Gabon
- In office 9 January 2023 – 30 August 2023
- President: Ali Bongo Ondimba
- Preceded by: Pierre Claver Maganga Moussavou (2019)
- Succeeded by: Joseph Owondault Berre

12th Prime Minister of Gabon
- In office 16 July 2020 – 9 January 2023
- President: Ali Bongo Ondimba
- Preceded by: Julien Nkoghe Bekale
- Succeeded by: Alain Claude Bilie By Nze

Minister of National Defense
- In office 12 February 2019 – 16 July 2020
- President: Ali Bongo Ondimba
- Prime Minister: Julien Nkoghe Bekale
- Preceded by: Étienne Massard Kabinda Makaga
- Succeeded by: Michaël Moussa Adamo

Mayor of Libreville
- In office 26 January 2014 – 12 February 2019
- Preceded by: Jean-François Ntoutoume Emane
- Succeeded by: Léandre Nzué

Minister of Budget, Public Accounts and Civil Service
- In office 27 February 2012 – 25 January 2014
- President: Ali Bongo Ondimba
- Prime Minister: Raymond Ndong Sima

Personal details
- Born: 30 June 1963 (age 63) Franceville, Gabon
- Party: Gabonese Democratic Party
- Occupation: Economist

Rose Christiane Ossouka Raponda (born 30 June 1963) is a Gabonese politician who served as the vice president of Gabon from January to August 2023, making her the country's first female vice president. She previously served as Prime Minister of Gabon from July 2020 to January 2023, she was also the country's first female prime minister. She also served as the mayor of Libreville and later as the minister of national defense from February 2019 to July 2020.

== Background ==
Raponda was born on 30 June 1963 in Franceville. Raponda is a member of the Mpongwe people. Raponda received a degree in economics and public finance from the Gabonese Institute of Economy and Finance.

== Career ==
Raponda worked as Director General of the Economy and Deputy Director General the Housing Bank of Gabon. She served as minister of budget and public finance from February 2012 until January 2014. Raponda was elected mayor of the capital city Libreville on 26 January 2014, representing the ruling Gabonese Democratic Party. She was the first woman to hold the position since 1956 and she served until 2019. She also became president of United Cities and Local Governments Africa.

On 12 February 2019, Raponda was appointed the Minister of National Defense of Gabon by president Ali Bongo Ondimba after the failed coup in January 2019. Raponda replaced Etienne Massard Kabinda Makaga, a member of the Bongo family, who had held the position since 2016. On 16 July 2020, Raponda was appointed the Prime Minister of Gabon, after her predecessor Julien Nkoghe Bekale stepped down. She is the first woman to hold the position. Her appointment was the fourth cabinet shuffle by Ondimba since the failed coup and occurred amid the dual health and economic crises due to the COVID-19 pandemic and the fall in the price of oil, one of the country's main resources.

On 30 August 2023 another coup succeeded, and Raponda was removed from power.

Political offices
Preceded by Julien Nkoghe Bekale	Prime Minister of Gabon; 2020–2023	Succeeded by Alain Claude Bilie By Nze
Preceded by Pierre Claver Maganga Moussavou	Vice President of Gabon; 2023	Succeeded by Joseph Owondault Berre
