= Emmanuel Issoze-Ngondet =

Gabonese diplomat and politician (1961–2020)

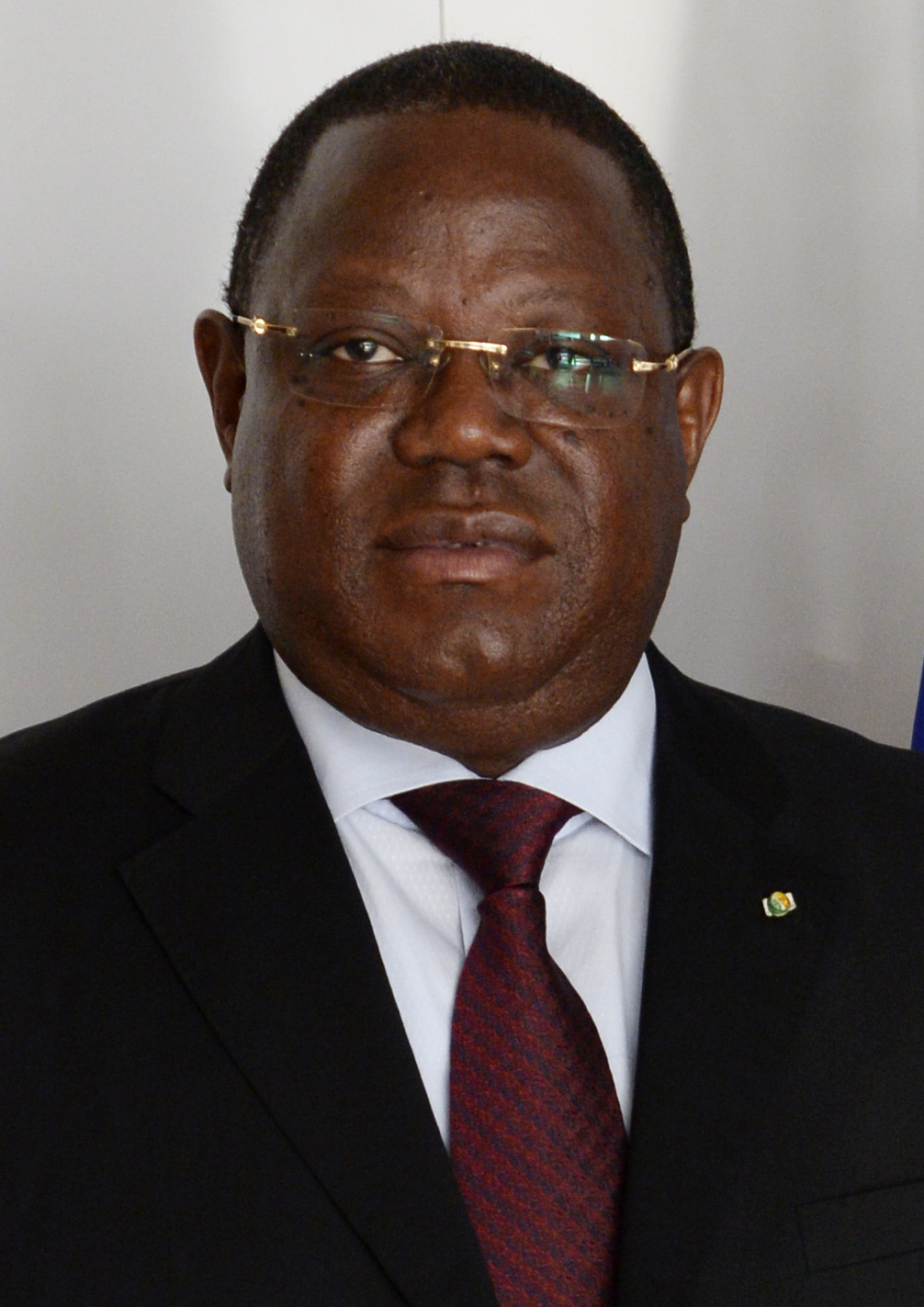
- Issoze-Ngondet in February 2015

10th Prime Minister of Gabon
- In office 29 September 2016 – 12 January 2019
- President: Ali Bongo Ondimba
- Preceded by: Daniel Ona Ondo
- Succeeded by: Julien Nkoghe Bekale

Minister for Foreign Affairs
- In office 28 February 2012 – 28 September 2016
- Prime Minister: Raymond Ndong Sima; Daniel Ona Ondo
- Preceded by: Paul Toungui
- Succeeded by: Pacôme Moubelet-Boubeya

Personal details
- Born: Franck Emmanuel Issoze-Ngondet; 2 April 1961 Makokou, Gabon
- Died: 11 June 2020 (aged 59) Libreville, Gabon
- Party: Democratic Party

Franck Emmanuel Issoze-Ngondet (2 April 1961 – 11 June 2020) was a Gabonese diplomat and politician who served as Prime Minister of Gabon from 2016 to 2019.

A career diplomat, Issoze-Ngondet served as Gabon's Permanent Representative to the United Nations from August 2008 to January 2009. He then joined the country's government as Minister of Energy from January 2009 to June 2009 and then briefly as Minister of Relations with Parliament in mid-2009, before returning to the post of Permanent Representative to the UN in November 2009. In March 2010, Issoze-Ngondet was the President of the United Nations Security Council. He returned to domestic politics in 2012 as Minister of Foreign Affairs, a post he held for over four years. In September 2016, Issoze-Ngondet was appointed prime minister by Ali Bongo Ondimba. He remained in that role until 2019.

== Diplomatic and political career ==
Emmanuel Issoze-Ngondet was born in Makokou, Ogooué-Ivindo Province in Gabon on 2 April 1961 and was a member of the Kota ethnic group. He began working at the Ministry of Foreign Affairs and Cooperation in 1988; initially he was an Adviser to the Ministry, and he was then Studies Officer (Chargé d'études) at the Division of Treaties and International Conventions from 1988 to 1990. He was posted in Yaoundé as Cultural Counsellor at Gabon's Embassy to Cameroon from 1990 to 1991, and he was First Counsellor at the Embassy to the United Kingdom from 1991 to 1993. Subsequently, he was First Counsellor at the Embassy to Canada from 1993 to 1994 and First Counsellor at the Embassy to Germany from 1994 to 1997.

Issoze-Ngondet was the Foreign Ministry's Director for the Americas from 1997 to 1998 and was its Director for Europe from 1998 to 2000. He was then posted in Seoul as Ambassador to South Korea from 2000 to 2006; during that time, he was additionally accredited as Ambassador to Thailand beginning in 2003 and as Ambassador to the Philippines beginning in 2004.

In June 2006, Issoze-Ngondet was posted to Addis Ababa as Ambassador to Ethiopia as well as Permanent Representative to the African Union, the United Nations Economic Commission for Africa, and the United Nations Environment Programme. He was additionally appointed as Ambassador to Kenya in August 2007, while continuing to reside in Addis Ababa. During the same period, Issoze-Ngondet was also the Chairman of the African Union's Sub-Committee on Refugees, Returnees and Internally Displaced Persons. Amidst discussions regarding the creation of a United States of Africa in early 2008, he suggested that Gabon's place in the proposed continental state could be comparable to California's place in the United States. Acknowledging with amusement that Gabon was not comparable to California in size, he then suggested that it might instead be comparable to Los Angeles.

After two years as Permanent Representative to the African Union, Issoze-Ngondet was sent to New York City as Permanent Representative to the United Nations, presenting his credentials to UN Secretary-General Ban Ki-moon on 25 August 2008. He was Permanent Representative to the UN for only a few months before being appointed to the Gabonese government as Minister of Energy, Hydraulic Resources, and New Energies on 14 January 2009. Following the death of President Omar Bongo on 8 June 2009, he was moved to the post of Minister of Relations with Parliament and the Constitutional Institutions on 19 June 2009; however, he was dismissed from the government a month later, on 22 July 2009.

At the time of the August 2009 presidential election, Issoze-Ngondet was the coordinator of Ali Bongo's campaign in Ogooué-Ivindo Province. After Bongo won the election, he appointed Issoze-Ngondet to his former post as Permanent Representative to the UN on 5 November 2009.

Issoze-Ngondet was appointed as Minister of Foreign Affairs, replacing Paul Toungui, on 28 February 2012. He was promoted to the rank of Minister of State for Foreign Affairs, La Francophonie and Regional Integration on 11 September 2015. Following the disputed re-election of President Bongo in the August 2016 presidential election, Bongo appointed Issoze-Ngondet as prime minister on 28 September 2016. He took office at a ceremony on 29 September 2016, succeeding Daniel Ona Ondo.

The new government that was headed by Issoze Ngondet was appointed on 2 October 2016. Despite Bongo's earlier statements about forming an inclusive government, representatives of the opposition were largely absent; although Bruno Ben Moubamba, who placed a distant third in the election, was appointed as deputy prime minister, no one associated with the main opposition leader, Jean Ping, was included in the 40-member government.

Issoze Ngondet participated in the 2017 national political dialogue as a representative of the governing majority and acted as one of the two co-presidents for the majority, along with Faustin Boukoubi.

== Personal life and other activities ==
Issoze-Ngondet was married with six children. He wrote a French language novel, An Ascetic in the Court (Un Ascète dans la cour), which was published by L'Harmattan on 14 February 2007. A career diplomat, he spoke English in addition to French.

Political offices
Preceded by Daniel Ona Ondo	Prime Minister of Gabon; 2016–2019	Succeeded by Julien Nkoghe Bekale
