= Education in Gabon =

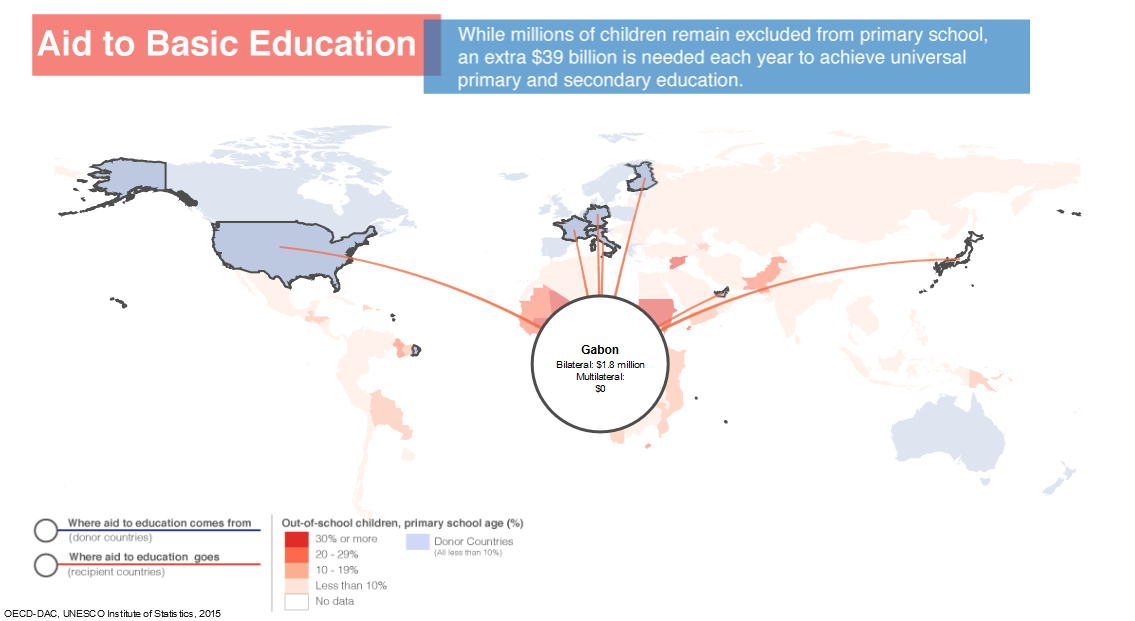
Aid to Basic Education, the amount of bilateral and multilateral aid contributed or received by Gabon

Education in Gabon is largely based on the French educational system. On the federal level, it is regulated by two Ministries: the Ministry of Education, which is in charge of pre-school education through to High School, and the Ministry of Higher Education and Innovative Technologies, which is in charge of universities and professional schools.

Education is compulsory for children ages 6 to 16 years under the Education Act. Most children in Gabon start their school lives by attending nurseries (Crèche), then kindergarten (Jardins d'Enfants). At age six, they are enrolled in primary school (école primaire) which is made up of five grades. The next level is secondary school (école secondaire), which is made up of seven grades. The intended age at graduation is 19 years. Graduates of secondary school can apply for universities or other institutions of higher learning, such as engineering schools or business schools.

Approximately 9.6% of Gabon's government budget goes to education, which is 3.0% of its GDP. The school life expectancy is 13 years, from Grade 1 to Grade 13. The baccalaureate is the second diploma of value. French is the language of education.

== Day care to secondary school ==
Primary school is composed of six grades: Cours Préparatoire (C.P.) 1 and 2, Cours Élémentaire (C.E.) 1 and 2, and Cours Moyen (C.M.) 1 and 2. The curriculum consists of French, mathematics, history, geography, civics, science, and physical education. Heavy emphasis is put on French and mathematics (12 hours each compared to an average of 3 hours each for the remaining sub, and an added arts and manual education class is introduced. This is in preparation for the Certificat d'Études Primaires (CEP) national exam, which officially sanctions primary school graduation. In addition the Concours d'Entrée en sixième is used to determine in which public secondary schools students will be routed, based on their performance. It is also used for determining eligibility to the secondary school stipend. The simplest way to graduate from primary school is to pass both the CEP and Concours, and be less than 13 years old.

Gabon's main cities of Libreville, Port-Gentil, Franceville, Oyem, Mouila, and Tchibanga account for more than 95% of all day care and pre-kindergarten schools in the country. As a result, there is a difference in skill and age among children introduced to C.P.1. This difference results in the average age of students from rural areas being higher per grade level than the average age of students from cities.

== Secondary school ==
Secondary school consists of seven grades: sixième (6e), cinquième (5e), quatrième (4e), troisième (3e), seconde (2nde), première (1ere) and terminale (tle). The first four grades are called "Collège" or "Premier Cycle". Premier Cycle and Second Cycle combined make up a "Lycée". In the last Collège grade, 3e, students are enrolled in a national exam called "Brevet d'Études du premier cycle" (B.E.P.C.). This exam originally served to determine eligibility to enroll in the Second Cycle, but is now only used to obtain an official diploma, as students go to 2nde based solely on their 3e grades. Secondary school graduation is sanctioned by a national exam called "Baccalauréat".

There are several types of secondary schools in Gabon. The most common schools are general education and technical education public Lycées and Collèges, such as the Lycée National Leon Mba (LNLM), the Collège Bessieux, or the Lycée Technique National Omar Bongo (LTNOB) and the Collège d'Enseignement Technique, which is part of LTNOB. The second group consists of private secondary schools and the third is made up of international schools such as the Lycée Blaise Pascal, which add international topics to their curriculum and also prepare students for international diplomas. All public and private secondary schools are required by the government to identify a school uniform for students to wear. The only schools that are not required to impose a uniform are international schools.

== Admission and assessment ==
To be enrolled in 6e in a general education public secondary school, students must be at most 13 years old and pass the CEP. Distribution in the schools is done by education boards, based on exam grades. The Concours was introduced to determine eligibility for the secondary school stipend, which, as of the 1970s, is being distributed to any student enrolled in a public secondary school, who maintains a passing grade every trimester. Students who do not pass the CEP must repeat the year regardless of their class grades. Students who failed in two successful years are not allowed to enroll in public school. In addition, students who are older than 13 are not allowed into general education public secondary school, regardless of their exam grades. Those students are routed to a technical school where they can learn a trade in 4 years, the most common certificates from technical collèges being for mechanics, plumbers and electricians.

The option for students who do not meet the official requirements for public schools is to enroll in private schools, which have their own eligibility rules. There is no official requirement for transferring to a public school, thus many students who do not meet the requirements for entrance in 6e get back in the public school system through transfers at later grade levels. Classes that will take a national exam at the end of the school year, 6e and tle, also participate in a practice exam called examen blanc, in addition to the regular monthly assessments. The examen blanc is implemented by the school in which the students are enrolled. Aside from the practice exam, report cards are due every trimester.

== General baccalaureates ==
General baccalaureates include:

- A1 whose concentrations are French language, philosophy and mathematics;
- A2 whose concentrations are French language and foreign languages;
- B whose concentration is Economics;
- C whose concentrations are Mathematics and Physics;
- D whose concentrations are Mathematics, Physics and Biological and Earth Sciences;

== Technical baccalaureates ==
Technical baccalaureates include:

- E whose concentration is Mathematics and Technologies
- F1 whose concentration is Mechanical Construction;
- F2 whose concentration is Electronics;
- F3 whose concentration is Electrical Technologies;
- F4 whose concentration is Civil Engineering;
- G1 whose concentration is Administration
- G2 whose concentration is Management
- G3 whose concentration is Marketing

== Universities and higher institutions in Gabon ==
- Omar Bongo University
- University of Sciences and Technologies of Masuku (Université des Sciences et Techniques de Masuku)
- Health Sciences Medical School (Université des Sciences de la Santé)
- International Centre of Medical Research of Franceville (Centre International de Recherches Médicales de Franceville)
- Forestry National School, Libreville
- National School of Law (école nationale de magistrature)
- Higher School of Education (école normale supérieure)
- Secretary Learning National School (École Nationale de Secretariat)
- Polytechnic Engineering School of Masuku (École Polytechnique de Masuku)
- African Institute of Computer Science (Institut Africain d’Informatique)
- Business National Institute (Institut national des sciences de gestion)
- Institute of Economics and Finance (Institut de l’Economie et des Finances)
- National Administration School (École Nationale d'Administration)

== Academic scholarships for Gabon students ==
In 1967, the government of Gabon created an academic scholarship program for college eligible students. All students who passed the baccalaureate exams were eligible for a scholarship if accepted at any public or private university anywhere in the world. The scholarship provided full tuition support and housing and food assistance to students. Funding for the program came from the budget of the Ministry of Finance.

In 1981, the government created a free standing agency "Direction Generale des Bourses et Stages"(DGBS), to regulate and administer the scholarship. The DGBS introduced several reforms to the program, the most notable in 1990, which set stricter rules for eligibility.

== La Bourse and other government programs ==
The government of Gabon has implemented several programs dating back to the late 1960s aimed at encouraging education. The most enduring program of the Ministry of Education is the secondary education stipend. Primary school students who pass the CEP and the Concours are eligible once enrolled in 6e for a government stipend delivered every trimester, as long as they maintain a passing overall grade throughout their secondary path. Students who did not pass the Concours are not allowed the stipend on the first trimester in 6e, but become eligible as long as they maintain a passing grade thereafter. Funding for the stipend comes from the Ministry of Education budget. The stipend is commonly referred to as La Bourse and is the most popular program among students, who have started riots when the government failed to deliver the money on time. The second most popular program has been free bussing of any students wearing a school uniform. This program is very popular among parents due to the long distances children have to travel to go to school. A proposal in 2006 to terminate the program drew the ire of parents and then President Omar Bongo personally guaranteed the program would go on.

Another program was to deliver school supplies to primary and secondary school students at the beginning of the school year. This program was stopped in 1990 due to lack of funding. Yet another program was the delivery and administration of school uniforms to all students enrolled in public schools. This program has been stopped several times, but has been revived as of the 2010–2011 school year.
