= Omar Bongo Technical High School =

Location
- Libreville; Gabon
- Coordinates: 0.4372°N 9.4421°E

Information
- Type: Technical high school
- Grades: KG1 – 12
- Enrollment: 6,000

Omar Bongo Technical High School (French: Lycée Technique Nationale Omar Bongo) is situated in Libreville, Gabon.

It is among the largest secondary schools in Gabon with some 6,000 students. The technical school is named after Omar Bongo (1935 – 2009), former President of Gabon.

The school was temporarily shut down in January 2004 because of student lawlessness and the invasion of another school. A subsequent inquiry found that corruption and prostitution were endemic in the school.

== See also ==
- Education in Gabon
