= Alexandre Barro Chambrier =

Gabonese politician

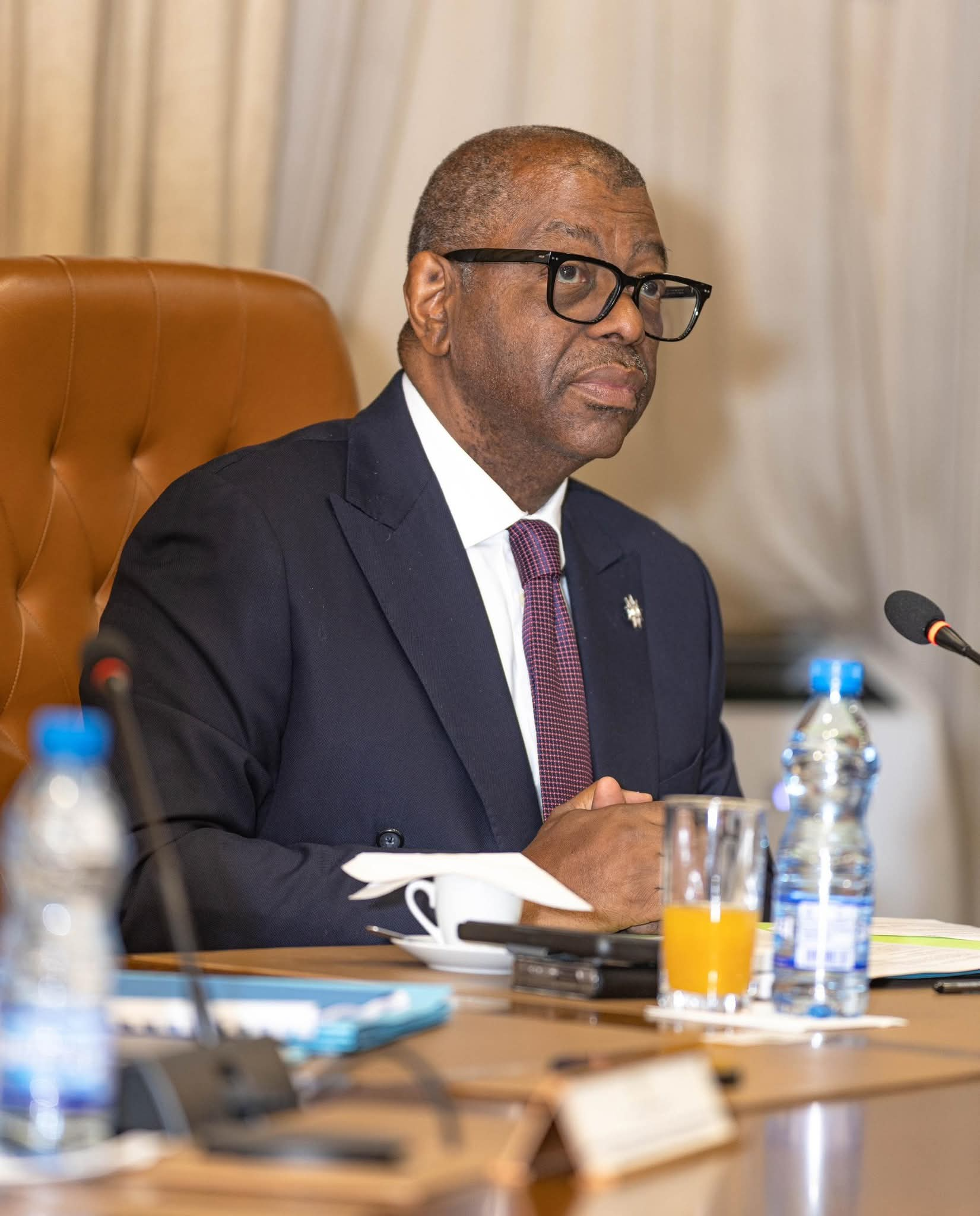

9th Vice President of Gabon
- Incumbent
- Assumed office 1 January 2026
- President: Brice Oligui Nguema
- Preceded by: Séraphin Moundounga

Vice President of the Government
- In office 5 May 2025 – 14 November 2025
- President: Brice Oligui Nguema
- Vice President: Séraphin Moundounga
- Preceded by: Raymond Ndong Sima (as Prime Minister)
- Succeeded by: Henri-Claude Oyima (interim)

90th Minister of Oil, Mining and Hydrocarbon
- In office 14 January 2011 – February 2012
- Succeeded by: Etienne Dieudonné Ngoubou

91st Executive Director of IMF
- In office 1998 – October 2002
- Succeeded by: Ondo Mane Damian

Personal details
- Born: 25 August 1958 (age 67) Paris, France
- Party: Rally for the Fatherland and Modernity
- Spouse: Helena Lydia Barro Chambrier
- Children: 5
- Parent: Marcel Éloi Rahandi Chambrier (father)
- Education: Université Paris IX Dauphine

Alexandre Barro Chambrier (born 25 August 1958) is a Gabonese politician served as vice president of the government of Gabon in 2025. Prior to his tenure as vice president of the government he was Deputy Prime Minister, Minister of Oil, Mining and Hydrocarbon, and Executive Director of the International Monetary Fund.

== Early life and education ==
Alexandre Barro Chambrier was born in Paris, France, on 25 August 1958, to Roselyne and Marcel Éloi Rahandi Chambrier. His father co-founded the Gabonese Democratic Party and was president of the National Assembly of Gabon. He graduated from Université Paris IX Dauphine with a degree in management sciences. He was an economics professor at the University of Libreville.

== Career ==
Chambrier was an economic advisor to the Ministry of Commerce and the Secretary of State for Culture and Francophonie from 1988 to 1990. He was an economic and financial advisor to Prime Minister Casimir Oyé-Mba from 1990 to 1994. From 1994 to 2002, he was alternate administrator and then administrator of the International Monetary Fund.

From 2004 to 2009, Chambrier worked for the multiple ministries dealing with the environment and economy. On 14 January 2011, he was appointed as Minister of Oil, Mining and Hydrocarbon.

The coup d'état against President Ali Bongo was supported by Chambrier, but he called for Albert Ondo Ossa to be installed as president. On 22 January 2024, he was appointed as Deputy Prime Minister. President Brice Oligui Nguema appointed Chambrier as vice president of the government on 5 May 2025.

Chambrier supported Jean Ping in the 2016 presidential election. He is the chair of Rally for the Fatherland and Modernity and was its presidential candidate in the 2023 election.

== Personal life ==
Chambrier married Helena, the niece of Antoinette Sassou Nguesso and with it related to the Bongo family he is also father of five children.

== Works cited ==
=== News ===
- "Gabon: l'opposant Alexandre Barro Chambrier investi candidat du RPM à la présidentielle". Radio France Internationale. 9 July 2023. Archived from the original on 3 July 2025.
- Frenk, Carine (24 March 2023). "Présidentielle au Gabon: il y a «un recul démocratique», dénonce Alexandre Barro Chambrier". Radio France Internationale. Archived from the original on 12 May 2023.
- Goma, Yves-Laurent (18 January 2024). "Gabon: l'opposant Alexandre Barro Chambrier nommé vice-Premier ministre". Radio France Internationale. Archived from the original on 3 July 2025.
- Németh, Sébastien (25 January 2024). "Alexandre Barro Chambrier, vice-Premier ministre: l'objectif est de «remettre le Gabon en ordre de marche»". Radio France Internationale. Archived from the original on 3 July 2025.
- Tagba, Kamailoudini (5 May 2025). "Gabon's New Leader Appoints Two Vice Presidents to Government". Bloomberg News.
- Olivier, Mathieu (15 May 2018). "Gabon: quand les Chambrier rêvent du pouvoir". Jeune Afrique. Archived from the original on 3 July 2025.

=== Web ===
- "Alexandre Barro Chambrier". Africa Confidential. Archived from the original on 3 July 2025.
- "Le ministre". Ministry of Oil, Mining and Hydrocarbon of Gabon. Archived from the original on 17 December 2015.
