= Nathalie Yamb =

Cameroonian–Swiss activist and businesswoman

- Born: 22 July 1969 (age 57); La Chaux-de-Fonds, Switzerland
- Occupations: Activist and businesswoman

Nathalie Yamb is a Cameroonian-Swiss activist and businesswoman. She is best-known for opposing the actions of France in Africa, which she described as "colonial". She was born in Switzerland and grew up in Cameroon, then went to university in Germany.

== Activism and sanctions ==
In the 2010s, she helped run a political party in Ivory Coast. However, she was deported (to Switzerland) in 2019 without a trial after she criticized the Ivory Coast government at a conference in Russia. Yamb has been supported by Russian oligarch and mercenary leader Yevgeny Prigozhin. Her anti-French activism earned her in January 2022 a ban on entry and stay on French territory, made public in October 2022. Yamb participated as an "independent international observer" during 2022 referendums in Eastern Ukraine.

After her 2019 appearance at the Russian state sponsored Africa conference in Sochi, Yamb was categorized as an outspoken supporter of the Russian government under Vladimir Putin by the EU. The EU accuses her of undermining or threatening democracy. Yamb was sanctioned by the European Council and banned from entering or residing in the European Union. Her assets in the EU were frozen.

Yamb was in Africa when she got sanctioned by the EU, meaning she can not fly over EU territory to return to her residence in Zug, Switzerland. In a 2026 interview in Nairobi she stated to depend on the financial support from family and friends. She told reporters she fears French orchestrated assassination attempts.

== See also ==
- Speech by Nathalie Yamb in Sochi
