= Erlyne Antonella Ndembet =

Gabonese politician (born 1971)

- Born: 1971 (age 54–55); Nantes, France
- Occupation: Government minister

Erlyne Antonella Ndembet is a Gabonese politician and judge.

== Biography ==
Ndembet was born in Nantes in 1971.

She was the Minister of Justice of Gabon from December 2019 to 2023.
