= Julien Nkoghe Bekale =

Prime Minister of Gabon from 2019 to 2020

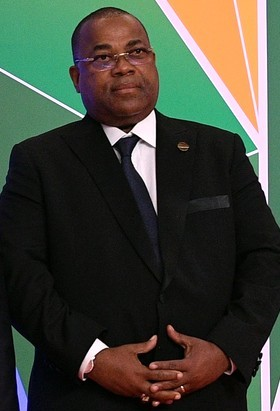
- Bekale in October 2019

11th Prime Minister of Gabon
- In office 12 January 2019 – 16 July 2020
- President: Ali Bongo Ondimba
- Preceded by: Emmanuel Issoze-Ngondet
- Succeeded by: Rose Christiane Raponda

Minister of Mines, Petroleum and Hydrocarbons
- In office 17 July 2009 – January 2011
- President: Rose Rogombé (interim)
- Prime Minister: Paul Biyoghe Mba
- Preceded by: Casimir Oyé Mba
- Succeeded by: Hugues Alexandre Barro Chambrier

Minister of Transport and Equipment
- In office 2011–2012
- President: Ali Bongo Ondimba
- Prime Minister: Paul Biyoghe Mba

Minister of Agriculture
- In office 2012–2014
- President: Ali Bongo Ondimba
- Prime Minister: Raymond Ndong Sima

Minister for Small and Medium-Sized Enterprises and Handicrafts
- In office 4 May 2018 – 23 July 2018
- President: Ali Bongo Ondimba
- Prime Minister: Emmanuel Issoze Ngondet
- Succeeded by: Carmen Ndaot

Minister for Labour, Employment and Vocational Training
- In office 23 July 2018 – 2019
- President: Ali Bongo Ondimba
- Prime Minister: Emmanuel Issoze Ngondet
- Preceded by: Arnaud Calixte Engandji Alandji

Deputy of the department of Komo Mondah
- Incumbent
- Assumed office 12 October 2018
- President: Ali Bongo Ondimba
- Prime Minister: Emmanuel Issoze Ngondet

Personal details
- Born: January 9, 1962 (age 64) Ntoum, Gabon (present day Gabon)
- Party: Gabonese Democratic Party

Julien Nkoghe Bekale (born 9 January 1962) is a Gabonese politician who served as the prime minister of Gabon from 2019 to 2020. In the aftermath of the 2019 Gabonese coup d'état attempt, he was appointed prime minister by president Ali Bongo Ondimba on 12 January 2019.

== Biography ==
Julien Nkoghe Bekalé studied at the Lycée d'Etat de l'Estuaire in Libreville, then at the Lycée technique Omar Bongo in Liberville where he obtained his baccalaureate in 1982. He then studied for a year at the seminary, with the aim of becoming a priest. But he finally changes his mind and reorientates himself in law with the aim of becoming a corporate lawyer. He studied at the University Omar Bongo, where he met Guy Rossatanga, then professor of law. He obtained his Master of Laws degree in 1986. Pushed by his teacher, Mr Antonio Rivera, he then joined the Libreville School of Magistracy, in cycle A. He studied there for one year, then joined the international section of the [National School of Magistracy]. He then returned to Gabon to take the oath of office on 7 October 1988 at the Libreville courthouse, in the presence of the President of the Republic. Omar Bongo Ondimba. He has been working as a magistrate for five years. He first held the position of prosecutor at the court of Franceville, for two years. He was then assigned as a judge at the court of Oyem for one year. Then he is deputy prosecutor at the court of Libreville for two years. In 1993, he was appointed legal adviser to Paul Biyoghe Mba, Minister of Privatisation and Reform of the Parapublic Sector. He remained in this position until 1995, when Paul Biyoghe Mba left the government. The latter then became his mentor in politics. He resumed his studies. He went to France, to the Centre d'Etudes Financières, Economiques et Bancaires de Marseille. He then obtains one and a DESS in Business Administration from the IAE de Paris 1, Université Panthéon-Sorbonne. He has three hats: that of a lawyer, a financier, and an economist. Before starting his political career, Julien Nkoghe Bekalé was Deputy Prosecutor, then Judge in the jurisdictions of Franceville, Oyem and Libreville. In 1993, he was appointed legal adviser to Paul Biyoghe Mba and then Deputy Secretary General of the Ministry and High Commissioner.

== Political career ==
Bekale is a member of the Gabonese Democratic Party. He has served ministerial positions under both Ali Bongo and Omar Bongo, such as minister for oil, gas, and hydrocarbons in 2009 and for transport and equipment in 2011. Bekale is a member of the Gabonese Democratic Party. He has served ministerial positions under both Ali Bongo and Omar Bongo, such as minister for oil, gas, and hydrocarbons in 2009 and for transport and equipment in 2011. From 2011 to 2012, he was Minister of Transport and Equipment. He then joined the Ministry of Agriculture, Livestock, Fisheries and Rural Development, from February 2012 to January 2014, in the government of Raymond Ndong Sima. On 4 May 2018, Julien Nkoghe Bekalé is appointed Minister of SMEs and Handicrafts in the government of Issoze Ngondet III. His aim was to increase the number of SMEs and help them grow. À la suite d’un remaniement par décret présidentiel, il quitte ce ministère le 23 juillet 2018. He is appointed Minister for Labour and Employment, with responsibility for Vocational Training, on 23 July 2018, to replace Arnaud Calixte Engandji Alandji. On 12 October 2018, Julien Nkoghe Bekalé was elected, in the first round, with 58.08% of the votes, deputy of the first seat of the department of Komo Mondah (commune of Ntoum) in his native province of the Estuary.

== Prime Minister of Gabon ==
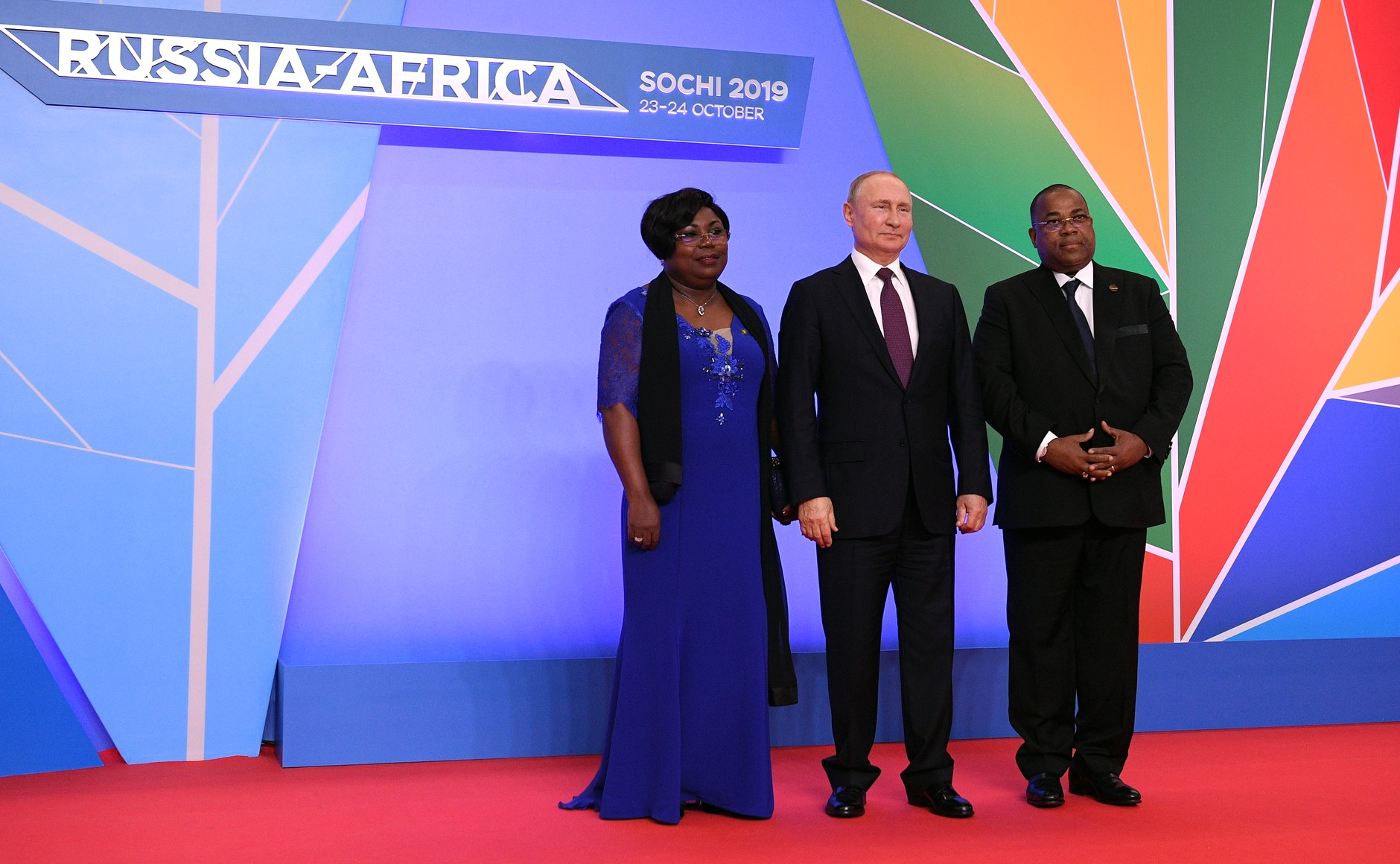
Bekale and his wife with Russian President Vladimir Putin at the Russia–Africa Summit in Sochi on 24 October 2019

After taking office as prime minister, Bekale named Emmanuel Norbert Tony Ondo Mba as the new energy minister, but did not make other changes to the government. He made the announcement naming his complete government on 12 January 2019 in Rabat, Morocco. He was dismissed on 16 July 2020, and replaced by Rose Christiane Raponda.

== Premiership ==
During his premiership, Julien Nkoghe Bekalé defended the reforms carried out by President Ali Bongo Ondimba, concerning, among other things, the reduction of expenditure, the diversification of the economy and the fight against inflation. The ministerial reshuffle of 10 June 2019 is testimony to this. To reduce state spending, the number of ministers was reduced from 38 to 28. Julien Nkoghe Bekalé has also created a Ministry of Investment Promotion to promote and facilitate investment and business creation in Gabon.

=== Decriminalization of homosexuality ===
Prime Minister Julien Nkoghe Bekale, introduced a bill decriminalizing homosexual acts, which had been banned in 2019. The bill passed in the National Assembly on 23 June 2020 and in the Senate on 29 June.

=== Amendment to the Penal Code ===
Julien Nkoghe Bekalé defended the draft amendment to Act No. 042/01 of 5 July 2019 on the Criminal Code of the Gabonese Republic, which repeals the Act of 1963. The aim of this reform, which came into force on 30 June 2020, is to strengthen the penal system in terms of good governance.

=== Fighting corruption ===
In order to combat corruption, a new ministry has also been established. The Ministry for the Promotion of Good Governance, the Fight against Corruption and the Evaluation of Public Policies was entrusted to Francis Nkea Ndzigue.

Political offices
Preceded by Emmanuel Issoze-Ngondet	Prime Minister of Gabon; 2019–2020	Succeeded by Rose Christiane Raponda
