= Séraphin Moundounga =

Gabonese politician

Dr Séraphin Moundounga
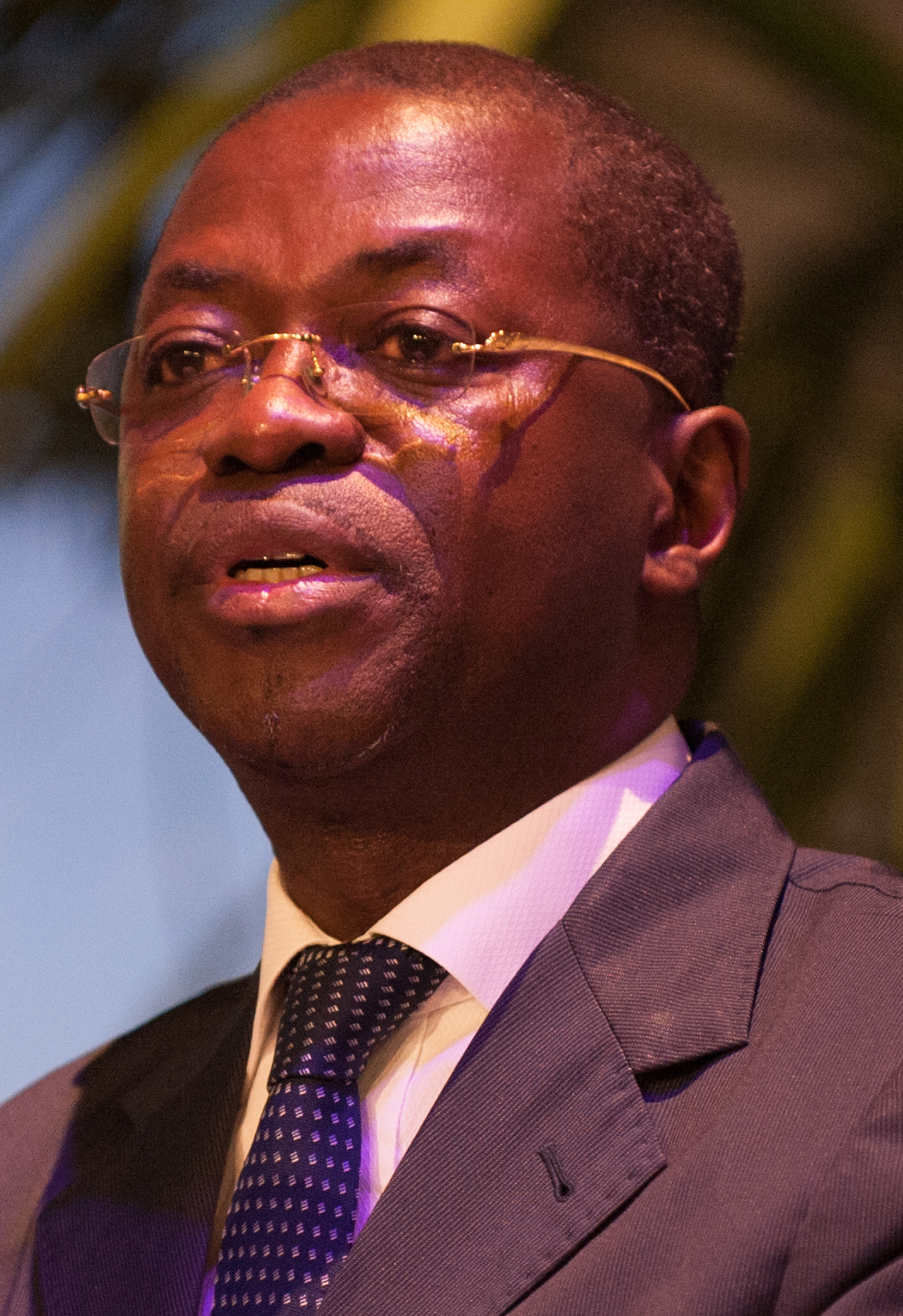
- Moundounga in 2015

8th Vice President of Gabon
- In office 5 May 2025 – 1 January 2026
- President: Brice Oligui Nguema
- Preceded by: Joseph Owondault Berre
- Succeeded by: Alexandre Barro Chambrier

Personal details
- Born: 29 February 1964 (age 62) Paris, France
- Party: Rally for the Fatherland and Modernity
- Education: Université de Paris IX Dauphine, Paris

Séraphin Moundounga OEE ONM (born 29 February 1964 in Tchibanga) is a Gabonese politician who is served as the vice president of Gabon from May 2025 until January 2026. He also served in the government of Gabon as Minister of Justice from 2014 to 2016.

== Biography ==
A member of the ruling Gabonese Democratic Party, he was first elected to the National Assembly of Gabon in the 1990 parliamentary election, and he was First Quaestor of the National Assembly from 1997 to 2009. From October 2009 to 2014 he served as Minister of National Education. One of his main projects was the renovation of the Omar Bongo University.

Séraphin Moundounga was appointed as Minister of Justice in January 2014. He resigned as Minister of Justice on 5 September 2016 after the government of President Ali Bongo Ondimba refused a recount of disputed votes in the 2016 presidential election. At the time of his resignation he was also Second Deputy Prime Minister. Moundounga went into exile in France shortly thereafter, alleging that the government orchestrated an invasion of his house on the night of 6–7 September; although he was not present at the house at time, he characterized it as an assassination attempt.

Settled in Europe, he became the President of the NGO UNITE (Union Pour la Nation l'Intégrité, le Travail et l'Égalité) and lobbied in favor of the revision of the Gabonese constitution. In July 2020, after a rumor of suicide spread in the Gabonese media, Moundounga's family confirmed that he was still alive and well.

On 5 May 2025, Moundounga was appointed as Vice President of Gabon.

Political offices
Preceded by Joseph Owondault Berre	Vice President of Gabon; 2025–present	Incumbent
