= Speech by Nathalie Yamb in Sochi =

2019 Russia–Africa Summit speech in Sochi

Nathalie Yamb's 2019 Russia–Africa Summit speech in Sochi was a public address delivered by Swiss-Cameroonian Pan-African influencer and political adviser Nathalie Yamb at the Russia–Africa Summit in Sochi, Russia, on 24 October 2019. The speech gained widespread attention for its criticism of French influence in Africa and its promotion of African sovereignty and alternative international partnerships. Yamb's intervention at the summit led to her being nicknamed the “Lady of Sochi”.

== Background ==
The Russia–Africa Summit brought together fifty heads of state and government leaders, along with political and economic representatives from across the African continent, to discuss issues related to development, investment, and international cooperation. Yamb participated as the Executive Adviser to Mamadou Koulibaly, leader of the Ivorian political party LIDER.

== Content ==
In her roughly 7-minute speech, Yamb criticized what she described as the continued neocolonial influence of France in francophone Africa, highlighting the CFA franc monetary system, French military bases, and other mechanisms of control. She emphasized Africa's economic and demographic potential, including its young population and natural resources, and argued that African countries should have the freedom to determine their own trade partners and development strategies without external interference.

Concerning the French military bases, for example, she said:

Nous voulons le démantèlement des bases militaires françaises, qui sous le couvert d’accords de défense bidon, ne servent qu’à permettre le pillage de nos ressources, l’entretien de rebellions, l’entrainement de terroristes et le maintien de dictateurs à la tête de nos Etats.

We want the dismantling of French military bases, which, under the cover of fake defense agreements, serve only to allow the plundering of our resources, the sustaining of rebellions, the training of terrorists, and the maintenance of dictators at the head of our states.

Yamb presented Russia as a partner capable of engaging in mutually beneficial cooperation, contrasting it with former colonial powers. She emphasized that Africa sought partners for investment, education, infrastructure, and military support, rather than new colonial masters. The speech also addressed the importance of political reform, democratization, and the empowerment of African youth.

== Reception ==
The speech reportedly provoked anger among French officials, including President Emmanuel Macron. It was widely circulated in African media and on social media platforms, where it was described as a “historic and masterful” intervention. Yamb's statements have been referenced in discussions regarding African sovereignty, francophone neocolonialism, and international partnerships.

== Legacy ==
The speech solidified Yamb's public image as “the Lady of Sochi” (“la dame de Sochi”), symbolizing African voices challenging neocolonial structures and advocating for alternative economic and political partnerships. She continued to participate in subsequent Russia–Africa forums, including the 2023 summit in St. Petersburg, maintaining her focus on African sovereignty and development.

== See also ==
- Françafrique
- Neocolonialism
- Kémi Séba
- Isaias Afwerki
