= Sophie Diouly =

Gabonese politician

Sophie Diouly (née Ngwamassana) is a Gabonese politician.

She served as Minister of Justice in 1987-1989.

She was the first woman cabinet minister in her country.
