= 2019 Russia–Africa Summit =

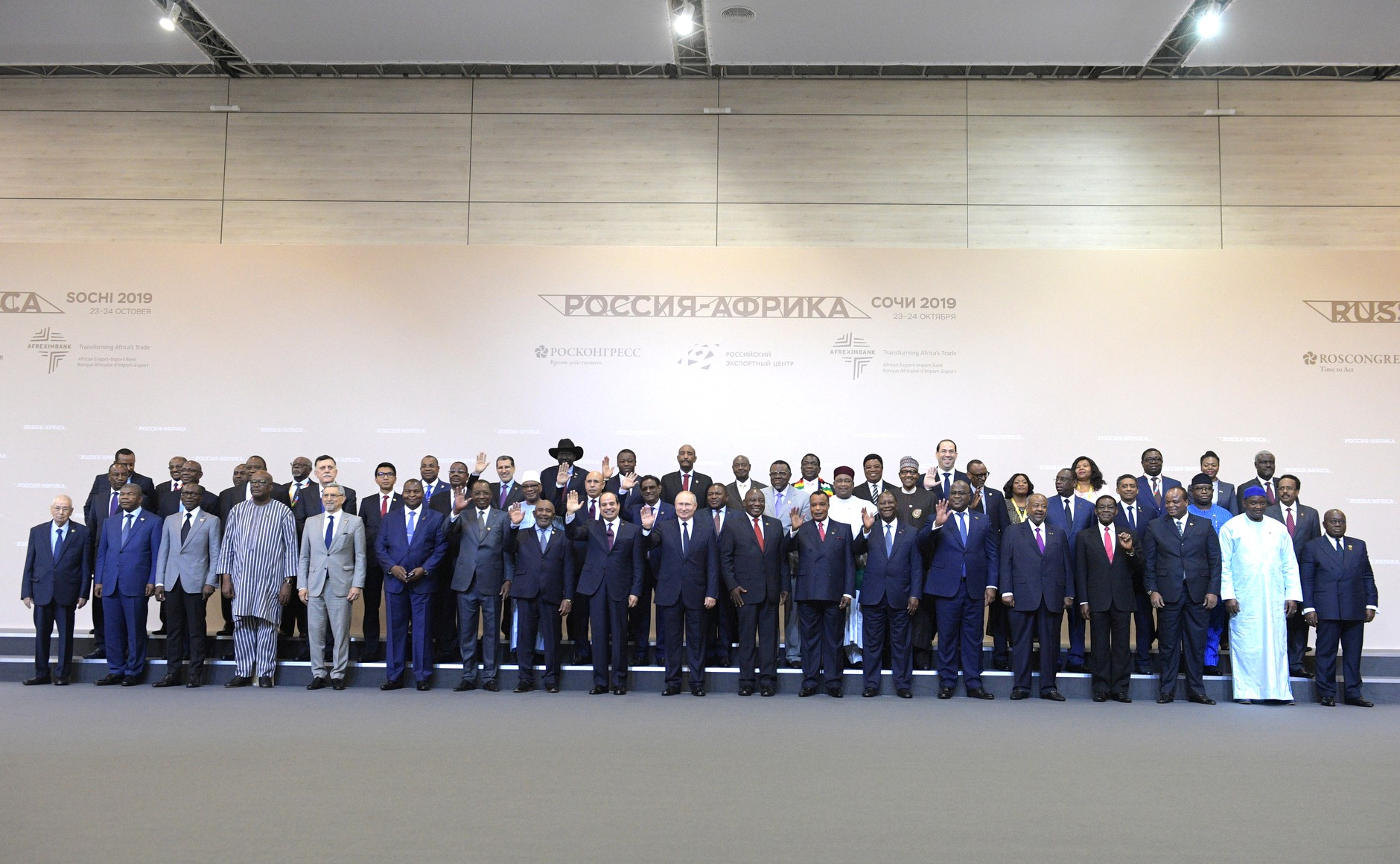
- The heads of delegations attending the Russia-Africa Summit in Sochi pose for photographs.
- Host country: Russia
- Date: 23–24 October, 2019
- Cities: Sochi
- Participants: Vladimir Putin; African Leaders
- Precedes: 2023 Russia–Africa Summit

The first Russia-Africa Summit was held on 23–24 October 2019 in Sochi, Russia, co-hosted by Russian president Vladimir Putin and Egyptian president Abdel Fattah el-Sisi. 43 heads of state or government were in attendance.

Putin emphasized "state sovereignty" and Russian willingness to offer aid or trade deals "without political or other conditions", said that "an array of Western countries are resorting to pressure, intimidation and blackmail of sovereign African governments," against which Russia was well suited to help African states push back.

The second Russia-Africa Summit was scheduled for October 2022 in Addis Ababa, but was then rescheduled to 26–29 July 2023 in Saint Petersburg.

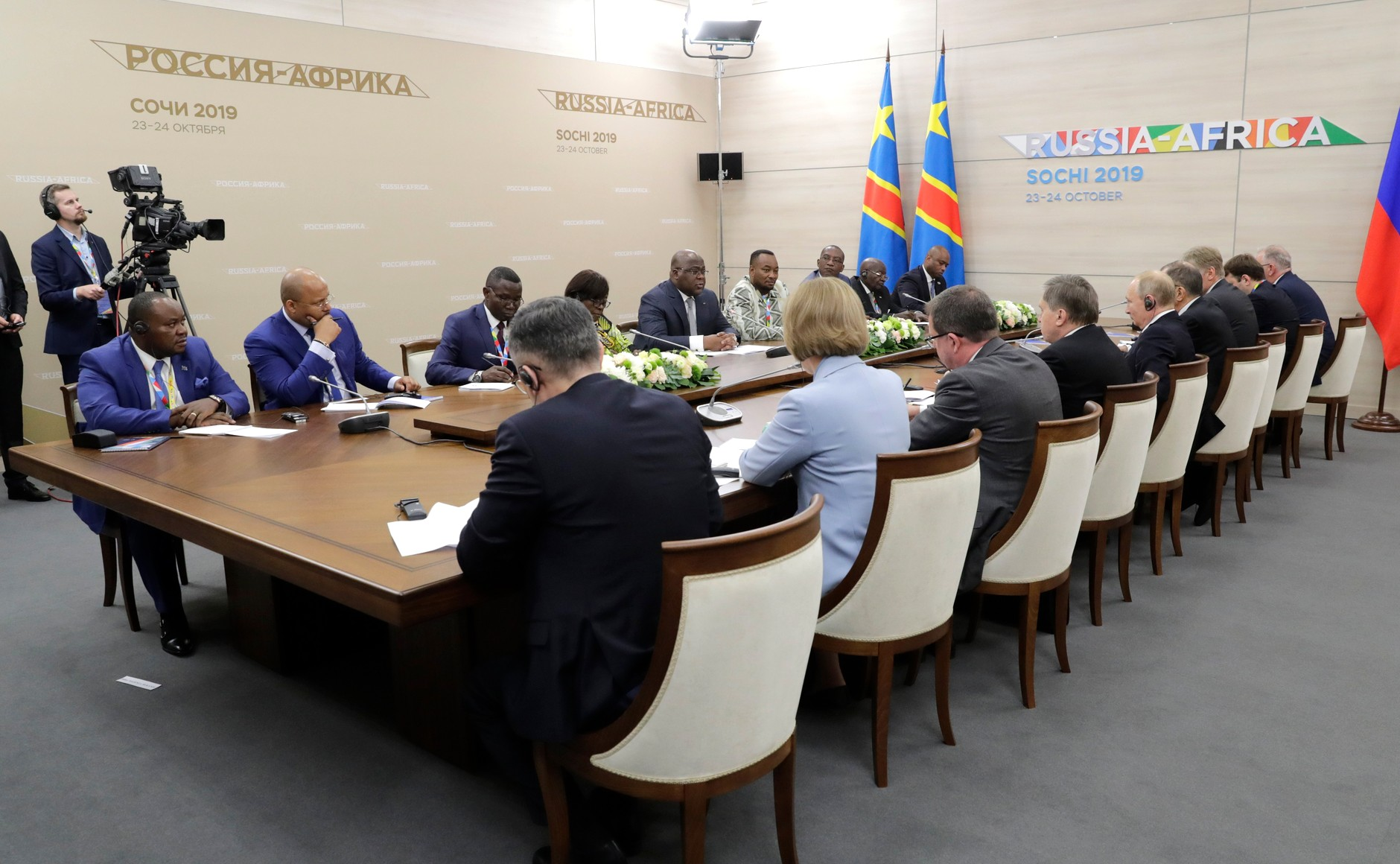
Vladimir Putin and the Russian delegation meeting with Félix Tshisekedi and the Congolese delegation

== Attendees ==
=== Hosts ===
- Vladimir Putin, President of Russia
- Abdel Fattah el-Sisi, President of Egypt

=== Other attendees ===
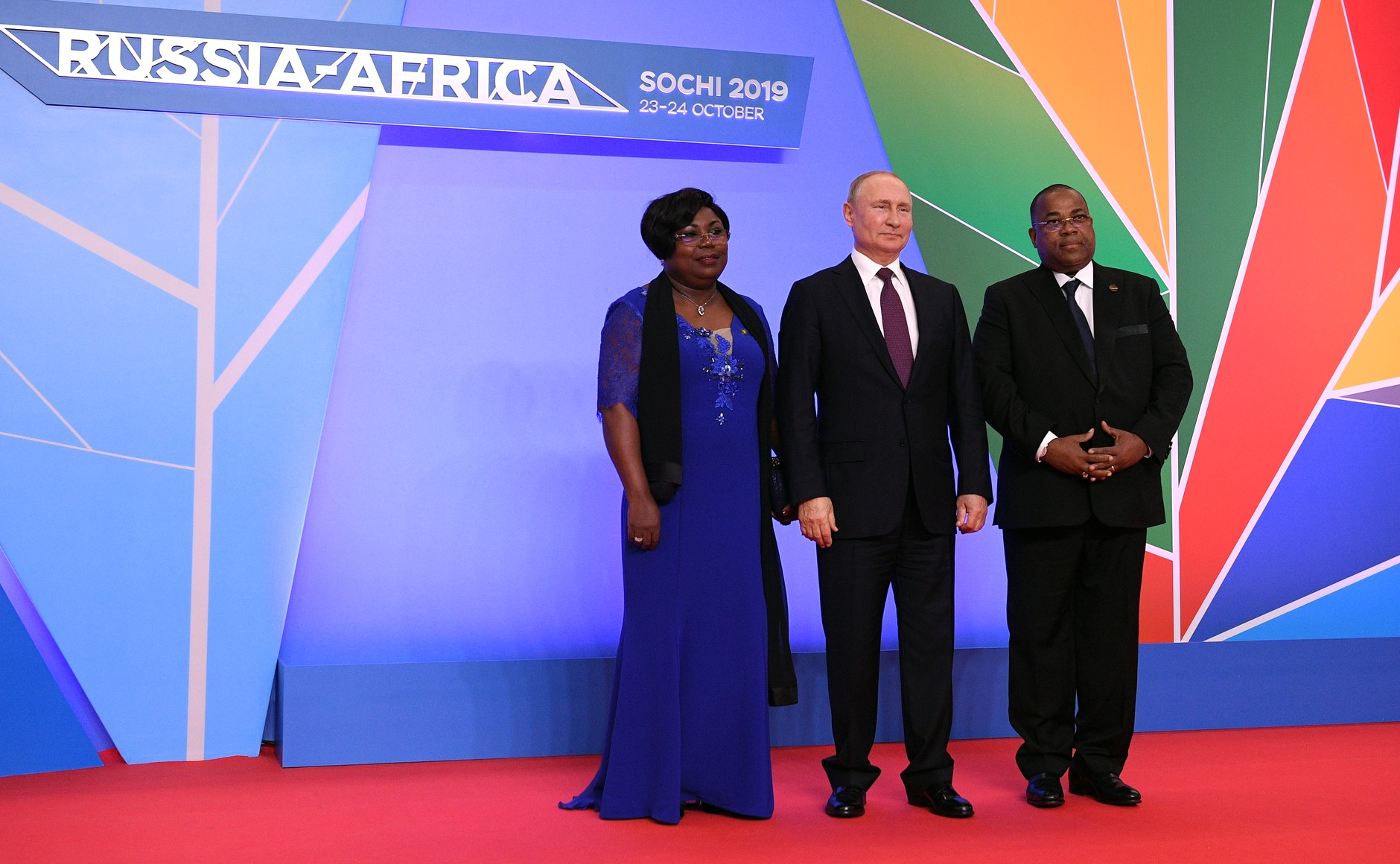
Vladimir Putin and Prime Minister of Gabon Julien Nkoghe Bekale

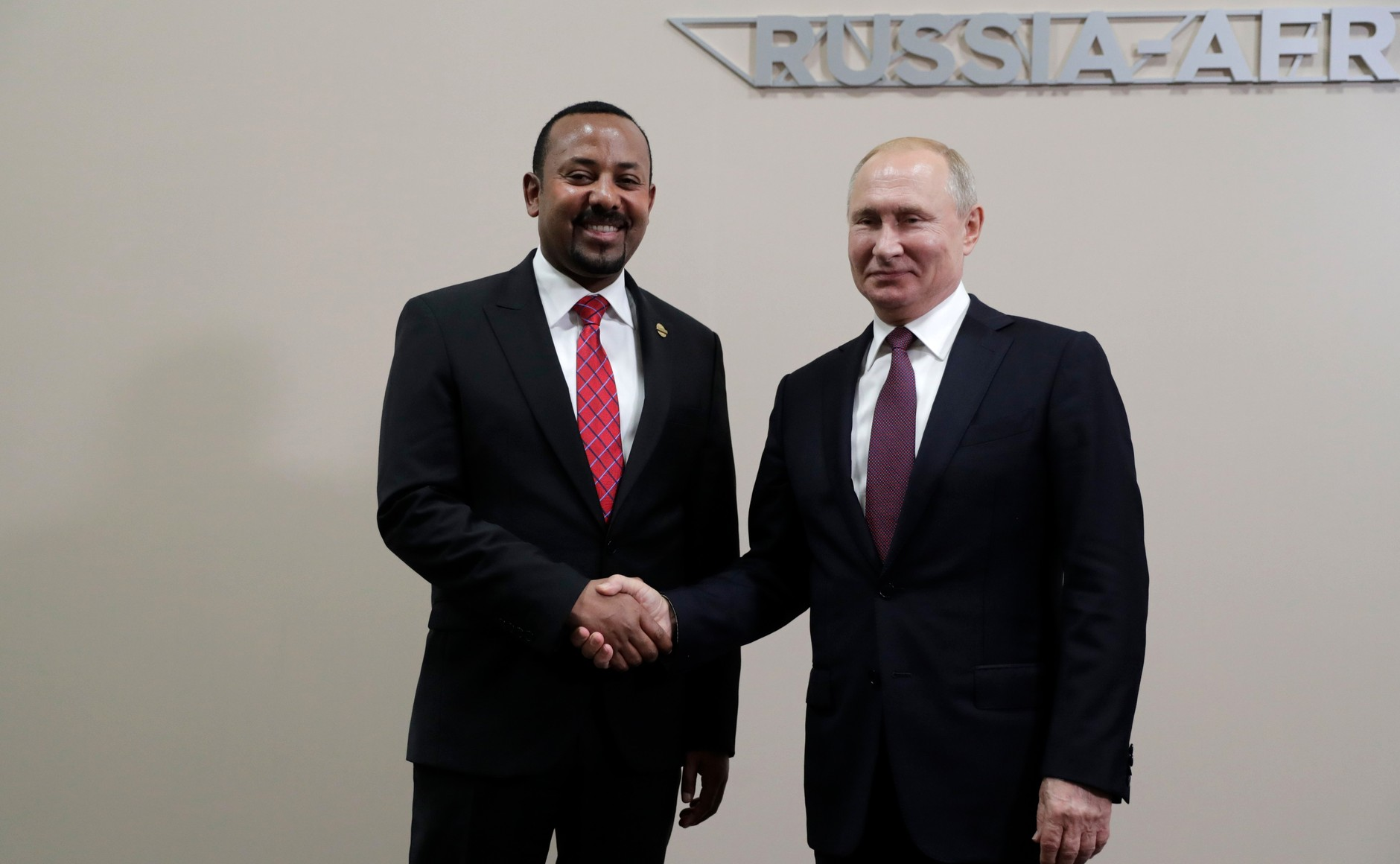
Vladimir Putin and Ethiopian prime minister Abiy Ahmed

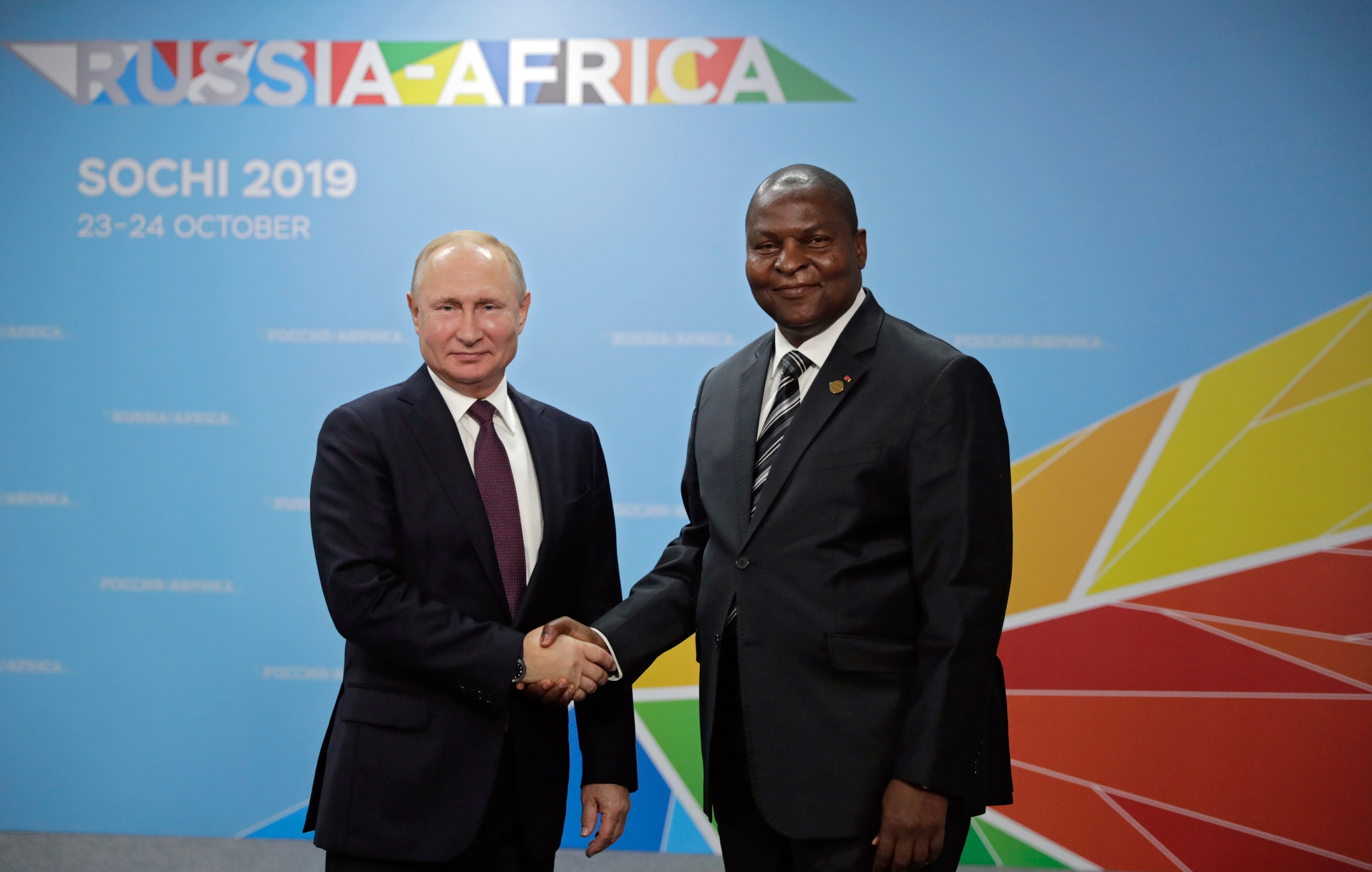
Vladimir Putin and Central African Republic's president Faustin-Archange Touadéra

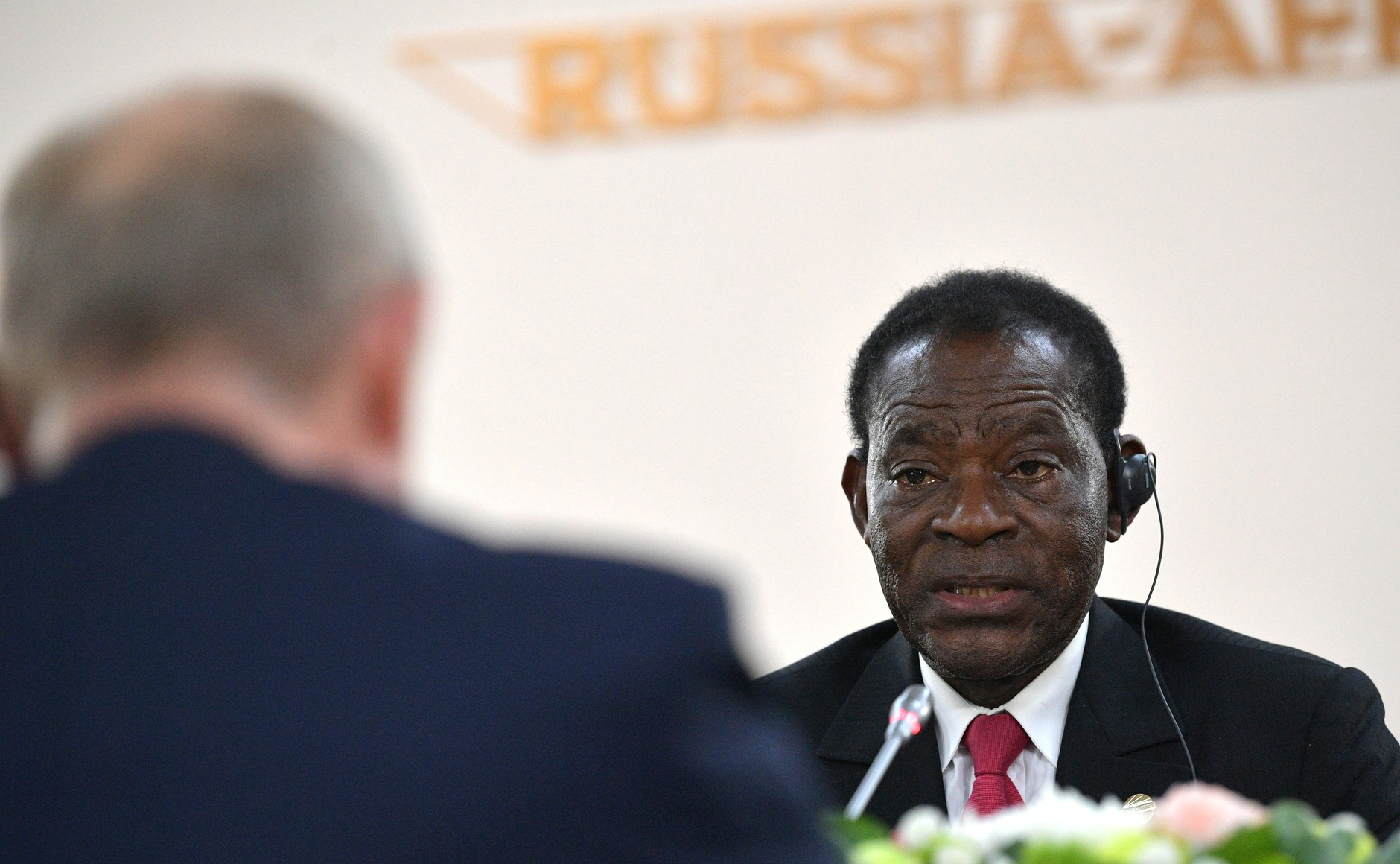
Vladimir Putin and President of Equatorial Guinea, Teodoro Obiang Nguema Mbasogo

- Abdelkader Bensaleh, Acting President of Algeria
- João Lourenço, President of Angola
- Patrice Talon, President of Benin
- Roch Marc Christian Kaboré, President of Burkina Faso
- Faustin-Archange Touadéra, President of the Central African Republic
- Idriss Déby, President of Chad
- Azali Assoumani, President of the Comoros
- Felix Tshisekedi, President of the Democratic Republic of the Congo
- Denis Sassou Nguesso, President of the Republic of the Congo
- Ismail Omar Guelleh, President of Djibouti
- Osman Saleh, Minister of Foreign Affairs of Eritrea
- Mswati III, King of Eswatini
- Abiy Ahmed, Prime Minister of Ethiopia
- Julien Nkoghe Bekale, Prime Minister of Gabon
- Adama Barrow, President of The Gambia
- Nana Addo Dankwa Akufo-Addo, President of Ghana
- Teodoro Obiang Nguema Mbasogo, President of Equatorial Guinea
- Alpha Conde, President of Guinea
- Uhuru Kenyatta, President of Kenya
- Jewel Howard Taylor, Vice President of Liberia
- Fayez al-Sarraj, Chairman of the Presidential Council of Libya
- Andry Rajoelina, President of Madagascar
- Ibrahim Boubacar Keita, President of Mali
- Peter Mutharika, President of Malawi
- Mohamed Ould Ghazouani, President of Mauritania
- Filipe Nyusi, President of Mozambique
- Hage Geingob, President of Namibia
- Muhammadu Buhari, President of Nigeria
- Paul Kagame, President of Rwanda
- Danny Faure, President of Seychelles
- Julius Maada Bio, President of Sierra Leone
- Mohamed Abdulahi Farmaajo, President of Somalia
- Cyril Ramaphosa, President of South Africa
- Salva Kiir, President of South Sudan
- Abdul Fattah al-Burhan, President of the Sovereignty Council of Sudan
- Kassim Majaliwa, Prime Minister of Tanzania
- Faure Gnassingbe, President of Togo
- Youssef Chahed, Prime Minister of Tunisia
- Yoweri Museveni, President of Uganda
- Emmerson Mnangagwa, President of Zimbabwe

== See also ==
- Speech by Nathalie Yamb in Sochi

== External sources ==
- The Russia-Africa Summit and Economic Forum
