= Ministry of Justice (Gabon) =

Government ministry of Gabon

The Ministry of Justice of Gabon is responsible for the following duties:

- Ensuring the application of any laws and regulations in accordance with the texts in force
- Ensuring the proper functioning of the jurisdictions under the ministry’s control (e.g., expenses)
- Overseeing the operations of the Judicial Police

== List of ministers (Mainly post-1960 upon achieving independence) ==
- Vincent de Paul Nyonda (1963-1964)
- Paul Marie Yembit (1964-1966)
- Augustin Boumah (1967)
- Samuel Minko (1968)
- Eugene Amogho (1968)
- Jérôme Okinda (1969)
- Andre Mintsa (1970)
- Léon Mébiame (1970-1971)
- Jean Rémy Ayouné (1971-1972)
- Valentin Obame (1972-1974)
- Jacques Igoho (1974-1976)
- Raphaël Mamiaka (1976-1978)
- Jules-Aristide Bourdes-Ogouliguende (1978-1980)
- Théodore Kwaou (1980-1981)
- Edouard-Alexis Mbouy-Boutzit (1981-1983)
- Georges Nkoma (1983-1986)
- Sophie Diouly (née Ngwamassana) (1987-1989) [1st woman]
- Sylvestre Oyonomi (1989-1990)
- Michel Anchouey (1991)
- Serge Mba-Bekale (1991-1994)
- Pierre-Louis Okawé (1994-2000)
- Pascal Desire Missongo (2001-2002)
- Honorine Dossou Naki (2002-2008)
- Martin Mabala (2008-2009)
- Anicette Nanga Oviga (2009-2011)
- Ida Reteno Assonouet (2011-2014)
- Séraphin Moundounga (2014-August 2016)
- Alexis Boutamba (August - September 2016)
- Denise Mekamme (September 2016-August 2017)
- Francis Nkéa Ndzigue (August 2017 - February 2018)
- Edgard Anicet Mboumbou Miyakou (February 2018-December 2019)
- Erlyne Antonella Ndembet (December 2019-2023)
- Paul-Marie Gondjout (2023-Incumbent)

== See also ==
- Justice ministry
- Politics of Gabon
