= Ida Reteno Assonouet =

Gabonese politician

Ida Reteno Assonouet is a Gabonese politician.

She was born on 23 June 1957 in Pointe-Noire. She was the Minister of Justice for Gabon from January 2011 to January 2014. In January 2014, she was appointed as Minister of Culture, Arts, and Civic Education. Since 3 October 2014, she has been the Minister of National Education and Technical and Vocational Training.
