= Joseph Tonda =

Joseph Tonda (born 1952) is a sociologist and anthropologist of Congolese and Gabonese background. He is a specialist of Congolese and Gabonese culture, society, and politics, and is currently professor of sociology at Omar Bongo University in Libreville. He is also a regular visiting instructor at the École des Hautes Études en Sciences Sociales (EHESS) in Paris, France.

Tonda received his doctorate at the University of Grenoble in France and his habilitation in 2003 at the EHESS. He is the author of Le souverain moderne (The Modern Sovereign), an analysis of the modern state in central equatorial Africa, its corporeal structure as an all-encompassing and "composite" power, whose sexualized imagery lies at the heart of its violent nature after independence.

Tonda's areas of specialization include the anthropology of religion, of medicine, and of the cults of the body in modern central Africa. He has also written on the relationship between violence, power, and the imaginary in central Africa. He is one of the founding members of the Association, Rupture-Solidarité, a network of Congolese dissident intellectuals.

He is also the author of two unpublished novels:

- Myrtille
- Les chiens de foudre (Thunder Dogs)

== Publications ==
- Le souverain moderne: le corps du pouvoir en Afrique centrale, Congo et Gabon. Paris: Karthala, collection "Hommes et Sociétés", 2005.
- La guérison divine en Afrique centrale. Paris: Karthala, 2002.
- Les églises et la société congolaise aujourd'hui, économie religieuse de la misère en société postcoloniale, eds. Joseph Tonda and Jean-Pierre Missie, L'Harmattan, collection "Etudes africaines", 2007.
- L'impérialisme postcolonial, critique de la société des éblouissements. Paris: Karthala, collection "Les Afriques", 2015.

-Articles-

- "Pentecôtisme et 'contentieux matériel' transnational en Afrique centrale. La magie du système capitaliste," in Social Compass 58:1 (2011) 42–60.
- “Le Mausolée Brazza, corps mystique de l'´Etat congolais ou corps du 'négatif'” in Cahiers d'études africaines 198–199–200. 2010.
- “Omar Bongo Ondimba, Paradigme du Pouvoir Postcolonial,” in Politique africaine no. 114, juin 2009.
- ″La violence de l'imaginaire des enfants-sorciers,″ in Cahiers d'études africaines 189–190.2008.
- “Entre communautarisme et individualisme: la 'tuée tuée', une figure-miroir de la déparentélisation au Gabon,” in Sociologie et sociétés, 39:2 (2007): 79–99.
- “Des affaires du corps aux affaires politiques: le champ de la guérison divine au Congo,” in Social Compass 48:403, 2001.
- “Le syndrome du prophète, Médecines africaines et précarités identitaires,” in Cahiers d'études africaines 161. 2001.
- “Enjeux du deuil et négociation des rapports sociaux de sexe au Congo,” in Cahiers d'études africaines 157. 2000.
