= Joseph Owondault Berre =

Gabonese politician (born 1945)

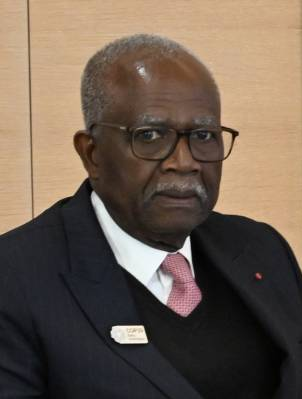
- Berre in 2024

7th Vice President of Gabon
- In office 11 September 2023 – 5 May 2025
- President: Brice Oligui Nguema
- Preceded by: Rose Christiane Raponda
- Succeeded by: Séraphin Moundounga

Personal details
- Born: 21 October 1945 (age 80) Mouila, French Equatorial Africa
- Education: Institut national des sciences appliquées de Lyon

Joseph Owondault Berre (born 21 October 1945) is a Gabonese engineer and former vice president of Gabon under Brice Oligui Nguema. He served as vice president in a transitional capacity between September 2023 and May 2025.

Berre was born on 21 October 1945 in Mouila. He has an engineering degree from the Institut national des sciences appliquées (INSA) acquired in 1972.

Berre worked as an engineer by profession, and worked in Gabon Energy and Water Company (SEEG) and as a general manager in the Petroleum Products Warehousing Company (SGEPP). He was an advisor to the mayor of Libreville from 1985 to 1988. He retired in 2003 and worked as an independent consultant for oil businesses.

Preceded by Rose Christiane Raponda	Vice President of Gabon; 2023 – 2025	Succeeded by Séraphin Moundounga
