= Paul-Marie Yembit =

1st Vice-President of Gabon

1st Vice-President of Gabon
- In office 12 February 1961 – 12 November 1966
- President: Léon M'ba
- Preceded by: Position created
- Succeeded by: Omar Bongo

Personal details
- Born: Paul-Marie Yembit; 22 December 1917 Moussambou, French Equatorial Africa (now Moussambo, Ngounié Province, Gabon)
- Died: 21 January 1978 (aged 60) Libreville, Gabon
- Party: Democratic Party

Paul-Marie Yembit (22 December 1917 – 21 January 1978) was the first vice president of Gabon under Léon M'ba.

A member of the Bapounou people, he was born in the village of Moussambou and educated in local Catholic schools, then at the public secondary school of Lambaréné. He was a businessman in Mouila from 1943 to 1952, then was elected to the Territorial Assembly, representing Ngounié Province. In March 1957, he was re-elected to the Legislative Assembly. A member of the Gabonese Democratic Bloc, he also became Minister of Agriculture and Livestock in March 1957, later holding ministerial posts until becoming vice president in February 1961. He also held the portfolio of Minister of Justice. M'ba replaced Yembit with Omar Bongo in November 1966, and had elections held the following year to confirm Bongo's position.

Yembit died in Libreville on 21 January 1978, aged 60.

== Notes ==
Preceded by Position created	Vice President of Gabon; 1961-1966	Succeeded by Omar Bongo
