= Brice Oligui Nguema =

President of Gabon since 2023

His Excellency Brigadier General Brice Oligui Nguema
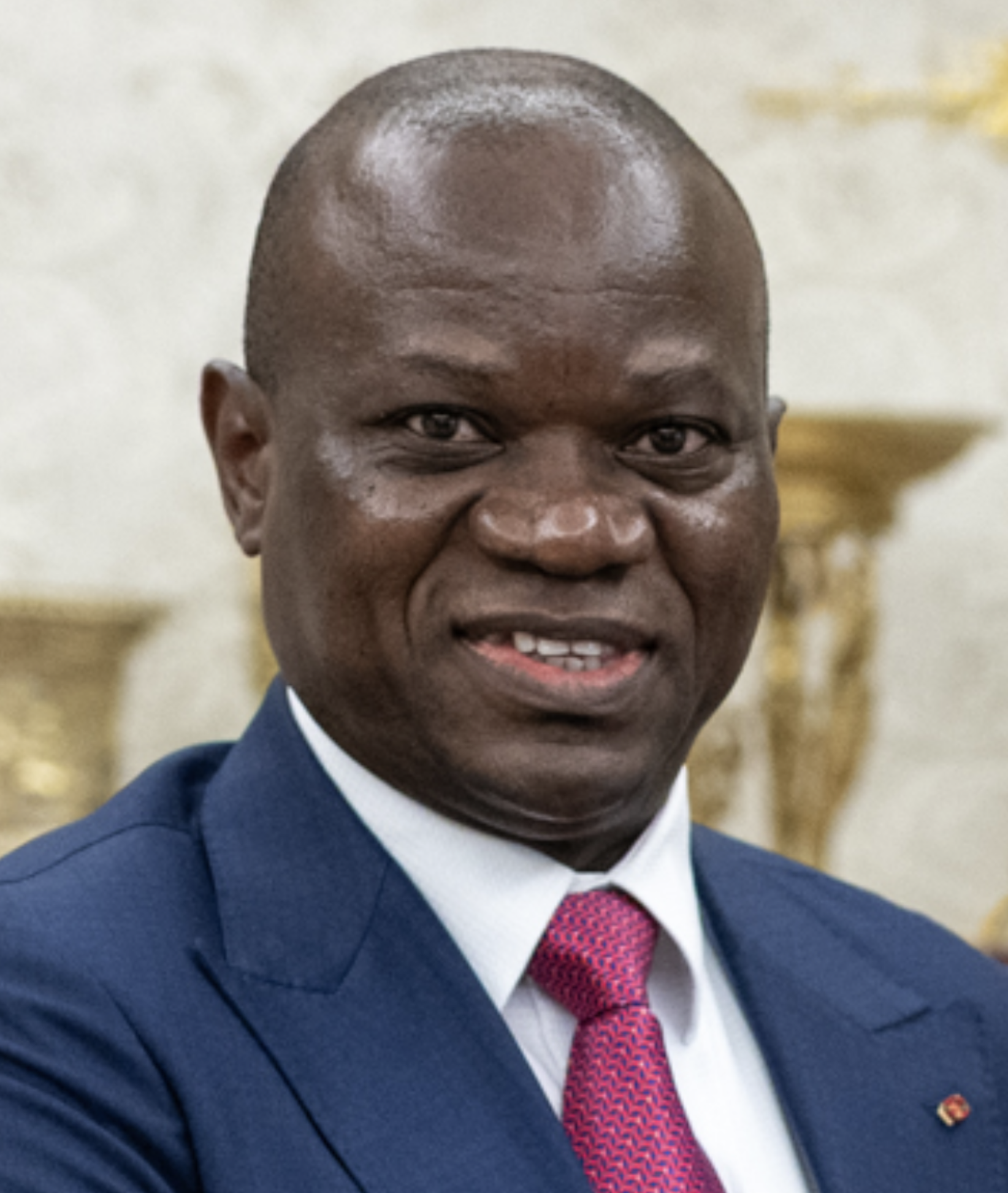
- Oligui in 2025

4th President of Gabon
- Incumbent
- Assumed office 3 May 2025 (Note: Transitional period: per CTRI from 30 August 2023 until 4 September; per oath from 4 September 2023 until 3 May 2025)
- Prime Minister: Raymond Ndong Sima (2023–2025); Office abolished (2025–present)
- Vice President: Joseph Owondault Berre (2023–2025); Séraphin Moundounga (2025–2026); Alexandre Barro Chambrier (2026-present)
- Leader: Himself as Chairman of the Committee for the Transition and Restoration of Institutions (2023–2025); None office abolished (2025–present)
- Preceded by: Ali Bongo

Chairman (Note: Or President) of the Committee for the Transition and Restoration of Institutions
- In office 30 August 2023 – 2 May 2025
- President: Himself (transitional)
- Prime Minister: Raymond Ndong Sima
- Preceded by: Collective leadership of the Committee for the Transition and Restoration of Institutions
- Succeeded by: Position abolished

Commander-in-Chief of the Gabonese Republican Guard
- Incumbent
- Assumed office 3 March 2020 (Note: With Grégoire Kouna until 8 April 2020, but not afterwards. Alongside Antoine Balekidra (acting) since 18 September 2023.)
- Deputy: Antoine Balekidra
- Preceded by: Grégoire Kouna

Minister of Defense and Security
- In office 4 September 2023 – 10 February 2024
- Prime Minister: Raymond Ndong Sima
- Succeeded by: Brigitte Onkanowa (Defense); Hermann Immongault (Security)

Chief of the Secret Service of the Gabonese Republican Guard and Director-General of the Special Service
- In office 16 October 2019 – 8 April 2020
- Preceded by: Colonel Frédéric Bongo
- Succeeded by: Unknown

Personal details
- Born: Brice Clotaire Oligui Nguema; 3 March 1975 (age 51) Ngouoni, Haut-Ogooué Province, Gabon
- Party: Democratic Union of Builders (since 2025)
- Other political affiliations: Independent (until 2025)
- Spouse: Zita Nyangue Oligui
- Education: Omar Bongo University; Meknes Royal Military Academy
- Website: Official website

Military service
- Allegiance: Gabon
- Branch/service: Gabonese Army
- Years of service: 1990–present
- Rank: Brigadier general

Brice Clotaire Oligui Nguema (French pronunciation: [bʁis klɔ.tɛʁ ɔ.li.gi ŋgɛ.ma]; born 3 March 1975) is a Gabonese politician and military officer who is currently serving as the fourth president of Gabon since May 2025, having previously served in this role in a transitional capacity from 2023 and was also the chairman of the Committee for the Transition and Restoration of Institutions from 2023 until his accession to the presidency. He has also been the commander-in-chief of the Gabonese Republican Guard since 2020.

Oligui is a member of the Bongo family and played a key part in overthrowing his cousin Ali Bongo during the 2023 coup. He ran for president in Gabon's first democratic election in five decades and was elected.

== Early life ==
The son of a Teke mother and Fang military officer, Oligui was born in Haut-Ogooué Province, Gabon, which was regarded as a stronghold of the ruling Bongo family. He is a maternal cousin of Ali Bongo, his predecessor as president. Oligui was mostly raised by his mother and her family in Haut-Ogooué, and studied at Omar Bongo University.

== Career ==
Oligui studied at Meknes Royal Military Academy in Morocco. He served as an aide-de-camp to President Omar Bongo until his death in 2009. He then served as a military attaché at the Gabonese embassies in Morocco and Senegal.

In October 2018, he was recalled to Gabon where he replaced President Ali Bongo's half-brother Colonel Frédéric Bongo at the head of the intelligence service of the Republican Guard. He was then promoted to brigadier general in April 2019. In 2021 he restarted Operation Mamba, a campaign to arrest corrupt officials.

He took over as head of the Gabonese Republican Guard in April 2020, replacing General Grégoire Kouna, a cousin of then President Ali Bongo. He significantly increased the Special Interventions Section (SIS), a special unit placed under the direct authority of the President, increasing it from around thirty to more than 300 elements. He also composed a song which included the line "I would defend my president with honour and loyalty".

According to a 2020 Organized Crime and Corruption Reporting Project (OCCRP) investigation, he owns several properties in the United States worth more than $1 million and also helped expand the Bongos' overseas businesses. Asked about these dealings, he said they were a "private affair".

Officials of Bongo's regime and others who had interacted with Oligui described him as a "fairly intelligent man, easy to talk to", "discreet" and "a man of consensus" who is "very appreciated by his men".

== Coup and presidency (2023–present) ==
On 30 August 2023, Nguema and his Republican Guards took power without encountering any resistance during a coup d'état. This occurred just hours after the electoral authorities announced in the middle of the night that the incumbent president, Ali Bongo, had won a third seven-year term with a significant 64% of the vote in the 2023 Gabonese presidential election a few days prior. Following the coup, the Committee for the Transition and Restoration of Institutions named Oligui as the interim president of Gabon in an announcement aired on state television. He was later seen on the shoulders of jubilant army personnel calling him the "President".

In an interview with Le Monde later in the day, he referred to Bongo as "retired", and said that the military had staged the coup due to discontent that had been growing in the country since Bongo's stroke in 2018, his decision to run for a third term, the disregarding of the country's constitution and the conduct of the election. His appointment as interim president was later confirmed by other generals, and he was formally sworn in as "transitional president" at the Presidential Palace on 4 September. In his inaugural address, he pledged to hold "free, transparent" elections but did not give an exact date as to when. He also announced the formation of a new government in the coming days and proposed new electoral legislation, a new penal code, a referendum on a new constitution, and the release of all political prisoners.

In October 2023, Nguema announced that he would give up his salary as president and rely instead on his wages as commander of the Republican Guard. In March 2025, Nguema announced that he would run for president in his own right in the 2025 Gabonese presidential election on 12 April. In the lead-up to the election, Nguema created his political platform, Rally of Builders. He was elected with nearly 95% of the votes and was inaugurated on 3 May.

On 5 July 2025, Nguema formally established a new political party, the Democratic Union of Builders (UDB), succeeding the RDB platform. In the 2025 Gabonese parliamentary election the UDB won 44% of the vote in the first round and 101 of the 140 seats in the National Assembly, establishing majority control of the legislature in support of his administration. The former-ruling Gabonese Democratic Party became the main opposition with 17 seats.

On 12 August 2025, Nguema's government issued an amnesty for participants in the 2023 coup and the 2019 Gabonese coup attempt as part of promises he made during his election campaign.

=== Economy policy ===
Nguema has advocated for a free market economy system. All major political actors accept the market economy as an enduring feature of their economic system. There has been no change in this ideological consensus since the August 2023 coup. Nguema has helped Gabon transition to a democratic governance system for the first time in five decades.

=== International relations ===
Nguema has sought to maintain and broaden ties with Western partners, including its former colonial power, France. Of the five West and Central African nations that have endured coups since 2020, Nguema's Gabon is the only one to return to imminent civilian rule or maintain close relations with their former colonial power. Emmanuel Macron made a state visit to Libreville on 23–24 November 2025. Nguema announced a state visit to Paris in return for July 2026.

Nguema has also moved to deepen relations with the United States. In February 2026 a U.S. State Department delegation reaffirmed Gabon's status as a strategic partner in the Congo Basin.

Relations with the United Arab Emirates have expanded rapidly. Non-oil trade between the two countries reached US$320.7 million in 2025, more than double the level recorded in 2021. In February 2026 the UAE and Gabon signed a Comprehensive Economic Partnership Agreement in Abu Dhabi. Subsequent to that, in June 2026, the two agreed to deepen its cooperation on transport and logistic infrastructure. The headline project is the deep-water port at Mayumba developed with KEZAD Group, a subsidiary of Abu Dhabi Ports Group, which Gabonese authorities describe as a strategic priority for increasing export capacity and positioning the country as a regional logistics hub.

== Personal life ==
Nguema is married to Zita Nyangue Oligui. Nguema is a Christian. His brother-in-law Régis Onanga Ndiaye is his Minister for Foreign Affairs.

== See also ==
- List of current heads of state and government
- List of heads of the executive by approval rating

== Notes ==
Political offices
Preceded by Ali Bongo	President of Gabon; 2023–present	Incumbent
