= Anifa Mvuemba =

Kenyan-born American fashion designer

- Born: 1990 or 1991 (age 34–35); Nairobi, Kenya
- Occupation: Fashion designer
- Years active: 2011–present
- Known for: Founder of Hanifa
- Website: hanifa.co

Anifa Mvuemba (born 1990 or 1991) is a Kenyan-born American fashion designer of Congolese descent best known as the founder of womenswear brand Hanifa. In 2020, her all-digital "Pink Label Congo" show, streamed on Instagram Live with headless 3D models in place of humans, went viral during the COVID-19 pandemic. In 2021, she was an awardee of the CFDA/Vogue Fashion Fund and received InStyle's Future of Fashion Award.

== Early life ==
Anifa Mvuemba was born in Nairobi, Kenya to parents of Congolese origin and immigrated with her family to the United States at age three, in 1993. She is one of seven children. Mvuemba was first exposed to fashion by watching her mother get dressed every morning. In 2005, her brother was murdered in Maryland. After her brother's death, the family spent time in Dubai at the invitation of a family friend, a stay she has said shifted her perspective. She attended Gaithersburg High School and then Morgan State University, where she studied fashion merchandising. She later dropped out of college and quit her retail job at Nordstrom, citing a rough transition to adulthood as the cause.

== Career ==
Mvuemba began designing garments after taking a fashion design course while in her junior year of high school. She began creating dresses for friends and other clients in 2011, at the age of 21, after posting a picture of a dress she made out of fabric scraps to Instagram. Mvuemba then taught herself the technical knowledge of sewing by watching YouTube videos and examining her aunt, a seamstress, while working. She launched her own fashion brand, Hanifa, in 2012. She has said that she stepped away from the brand in 2015, and that she sewed every order herself until March 2018. Her big break came in 2017, when Ciara posted a photo of herself wearing red Hanifa pants. In January 2019, she opened a storefront in her Maryland hometown, and that September she took part in Teen Vogue's Generation Next presentation in New York.

On May 22, 2020, during the COVID-19 pandemic, she presented her "Pink Label Congo" collection in a digital fashion show streamed on Instagram Live, with the clothes modeled by headless 3D figures instead of humans; the show went viral, and the accompanying film paid tribute to her Congolese heritage while touching on the illegal trade of coltan mined in the country. On November 16, 2021, her birthday, Hanifa held its first in-person runway show, "Hanifa Dream", at the National Portrait Gallery in Washington, D.C.; the 35-look show marked the brand's tenth anniversary and introduced a footwear line produced in-house. Mvuemba financed the show with the $50,000 grant she received as a 2021 CFDA/Vogue Fashion Fund awardee, a year in which all ten finalists received funding. She also received InStyle's Future of Fashion Award that year.

In June 2022, the brand presented its 28-piece spring/summer collection, "Live Out Loud", in a digital show streamed on YouTube. In August 2022, Mvuemba called out fast fashion brand Fashion Nova for copying the design of her Jax Knit Gown, and Fashion Nova removed its version from its website. In December 2022, two of her designs were included in "Those Who Dress Better", a fashion exhibit curated by Black Fashion Fair and the estate of Jean-Michel Basquiat. In 2023, Hanifa debuted its first bridal collection in Middleburg, Virginia.

Mvuemba's garments have been worn by celebrities such as Beyoncé, Gabrielle Union, Ashley Graham, Sarah Jessica Parker, Tracee Ellis Ross, Issa Rae, Michelle Obama, Zendaya, Iman, Cardi B, Bella Hadid, Lizzo, Padma Lakshmi, Fantasia, Kylie Jenner, and Ciara. She also designed Savannah James' look for the 2025 Met Gala.

In January 2025, the brand marked its 100,000th order. That November, Hanifa's annual "Hanifa Friday" sale drew a surge of pre-orders, and production delays from the brand's manufacturers left many customers waiting weeks past the expected shipping window. As complaints spread on social media, Mvuemba apologized for the delays in a January 2026 video posted while on maternity leave, and said all sale orders had since been fulfilled. On March 2, 2026, the brand announced it was pausing production indefinitely: the website would remain live and fulfillment would continue, but nothing would be restocked. In a statement to The Cut, Mvuemba wrote that she did not want to "rush just to prove resilience" and did not know what the future of the brand would look like.

== Personal life ==
She has two children: a daughter born in 2023, and a second child born in December 2025.
