= Gladys Ejomi =

Cameroonian physician (died 2020)

- Born: Limbe, Cameroon
- Died: 16 July 2020; Douala
- Occupation: Physician
- Children: 1

Gladys Ejomi (died 16 July 2020) was the first female Cameroonian certificated physician.

Ejomi was born in Limbe, Cameroon. She was in Ibadan, in London, and in the United States at Harvard in 1971. She obtained her medical degree in 1962. She was educated in Buéa and Bamenda. She acted as a consultant for the African University Foundation Board of Trustees and organized conferences to promote the activities and accomplishments of women in the country.

She was an executive at the CUSS in Yaoundé.She received the Minister's Award of Excellence.She has a son who is a doctor. Ejomi died in the Douala General Hospital on 16 July 2020. An award was created in remembrance of her life by the Cameroon Medical Women Association (CMWA) and is to be given to female physicians who excel in the field.
