= Orchestra Super Mazembe =

Kenyan soukous band

Orchestra Super Mazembe was a Kenyan Congolese rumba band. Originally formed in Zaire in 1967 under the name Super Vox, the group, led by Longwa Didos Mutonkole, moved to Nairobi in 1974 and changed their name. Their biggest hit was "Shauri Yako", a cover version of a song first performed by Nguashi Ntimbo and Festival Du Zaire. In 2006, they renamed themselves Orchestra Bana Mazembe, after most of the original members had died.

== Selected band members ==
Original lineup

- Longwa Didos Mutonkole – vocals
- Kasongo wa Kanema – vocals
- Loboko Pasi – guitar
- Madjo Maduly
- Okello Jose

Other members

- Longwa "Disco" Ngoie

== Discography ==
Albums

- Mazembe (1980)
- 10th Anniversary (1981)
- Double Gold (1982)
- Kaivaska (1982)
- Wabe-Aba (1984)

Compilations

- Their Greatest Hits (1986)
- Maloba D' Amor (1990)
- Hits of Mazembe vol. 4
- Giants of East Africa (2001)
