= Donatien Mavoungou =

Gabonese doctor (1947–2020)

- Born: 28 August 1947; Ndendé, French Equatorial Africa
- Died: 4 February 2020 (aged 72); Libreville, Gabon
- Occupation: Doctor

Donatien Mavoungou (28 August 1947 – 4 February 2020) was a Gabonese doctor, most well known for inventing DM28- IMMUNOREX. The product was suspended from production following a report by Science et Avenir, proving it to be a fake drug being trafficked between France and Africa.

== Biography ==
In 2007, the French National Centre for Scientific Research honored Mavoungou for his service in the field of cardiovascular research. He was honored the following year in Nuremberg with Special Gift of Nobel Prize Paul Ehrlich Laboratory for his work starting in 1998 at the Magic Bullets conference on HIV. Other awards include the scholarship prize in Ouagadougou, the GlaxoSmithKline Blue Ribbon Award in Orlando in 2005, and the Senior Medical Fellowship Award presented by the International Society on Hypertension in Blacks.

Mavoungou was invited to Paris on 12 December 2011 to give a presentation on the strengthening process of the anti-HIV immune system at the Institut IDSRSI. However, his career took a turn in 2016 when his prized invention, the medication DM28- IMMUNOREX, was found to be fraudulent.

Mavoungou died on 4 February 2020 at age 72.
