= Victor Fotso =

Cameroonian politician (1926–2020)

- Born: 26 June 1926; Bandjoun, French Cameroon
- Died: 19 March 2020 (aged 93); Paris, France
- Occupations: Businessman and Politician

Victor Fotso (26 June 1926 – 19 March 2020) was a famous Cameroonian businessman. He was the founder of the Fotso Group of companies and his foundation, which carries out charitable works in Cameroon and other Sub-Saharan African countries, particularly in the field of education.

== Biography ==
Fotso started a career in trade in Mbalmayo. Here, he met Pierre Castel, who gifted wine in carboys to Fotso for him to distribute. This started the Brasseries et Glacières Internationales (BGI) supplier-distributor relationship between the two men in France and Cameroon.Victor Fotso Celebre son Amitie avec Pierre Castel (YouTube) (in French). Bandjoun: Simeon Tchameu. 26 March 2013.

Fotso served as the mayor of Bandjoun from 1996 until his death in March 2020. His final reelection was in February 2020. He spent his own money to build Bandjoun's city hall, He was the founder of IUT de Bandjoun, which offered Cameroon its first institute of technology.

== Autobiography ==
- Le Chemin de Hiala (1994)
