= Joseph Bouasse =

Cameroonian footballer (1998–2020)

Personal information
- Full name: Joseph Bouasse Ombiogno Perfection
- Date of birth: 1 September 1998
- Place of birth: Yaoundé, Cameroon
- Date of death: 25 May 2020 (aged 21)
- Place of death: Rome, Italy
- Position: Midfielder

Youth career
- 2016–2017: Roma Primavera

Senior career*
Years	Team	Apps	(Gls)
2017–2018	Roma	0	(0)
2017	→ Vicenza (loan)	1	(0)
2020	Universitatea Cluj	0	(0)
Total		1	(0)
- * Club domestic league appearances and goals

Joseph Bouasse Ombiogno Perfection (1 September 1998 – 25 May 2020) was a Cameroonian footballer.

== Career ==
He made his professional debut in the Serie B for Vicenza on 25 February 2017, in a game against Avellino.

== Death ==
Bouasse died in Rome, Italy on 25 May 2020, from a heart attack, aged 21.
