= Vice President of Gabon =

Deputy head of state of Gabon

Vice President of the Gabonese Republic
- Vice-président de la République gabonaise
- Coat of arms of Gabon

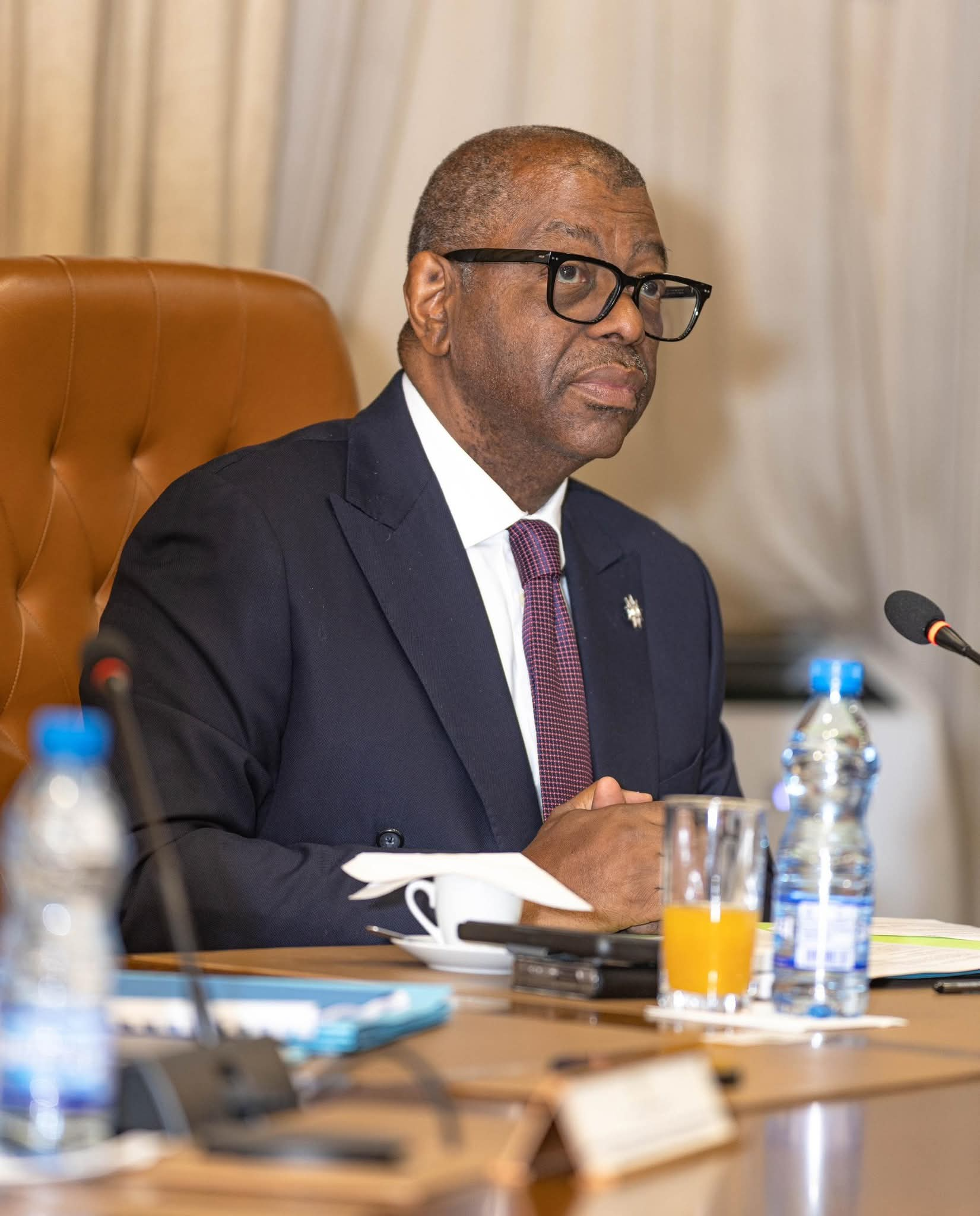
- Incumbent; Alexandre Barro Chambrier since 1 January 2026
- Appointer: President of Gabon
- Formation: February 1961
- First holder: Paul-Marie Yembit

The vice president of Gabon (French: Vice-président du Gabon) is a political position in Gabon. The vice president's role is to assist the president and the person serving as vice president has no interim role in the event of a power vacuum.

The current vice president is Alexandre Barro Chambrier, who was appointed by president Brice Oligui Nguema on 1 January 2026. His predecessor Séraphin Moundounga held the office from 5 May 2025 to 1 January 2026.

== History of the office ==
=== Original office ===
Changes in the Constitution of 1966 made the vice president the automatic successor of the president in case of a vacancy in the latter office. Albert-Bernard Bongo was appointed as vice president in 1966 with the expectation that he would constitutionally succeed the ailing president Leon M'ba, and he did so following M'ba's death in November 1967. In April 1975 the position of vice president was abolished and its functions were given to the prime minister.

=== Restored office ===
The position of vice president was restored in 1997 as a position appointed by the president of Gabon. The vice president acted as the president's deputy, but was not the constitutional successor of the president in the event of a vacancy in the latter office. President Ali Bongo abolished the office in October 2009.

== Description of the office ==
The president of the republic is assisted by a vice president of the republic.

The vice president of the republic is nominated by the president of the republic. The vice president of the republic may be chosen from the members of Parliament, or outside the legislature.

The functions of the vice president of the republic are incompatible with the exercise of all other public and private functions of a lucrative character.

The vice president of the republic takes the oath of office before the president of the republic and in the presence of the Constitutional Court, according to the terms below:

I promise to respect the Constitution and the State of Law, to fill conscientiously the duties of my position in the strictest respect of the obligation of loyalty and confidentiality to the Chief of State.

The vice president of the republic stands in for the president of the republic in the duties that the president delegates to him.

The manner in which the present article may be applied is fixed by an organic law.

The president can terminate the duties of the vice president, after consultation with the presidents of the two chambers of Parliament of Gabon. The functions of the vice president of the republic end at the issuing of the proclamation of the next presidential election results by the Constitutional Court and in the case of a vacancy in the presidential office for whatever reason, or a permanent impairment of the current president of the republic.

The vice president of the republic is a member of the Council of Ministers by right. If appropriate, the vice president may substitute the president of the republic through express authorization and a defined order of business.

== List of officeholders ==
Political parties

Gabonese Democratic Bloc (BDG) → Gabonese Democratic Party (PDG)
Democratic and Republican Alliance (ADERE)
Social Democratic Party (PSD)
Rally for the Fatherland and Modernity (RPM)

Other factions

Independent

Status

Denotes acting or transitional vice president

No.	Portrait	Name (Birth–Death)	Term of office			Political party	President(s)	Ref.
No.	Portrait	Name (Birth–Death)	Took office	Left office	Time in office	Political party	President(s)	Ref.
1		Paul-Marie Yembit (1917–1978)	February 1961	November 1966	5 years, 9 months	BDG	M'ba	
2		Albert-Bernard Bongo (1935–2009)	November 1966	November 1967	1 year	BDG	M'ba	
3		Léon Mébiame (1934–2015)	1968	April 1975	7 years	PDG	O. Bongo	
Post abolished (April 1975–May 1997)
4		Didjob Divungi Di Ndinge (born 1946)	May 1997	October 2009	12 years, 5 months	ADERE	O. Bongo; Himself; Rogombé	
Post abolished (October 2009–August 2017)
5		Pierre Claver Maganga Moussavou (born 1952)	21 August 2017	21 May 2019	1 year, 273 days	PSD	A. Bongo	
6		Rose Christiane Raponda (born 1963)	9 January 2023	30 August 2023 (Deposed in a coup)	233 days	PDG	A. Bongo	
7		Joseph Owondault Berre (born 1945)	11 September 2023	5 May 2025	1 year, 236 days	Independent	Oligui	
8		Séraphin Moundounga (born 1964)	5 May 2025	1 January 2026	241 days	RPM	Oligui	
9		Alexandre Barro Chambrier (born 1958)	1 January 2026	Incumbent	268 days	RPM	Oligui	

== See also ==
- President of Gabon
  - First Lady of Gabon
- Prime Minister of Gabon
- List of colonial governors of Gabon
- Politics of Gabon
