= Omar Bongo University =

University in Gabon

Coordinates: 0.4217°N 9.4456°E

- Université Omar-Bongo
- Former names: Université nationale du Gabon
- Type: Public
- Established: 1970; 56 years ago
- Rector: Mesmin-Noël Soumaho (since 2020)
- Academic staff: ~500
- Students: 34,000 (2021)
- Location: Libreville, Gabon

Omar Bongo University (French: Université Omar Bongo) is a public university which was founded as the National University of Gabon in 1970. It was renamed in honor of President Omar Bongo in 1978. It is based in Libreville, and was the country's first university. It is Gabon's largest university and around 30,000 students are enrolled there (2020).

The university is under the supervision of the Ministry of Higher Education.

== History ==
The Omar Bongo University has been the epicenter of demonstrations and riots since the early 2000s.

In 2010, the university was in an advanced state of deterioration: swamps and weeds had spread all over the campus where reptiles inhabited, and maggots covered the dorms' floors. In 2010, the Minister of Education Séraphin Moundounga launched a project of renovation but the African Development Bank never backed up the initiative, leaving the university in an advanced state of degradation. In 2020, the state of the campus was still deteriorated : old buildings, obsolete computers, and no Wi-Fi network. In February 2020, the dean of the university, Marc-Louis Ropivia, resigned. In August 2020, the university announced some renovation work aiming to clad the external walls of the campus' buildings, a work that had already been done in 2013. The university was designed to host 8,000 students, but 30,000 to 40,000 students are enrolled, which causes a great stress on the infrastructures and the quality of the education. The library only has 200 seatings (2020). In 2019 a large building on campus called the "bunker", which was supposedly a rogue haunt, was demolished. However, the drug dealers moved from the "bunker" to the dorms to pursue their business on campus.

In March 2019, the campus' cafeteria reopened after several months of renovation and with an innovation: the meals can be purchased only with mobile cash. In June 2019, the Portuguese Calouste Gulbenkian Foundation donated 5,000 books to the university.

In April 2021, following the COVID-19 pandemic in Gabon, the university announced that registrations for the next year will be exclusively online.

== See also ==
- Education in Gabon
- Joseph Tonda
- Albert Ondo Ossa
