= Raymond Ndong Sima =

Prime Minister of Gabon (2012–2014, 2023–2025)

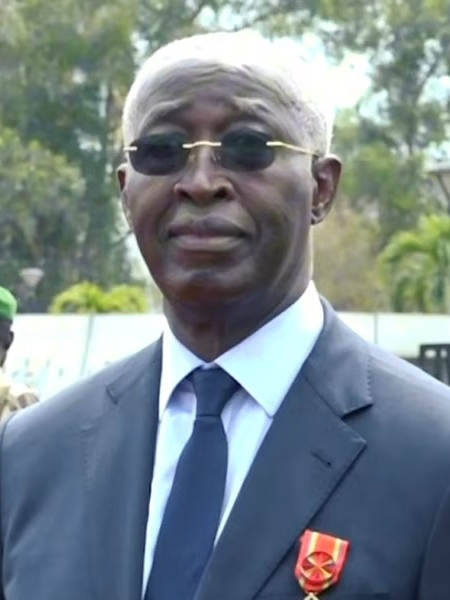
- Ndong Sima in 2024

8th Prime Minister of Gabon
- Acting; 7 September 2023 – 4 May 2025
- President: Brice Oligui Nguema
- Preceded by: Alain Claude Bilie By Nze
- Succeeded by: Office abolished Alexandre Barro Chambrier as Vice President of the Government
- In office 27 February 2012 – 27 January 2014
- President: Ali Bongo Ondimba
- Preceded by: Paul Biyoghé Mba
- Succeeded by: Daniel Ona Ondo

Member of the National Assembly of Gabon
- In office 2012 – 28 April 2018
- Constituency: Kyé, Woleu-Ntem Province

Personal details
- Born: 23 January 1955 (age 71) Oyem, French Equatorial Africa (now Gabon)
- Party: PDG (until 2015)
- Education: Paris 13 University; Paris Dauphine University

Raymond Ndong Sima (born 23 January 1955) is a Gabonese politician who served as transitional Prime Minister of Gabon from September 2023 to May 2025. He was previously prime minister from February 2012 to January 2014.

== Career ==
Ndong Sima was born in Oyem, located in the north of Gabon, and studied in France. He was appointed to the cabinet of the Minister of Planning and the Economy in 1986, where he was assigned responsibility for structural adjustment and relations with the International Monetary Fund and the World Bank. In 1992, he was appointed as Director-General of the Economy; he remained in that post, while simultaneously retaining responsibility for structural adjustment, until 1994. He then worked as Director-General of Hévégab, a state-owned rubber company, from 1994 to 1998.

Ndong Sima was appointed to the government as Minister of Agriculture, Livestock, and Rural Development on 17 October 2009.

In the December 2011 parliamentary election, in which the ruling Gabonese Democratic Party (PDG) won an overwhelming majority of seats, Ndong Sima was elected to the National Assembly as a candidate in Kyé, located in Woleu-Ntem Province.

Prime Minister Paul Biyoghe Mba resigned on 13 February 2012. President Ali Bongo then appointed Ndong Sima as prime minister on 27 February 2012. His appointment was considered noteworthy in that traditionally the post of Prime Minister was given to an ethnic Fang from Estuaire Province, while Ndong Sima was from Woleu-Ntem Province in the north—although he was also a Fang. Prior to his appointment, Ndong Sima had not been considered a particularly important figure on the political scene.

Ndong Sima served as prime minister for nearly two years. Following local elections in December 2013, President Bongo appointed Daniel Ona Ondo to replace Ndong Sima on 24 January 2014. Ona Ondo took office at a handover ceremony with Ndong Sima on 27 January.

In July 2015, Ndong Sima quit the PDG, complaining that the party was not open to criticism and different points of view. He also criticized the government's handling of finances since he left office. PDG Secretary-General Faustin Boukoubi responded that Ndong Sima was an opportunist and insisted that the PDG was internally democratic.

Following his resignation, Ndong Sima ran twice for president against Bongo in 2016 and 2023 but lost, obtaining less than 0.5% of the vote each time. Following the 2023 Gabonese coup d'état, he was reappointed by interim president Brice Oligui Nguema to become prime minister of a transition government on 7 September. The PDG is a member party of his second government. On 4 May 2025, he resigned from office, which marked the end of the transitional government.

Political offices
Preceded by Paul Biyoghé Mba	Prime Minister of Gabon; 2012–2014	Succeeded by Daniel Ona Ondo
Preceded by Alain Claude Bilie By Nze	Prime Minister of Gabon; 2023–2025	Office abolished
