= Laurence Ndong =

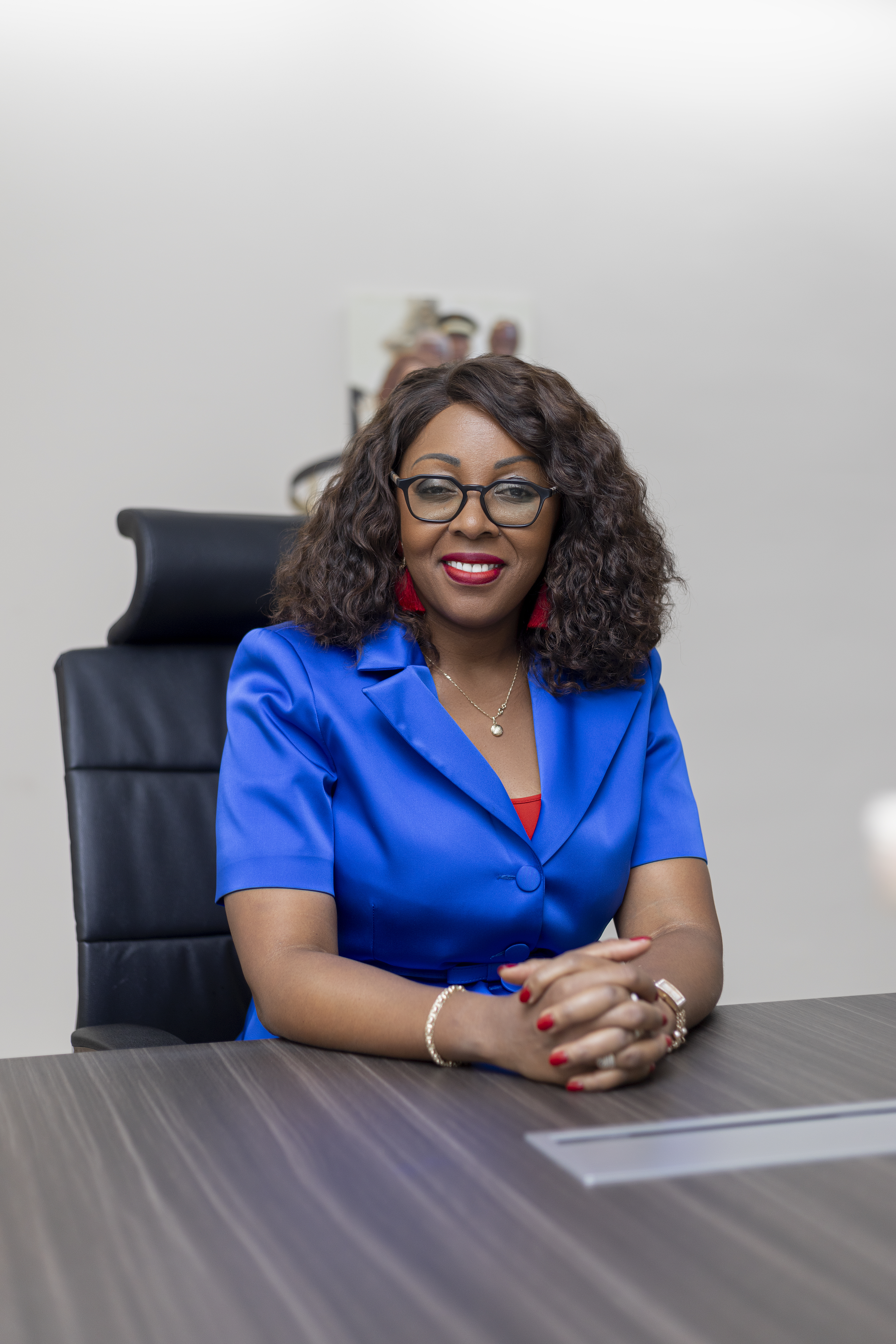
- Laurence Ndong in 2024

Minister of Public Service and Capacity Building
- Incumbent
- Assumed office 5 January 2026
- Succeeded by: François Ndong Obiang

Personal details
- Born: Laurence Mbango; 19 October 1971 (age 54) Douala, Cameroon
- Other political affiliations: Gabonese Democratic Party (until 2015)
- Education: Paris Descartes University

Laurence Ndong (née Mbango; born 19 October 1971) is a Gabonese politician, teacher-researcher and Pentecostal pastor. She serves as a government minister.

A former member of the Gabonese Democratic Party, she left it in 2015 to join the opposition to Ali Bongo. She lived in France for over 20 years before returning to Gabon after the coup d'état of August 2023. A committed activist in the non-profit sector, she notably chaired the association "Debout peuple libre" (Stand Up, Free People) from 2020 onwards, working to defend democracy in Gabon.

In 2023, she became Minister of New Technologies and Communication, as well as spokesperson for the transitional government established by the coup leader Brice Oligui Nguema. On 1 January 2026, she was appointed Minister of Public Service and Capacity Building.

== Biography ==
=== Youth and studies ===
Born Laurence Mbango, she was born on 19 October 1971 in Douala in Cameroon. She was born to a Gabonese father from the Fang people and a Cameroonian mother. After her parents settled in Gabon, she took the name Laurence Mengue-Me-Nzoghe in 1975, when her father officially recognized her.

She studied at the University of Science and Technology of Masuku and at the Higher Normal School of Libreville, then from 1996 became a teacher of Life and Earth Sciences (SVT) in secondary education.

In 2002, she moved to France to join her husband, who was then an executive in a large company. There, in 2008, she obtained a doctorate in didactique des sciences (educational sciences) from Paris Descartes University, where she became a research fellow.

=== Early career ===
Laurence Ndong was close to the Minister of Family and Women's Affairs, Victoire Lasseni Duboze, and in 1999 she was appointed Deputy Director General for Women's Affairs. She also joined the Gabonese Democratic Party (PDG), the ruling party, where she worked as a legislative assistant. She later became Victoire Lasseni Duboze's parliamentary attaché when the latter left the government of Omar Bongo.

When she left Gabon for France in 2002 to join her husband, Laurence Ndong remained involved in the civic and political life of her country. In 2009, during the presidential election following the death of Omar Bongo, she supported the candidacy of opposition leader Bruno Ben Moubamba, joining his campaign team. After the victory of Ali Bongo, she publicly declared her support for the new president.

In 2010, she founded the "Joseph" association to facilitate access to education for young Gabonese people, then the "Widower-Rights-Support and Perspectives" association to help surviving spouses and their children.

Within the PDG, she became, from 2012, the federal delegate of the Women's Union within the French branch of the party.

=== Shift into opposition ===
In 2015, Laurence Ndong left the Gabonese Democratic Party (PDG) and joined the opposition to President Ali Bongo. In her 2016 book, "Gabon, pourquoi j'accuse…" (Gabon, Why I Accuse…), she explained that she "did not recognize herself in the practices of the party members ," believing that "nothing good could come from this party". During the 2016 presidential election, she became the spokesperson for Jean Ping, the opposition candidate. She subsequently denounced the post-election violence. Since then she was a regular commentator in the media, particularly in France, denouncing the actions of Ali Bongo's regime.

In 2020, she became president of "Debout peuple libre", an association whose aim is to defend democracy in Gabon.

During the 2023 Gabonese general election, she was very active on social media, supporting the opposition, disseminating information censored by the Gabonese media and opposing fake news, which made her the target of cyberbullying. She then supported the candidacy of the opposition candidate Albert Ondo Ossa.

=== Entry into the government ===
After the coup d'état of August 2023, which led to the fall of Ali Bongo, Laurence Ndong returned to Gabon. In the days following the coup, she is personally received at the presidential palace by the military officer Brice Oligui Nguema, who has become President of the Transition.

On 10 September 2023, she joined the transitional government, the final addiction the day after its formation. She replaced Ulrich Manfoumbi Manfoumbi as Minister of New Technologies and Communication, and Paul-Marie Gondjout as government spokesperson.

On 17 January 2024, following a cabinet reshuffle, the New Information Technologies portfolio, previously under her purview, was transferred to Bonjean Frédérik Mbaza. She remained in her position as government spokesperson and saw the title of her ministry change to Ministry of Communication and Media.

One year later, on 15 January 2025, in a new reshuffle, she was confirmed in her position as Minister of Communication and Media, but was replaced by Séraphin Akure-Davain as government spokesperson.

On 5 May 2025, she was retained in Brice Clotaire Oligui Nguema's first post-transition government, but moved to a different ministry. Now Minister of the Sea, Fisheries and the Blue Economy, she was also the government spokesperson.

=== Political career ===
==== Minister of Communication and Media ====
One of Laurence Ndong's first actions as minister was to increase the salaries of her lowest-paid staff so that they reached at least the minimum monthly income.

In the days following her appointment, she undertook to assess the state of the various entities under her supervision. In October 2023 she visited the African Institute of Computer Science (IAI) in Libreville. The dilapidated state of the institution, already noted under the previous regime, has not improved despite Ali Bongo's promise to build a new campus. Laurence Ndong made the restoration of this school one of her priorities. In January 2023, although she no longer holds the portfolio of New Information Technologies, she is pledged 400 million FCFA to the school's officials. This sum covered the school staff's salary arrears.

To connect the 30% of the Gabonese population who do not have access to television, radio and/or the internet, Laurence Ndong is launching a network connection project for these underserved areas, mostly located in the interior of the country. The operation, resulting from an Economic Interest Group (EIG) between La Poste SA and Télédiffusion Gabon began in March, notably to allow for widespread dissemination of the inclusive national dialogue that opened on 2 April 2024.

Following the wishes expressed by the transitional president and the allocation of 387 million FCFA by the CTRI, it also undertook the restoration of the pan-African radio station Africa n°1. On 16 March 2024, two months after her first site visit, the Minister of Communication officially launched the cleanup operations at the building located on Boulevard Triomphal. While awaiting the delivery of its new premises, the team broadcast from a mobile studio at the Angondjé stadium in Libreville. On 2 April, on the occasion of the inclusive national dialogue, the "African drum" started broadcasting again on its old frequency 94.5.

==== Government spokesperson ====
After the coup, Laurence Ndong became the spokesperson for the new regime in place. She travelled, notably to Europe where she gave a series of interviews to the media to explain the reasons for this takeover and outline the roadmap of the transitional government.

=== Evangelical Ministry ===
In July 2006, with her husband, she founded the Pentecostal church Centre International pour l'Évangile et la Louange in Antony, in the Hauts-de-Seine in France.

== Personal life ==
At the age of 21, she married Cyrille Ndong, an engineer by training, and took the name Laurence Ndong. They have 5 children together.

== Controversies ==
In January 2024, while she was a member of the government, her husband Cyrille Ndong was appointed Deputy Director General of the Digital Infrastructure Heritage Company (SPIN) by the Council of Ministers. The alleged conflict of interest was then denounced by some in the political sphere and civil society. Télesphore Obame Ngomo, the President's communications advisor, called on the minister to recognize the controversy and draw the necessary conclusions.

== Distinctions ==
- Médaille de reconnaissance de la Garde Républicaine
- Chevalier de l'Ordre national du mérite gabonais
- Chevalier de l'Ordre national de la Libération

== Publications ==
- Gabon, pourquoi j'accuse. Théologie et vie politique de la terre (in French). Paris: L'Harmattan. 2016. p. 181. ISBN 978-2-343-08623-1.
- Femme chrétienne, leadership féminin (in French). Tampere: Atramenta. 2018. p. 152. ISBN 978-952-340-231-7.
- Que les consciences s'éveillent (in French). Paris: Éditions Sydney Laurent. 2022. p. 260. ISBN 979-10-326-7025-5.
