= List of heads of government by higher education =

| Name | Title | University | Location | Degree/Program |
|---|---|---|---|---|
| Hasan Akhund | Prime Minister of Afghanistan | Did not attend | Afghanistan | |
| Edi Rama | Prime Minister of Albania | University of Arts | Albania | |
| Sifi Ghrieb | Prime Minister of Algeria | Badji Mokhtar Annaba University | Algeria | Doctor of Philosophy in Physical Chemistry |
| Xavier Espot Zamora | Prime Minister of Andorra | ESADE University Ramon Llull | Spain | Bachelor of Laws, Master of Laws Humanities |
| João Lourenço | President of Angola | Industrial Institute of Luanda Lenin Military-Political Academy | AngolaUSSR | Master's degree in Historical Sciences |
| Gaston Browne | Prime Minister of Antigua and Barbuda | City Banking College University of Manchester | United Kingdom | Bachelors in Banking and Finance MBA in Finance |
| Javier Milei | President of Argentina | University of Belgrano Instituto de Desarrollo Económico y Social Torcuato di Tella University | Argentina | Bachelors in Economics Master's degree in Economics |
| Nikol Pashinyan | Prime Minister of Armenia | Yerevan State University | Armenia | Journalism (expelled before graduating) |
| Anthony Albanese | Prime Minister of Australia | University of Sydney | Australia | Bachelor of Economics |
| Christian Stocker | Chancellor of Austria | University of Vienna | Austria | Bachelor of Laws, Master of Laws, Doctor of Laws |
| Ali Asadov | Prime Minister of Azerbaijan | Plekhanov Russian University of Economics | USSR | Candidate of Sciences |
| Philip Davis | Prime Minister of the Bahamas | St. John's College (Secondary Education) | Bahamas | |
| Salman bin Hamad Al Khalifa | Prime Minister of Bahrain | American University Queens' College, Cambridge | United StatesUnited Kingdom | Bachelor of Arts in Political science Master of Philosophy |
| Tarique Rahman | Prime Minister of Bangladesh | University of Dhaka | Bangladesh | International relations (dropped out) |
| Mia Mottley | Prime Minister of Barbados | Queen's College London School of EconomicsUniversity of London | BarbadosUnited Kingdom | Bachelor of Laws |
| Alexander Turchin | Prime Minister of Belarus | Belarus State Economic University; Academy of Public Administration | Belarus | |
| Bart De Wever | Prime Minister of Belgium | KU Leuven | Belgium | Licentiate in History |
| Johnny Briceño | List of prime ministers of Belize | St. John's College University of Texas at Austin | BelizeUnited States | Bachelor's degree in Business administration |
| Romuald Wadagni | President of Benin | Grenoble Ecolé de Management Harvard University | France United States | Master's degree in Finance Private Equity and Venture Capital training |
| Tshering Tobgay | Prime Minister of Bhutan | University of Pittsburgh Harvard University | United States | Bachelor of Science in Mechanical Engineering Master of Public Administration |
| Rodrigo Paz | President of Bolivia | American University | United States | Bachelor's in International Relations Master's in Political Management |
| Borjana Krišto | Chairman of the Council of Ministers of Bosnia and Herzegovina | University of Banja Luka | Bosnia and Herzegovina | Bachelor of Laws |
| Duma Boko | President of Botswana | University of Botswana Harvard Law School | BotswanaUnited States | Bachelor of Laws Master of Laws |
| Luiz Inácio Lula da Silva | President of Brazil | National Service for Industrial Training | Brazil | Lathe operation |
| Hassanal Bolkiah | Sultan of Brunei | Royal Military Academy Sandhurst | United Kingdom | |
| Andrey Gyurov | Prime Minister of Bulgaria | Truman State University University of Vienna | United StatesAustria | Bachelor of Arts in Economics PhD in Economics |
| Jean Emmanuel Ouédraogo | Prime Minister of Burkina Faso | University of Ouagadougou | Burkina Faso | Bachelor's degree in Sociology Master's degree in mediation and conflict management |
| Nestor Ntahontuye | Prime Minister of Burundi | University of Burundi | Burundi | Master's in statistics |
| Ulisses Correia e Silva | Prime Minister of Cabo Verde | Technical University of Lisbon | Portugal | Bachelor's degree in Organization and Management |
| Hun Manet | Prime Minister of Cambodia | United States Military Academy New York University University of Bristol | United StatesUnited Kingdom | Bachelor's degree in Economics Master of Arts in Economics Doctor of Philosophy in Economics |
| Joseph Ngute | Prime Minister of Cameroon | University of Yaoundé Queen Mary University of LondonUniversity of Warwick | CameroonUnited Kingdom | Law Master of Laws Doctor of Law |
| Mark Carney | Prime Minister of Canada | Harvard University University of Oxford | United StatesUnited Kingdom | Bachelor of Arts (BA) in Economics Master of Philosophy (MPhil) in Economics Doctor of Philosophy (DPhil) in Economics |
| Félix Moloua | List of heads of government of the Central African Republic | École normale supérieure (Paris) | France | Mathematics |
| Allamaye Halina | Prime Minister of Chad | University of N'Djamena International Relations Institute of Cameroon | ChadCameroon | Bachelor's degree in History and Geography Master's degree in International relations |
| José Antonio Kast | President of Chile | Pontifical Catholic University of Chile | Chile | Bachelor of Laws |
| Xi Jinping | General Secretary of the Chinese Communist Party; President of China | Tsinghua University | China | Chemical Engineering |
| Li Qiang | Premier of China | Zhejiang Wanli University Hong Kong Polytechnic University | China | Master of Business Administration |
| Gustavo Petro | President of Colombia | Universidad Externado de Colombia Escuela Superior de Administración Pública | Colombia | Bachelor of Arts (BA) in Economics Master's in Economics (Dropped out) |
| Azali Assoumani | President of Comoros | Meknes Royal Military Academy | Morocco | |
| Anatole Collinet Makosso | Prime Minister of the Republic of Congo | Paris 2 Panthéon-Assas University | France | Doctor of Law |
| Rodrigo Chaves Robles | President of Costa Rica | Ohio State University | United States | Bachelor of Science Master of Arts PhD in Economics |
| Andrej Plenković | Prime Minister of Croatia | University of Zagreb | Croatia | Bachelor of Laws Master of Laws |
| Miguel Díaz-Canel | First Secretary of the Communist Party of Cuba; President of Cuba | University "Marta Abreu" of Las Villas | Cuba | Bachelor's degree in Electrical Engineering |
| Nikos Christodoulides | President of Cyprus | Queens College, City University of New York University of Malta National and Kapodistrian University of Athens | United StatesMaltaGreece | Bachelor of Science Master's degree in Diplomatic Studies PHD in Political Science and Administration |
| Andrej Babiš | Prime Minister of the Czech Republic | Bratislava University of Economics and Business | Slovakia | Bachelor's degree in International Trade |
| Judith Suminwa | Prime Minister of the Democratic Republic of the Congo | UCLouvain FUCaM Mons Université libre de Bruxelles | Belgium | Bachelor's degree in Applied Economics Master's degree in Labor Studies |
| Mette Frederiksen | Prime Minister of Denmark | Aalborg University University of Copenhagen | Denmark | Bachelor's degree in Social Science Master's degree in African Studies |
| Abdoulkader Kamil Mohamed | Prime Minister of Djibouti | University of Limoges | France | Technical Sciences |
| Roosevelt Skerrit | Prime Minister of Dominica | New Mexico State University at Las Cruces University of Mississippi | United States | Bachelor of Science in Psychology Bachelor of Arts in English |
| Luis Abinader | President of the Dominican Republic | Santo Domingo Institute of Technology Hult International Business SchoolHarvard UniversityDartmouth College | Dominican RepublicUnited States | Economics Corporate Finance Advanced Management |
| Daniel Noboa | President of Ecuador | New York University Northwestern University George Washington University | United States | Bachelor of Business Administration Master of Business Administration Master's degree in Political Communication and Strategic Governance |
| Mostafa Madbouly | Prime Minister of Egypt | Cairo University | Egypt | Master's degree in engineering PhD in engineering |
| Nayib Bukele | President of El Salvador | Central American University | El Salvador | Law (didn't finish degree) |
| Manuel Osa Nsue Nsua | Prime Minister of Equatorial Guinea | University of the Balearic Islands Pompeu Fabra University | Spain | Bachelor's degree in Business and Economics Master's degree in Financial Management and Business Accounting |
| Isaias Afwerki | President of Eritrea | Addis Ababa University | Ethiopia | |
| Kristen Michal | Prime Minister of Estonia | University Nord | Estonia | Bachelor's degree in Law |
| Russell Dlamini | Prime Minister of Eswatini | University of Eswatini Stellenbosch University University of South Africa | EswatiniSouth Africa | Bachelor's degree in Agricultural Science Master's degree in Sustainable Development Planning and Management Bachelor's degree in Development Administration |
| Abiy Ahmed | Prime Minister of Ethiopia | Microlink Information Technology College University of Greenwich Ashland University Addis Ababa University | EthiopiaUnited KingdomUnited States | Bachelor's degree in Computer Engineering Master of Arts in Transformational Leadership MBA PhD |
| Sitiveni Rabuka | Prime Minister of Fiji | University of Madras | India | Master's degree in Military Science |
| Petteri Orpo | Prime Minister of Finland | University of Turku | Finland | Master's degree in Political Science |
| Sébastien Lecornu | Prime Minister of France | Paris-Panthéon-Assas University | France | Bachelor of Laws Master of Laws (Dropped Out) |
| Hermann Immongault | Vice President of the Government of Gabon | Omar Bongo University Université Laval Sciences Po | GabonCanadaFrance | Bachelor's degree in Modern Literature Bachelor's degree in Political Science Master of International Relations DEA in International Relations |
| Adama Barrow | President of the Gambia | Muslim Senior Secondary School | Gambia | |
| Irakli Kobakhidze | Prime Minister of Georgia | Tbilisi State University Heinrich Heine University Düsseldorf | GeorgiaGermany | Bachelor of Laws Master of Laws Doctor of Laws |
| Friedrich Merz | Chancellor of Germany | University of Bonn Marburg University | Germany | Bachelor of Laws |
| John Mahama | President of Ghana | University of Ghana | Ghana | Bachelor of Arts in History |
| Kyriakos Mitsotakis | Prime Minister of Greece | Harvard University Stanford University Harvard Business School | United States | Bachelor's degree in Social Studies Ford Dorsey Master's in International Policy MBA |
| Dickon Mitchell | Prime Minister of Grenada | University of the West Indies at Cave Hill University of the West Indies, St Augustine | BarbadosTrinidad and Tobago | Bachelor of Laws |
| Bernardo Arévalo | President of Guatemala | Hebrew University of Jerusalem Utrecht University | IsraelNetherlands | Bachelor's degree in Sociology Doctor of Philosophy in Social Anthropology |
| Bah Oury | Prime Minister of Guinea | Lycée Louis-le-Grand | France | |
| Ilídio Vieira Té | Prime Minister of Guinea-Bissau | Pablo de Olavide University | Spain | Bachelor's degree in Public law Master's degree in Intercultural Human Rights and Development |
| Mark Phillips | Prime Minister of Guyana | University of Guyana Pontificia Universidad Católica Madre y Maestra | GuyanaDominican Republic | Bachelor's degree in Social Science and Public Management Master of Science in Public Sector Management |
| Alix Didier Fils-Aimé | Prime Minister of Haiti | Boston University | United States | Bachelor's degree in Management |
| Nasry Asfura | President of Honduras | Universidad Nacional Autónoma de Honduras | Honduras | Civil engineering (Dropped Out) |
| Viktor Orbán | Prime Minister of Hungary | Eötvös Loránd University Pembroke College, Oxford | HungaryUnited Kingdom | Juris Doctor |
| Kristrún Frostadóttir | Prime Minister of Iceland | University of Iceland Yale Jackson School of Global Affairs Boston University | Iceland | Bachelor's degree Master's degree in International Studies Master's degree in Economics |
| Narendra Modi | Prime Minister of India | Delhi University Gujarat University | India | Bachelor of Arts in Political Science Master's degree in Political Science |
| Prabowo Subianto | President of Indonesia | Indonesian Military Academy | Indonesia | Bachelor's degree |
| Masoud Pezeshkian | President of Iran | Iran University of Medical Sciences | Iran | Doctor of Medicine |
| Mohammed Shia' al-Sudani | Prime Minister of Iraq | University of Baghdad | Iraq | Bachelor's degree in Agricultural Science Master's degree in Project Management |
| Micheál Martin | Taoiseach | University College Cork | Ireland | Bachelor of Arts Master of Arts in Political History |
| Benjamin Netanyahu | Prime Minister of Israel | Massachusetts Institute of Technology Harvard University | United States | Bachelor in Architecture Master's degree in Management |
| Giorgia Meloni | Prime Minister of Italy | Istituto tecnico professionale (High School) | Italy | |
| Robert Beugré Mambé | Prime Minister of Ivory Coast | National School of Public Works | Ivory Coast | Civil Engineering |
| Andrew Holness | Prime Minister of Jamaica | University of the West Indies | Jamaica | Bachelor of Science in Management Studies Master of Science in Management Studies |
| Sanae Takaichi | Prime Minister of Japan | Kobe University | Japan | Bachelor of Business Administration |
| Jafar Hassan | Prime Minister of Jordan | American University of Paris Harvard University Boston University Geneva Graduate Institute | FranceUnited StatesSwitzerland | Bachelor's degree in International Relations Master of Public Administration Master's degree in International Relations PHD in Political Science |
| Oljas Bektenov | Prime Minister of Kazakhstan | Kazakh State Law Academy | Kazakhstan | Bachelor of Laws Candidate of Sciences in Jurisprudence |
| William Ruto | President of Kenya | University of Nairobi | Kenya | Bachelor of Science in Botany & Zoology Master of Science in Plant Biology PhD in Plant Ecology |
| Taneti Maamau | President of Kiribati | University of the South PacificUniversity of Sydney University of Queensland | FijiAustralia | Master's degree in International Trade |
| Ahmad Al-Abdullah Al-Sabah | Prime Minister of Kuwait | University of Illinois Urbana-Champaign | United States | Bachelor's degree in Finance |
| Adylbek Kasymaliev | Chairman of the Cabinet of Ministers of Kyrgyzstan | Leningrad Financial-Economic Institute | Soviet Union | Bachelor's degree in Economics |
| Thongloun Sisoulith | General Secretary of the Lao People's Revolutionary Party; President of Laos | Pedagogical College of Neo Lao Hak Sat Herzen University Russian Academy of Sciences | LaosRussia | Pedagogy |
| Evika Siliņa | Prime Minister of Latvia | University of Latvia Riga Graduate School of Law | Latvia | Bachelor of Laws Master's degree in Social Sciences, International Law, and European Law |
| Nawaf Salam | Prime Minister of Lebanon | Sorbonne University Harvard Law School Sciences Po | FranceUnited StatesFrance | Doctorate in History Master of Laws Doctorate in Political science |
| Sam Matekane | Prime Minister of Lesotho | Mabathoana High School | Lesotho | |
| Joseph Boakai | President of Liberia | University of Liberia | Liberia | Bachelor of Business Administration |
| Abdul Hamid Dbeibeh | Prime Minister of Libya | University of Toronto | Canada | Claimed masters degree, denied by University of Toronto |
| Brigitte Haas | Prime Minister of Liechtenstein | University of Zurich | Switzerland | Licentiate |
| Inga Ruginienė | Prime Minister of Lithuania | Vilnius University | Lithuania | Master's degree in Public health |
| Luc Frieden | Prime Minister of Luxembourg | Paris 1 Panthéon-Sorbonne University Harvard Law School | FranceUnited States | Bachelor's degree in Business Law Master of Laws |
| Mamitiana Rajaonarison | Prime Minister of Madagascar | Antsirabe Military Academy École nationale d'administration Madagascar Institute of Political Studies | MadagascarFranceMadagascar | Military Diploma Diploma in Institution Administration Master's degree in Political Science |
| Peter Mutharika | President of Malawi | University of London Yale Law School | UKUnited States | Bachelor of Laws Master of Laws Doctor of Juridical Science |
| Anwar Ibrahim | Prime Minister of Malaysia | University of Malaya National University of Malaysia | Malaysia | Bachelor of Arts in Malay Studies Master's degree in Literature |
| Mohamed Muizzu | President of the Maldives | University College London University of Leeds | United Kingdom | Bachelor of Engineering in Structural Engineering Master of Science in Civil Engineering Doctor of Philosophy in Civil Engineering |
| Abdoulaye Maïga | List of prime ministers of Mali | Jean Moulin University Lyon 3 | France | Doctorate in International Security and Defense |
| Robert Abela | Prime Minister of Malta | University of Malta | Malta | Bachelor of Laws |
| Hilda Heine | President of the Marshall Islands | University of Oregon University of Hawaiʻi at Mānoa University of Southern California | United States | Bachelor of Arts Master of Education Doctor of Education |
| Mokhtar Ould Djay | List of prime ministers of Mauritania | National Institute of Statistics and Applied Economics University of Toulouse | MoroccoFrance | Bachelor of Engineering Master's degree in Statistics and Econometrics |
| Navin Ramgoolam | Prime Minister of Mauritius | Royal College of Physicians of Ireland London School of Economics | IrelandUnited Kingdom | Bachelor of Medicine, Bachelor of Surgery Bachelor of Laws |
| Claudia Sheinbaum | President of Mexico | National Autonomous University of Mexico | Mexico | Bachelor's degree in Physics Master's degree Doctor of Philosophy in Energy Engineering |
| Wesley Simina | President of the Federated States of Micronesia | United States International University William S. Richardson School of Law | United States | Bachelor of Arts Juris Doctor |
| Christophe Mirmand | Minister of State (Monaco) | Sciences Po École nationale d'administration | France | Bachelor's degree in History Master's degree in International & European Law |
| Vasile Tofan | Prime Minister of Moldova | Erasmus University Rotterdam Harvard Business School | NetherlandsUnited States | Bachelor's degree in Public Management Master of Business Administration |
| Nyam-Osoryn Uchral | Prime Minister of Mongolia | Ikh Zasag International University Limkokwing University of Creative Technology Mongolian National University of Education Siberian Branch of the Russian Academy of Sciences | MongoliaUnited KingdomMongoliaRussia | Bachelor of Laws Master of Business Administration Master's degree in Historical Sciences Doctor of Philosophy in Historical Sciences |
| Milojko Spajić | Prime Minister of Montenegro | University of Osaka Saitama University HEC Paris | JapanFrance | Bachelor's degree in Econometrics Master's degree in Business |
| Aziz Akhannouch | Prime Minister of Morocco | Université de Sherbrooke | Canada | Management Diploma |
| Maria Benvinda Levy | Prime Minister of Mozambique | Eduardo Mondlane University | Mozambique | Licentiate in Jurisprudence |
| Min Aung Hlaing | Chairman of the State Administration Council | Rangoon Arts and Science University | Myanmar | Bachelor of Laws |
| Elijah Ngurare | Prime Minister of Namibia | Central State University University of Dundee University College Cork | United StatesUKIreland | Bachelor of Science in Water Resources Management and International Relations Master of Laws Doctor of Philosophy in Environmental law |
| David Adeang | President of Nauru | University of the South Pacific | Fiji | Bachelor's degree in Economics Master's degree in Diplomacy & Trade |
| Balen Shah | Prime Minister of Nepal | Himalayan WhiteHouse International College NITTE | NepalIndia | Bachelor of Engineering in Civil Engineering Master of Engineering in Structural Engineering |
| Rob Jetten | Prime Minister of the Netherlands | Radboud University Nijmegen | Netherlands | Bachelor of Arts in Public Administration Master of Arts in Public Administration |
| Christopher Luxon | Prime Minister of New Zealand | University of Canterbury | New Zealand | Bachelor of Commerce Master of Commerce |
| Daniel Ortega | Co-presidents of Nicaragua | Central American University, Managua | Nicaragua | Bachelor of Laws (Didn't Complete) |
| Rosario Murillo | Co-presidents of Nicaragua | National Autonomous University of Nicaragua | Nicaragua | (Didn't Complete) |
| Ali Lamine Zeine | List of prime ministers of Niger | Paris 1 Panthéon-Sorbonne University | France | Bachelor of Science in Economics |
| Bola Tinubu | President of Nigeria | Richard J. Daley College Chicago State University | United States | Bachelor of Science in Business Administration |
| Kim Jong-un | General Secretary of the Workers' Party of Korea; President of the State Affairs | Kim Il-sung University Kim Il-sung Military University | North Korea | Bachelor's degree in Physics |
| Hristijan Mickoski | Prime Minister of North Macedonia | Ss. Cyril and Methodius University of Skopje | North Macedonia | Doctorate in Mechatronics |
| Jonas Gahr Støre | Prime Minister of Norway | Sciences Po | France | Master's degree in Political science |
| Haitham bin Tariq | List of rulers of Oman | Oxford University Diplomatic Studies Programme | United Kingdom | Master of Studies in Diplomatic Studies |
| Shehbaz Sharif | Prime Minister of Pakistan | Government College University, Lahore | Pakistan | Bachelor of Arts |
| Surangel Whipps Jr. | President of Palau | Andrews University University of California, Los Angeles | United States | Business Administration and Economics MBA |
| Mohammad Mustafa | Prime Minister of Palestine | University of Baghdad George Washington University | IraqUnited States | Bachelor's degree in Electrical Engineering Master's degree PhD in Management & Economics |
| José Raúl Mulino | President of Panama | Universidad Católica Santa María La Antigua Tulane University | PanamaUnited States | Bachelor's degree Master of Laws in Maritime Law |
| James Marape | Prime Minister of Papua New Guinea | University of Papua New Guinea | Papua New Guinea | Bachelor of Arts |
| Santiago Peña | President of Paraguay | Universidad Católica Nuestra Señora de la Asunción Columbia University | ParaguayUnited States | Bachelor of Economics Master of Public Administration |
| Luis Arroyo Sánchez | President of the Council of Ministers of Peru | | Peru | |
| Bongbong Marcos | President of the Philippines | St Edmund Hall, Oxford Wharton School | United KingdomUnited States | Special Diploma Master of Business Administration(Dropped out) |
| Donald Tusk | Prime Minister of Poland | University of Gdańsk | Poland | Bachelor of Arts in History |
| Luís Montenegro | Prime Minister of Portugal | Catholic University of Portugal | Portugal | Bachelor of Laws |
| Mohammed bin Abdulrahman bin Jassim Al Thani | Prime Minister of Qatar | Qatar University | Qatar | Bachelor's degree in Economics and Business Administration |
| Ilie Bolojan | Prime Minister of Romania | West University of Timișoara Politehnica University of Timișoara | Romania | Bachelor's degree in Mathematics |
| Mikhail Mishustin | Prime Minister of Russia | STANKIN Plekhanov Russian University of Economics Russian Presidential Academy of National Economy and Public Administration | Russia | Bachelor's degree in Systems Engineering PhD in Economics Doctor of Science in Economics |
| Justin Nsengiyumva | Prime Minister of Rwanda | Catholic University of Eastern Africa University of Nairobi University of Leicester | KenyaUnited Kingdom | Bachelor of Commerce Master's degree in Economic Policy PhD in Economics |
| Terrance Drew | List of prime ministers of Saint Kitts and Nevis | Universidad de Ciencias Médicas de Villa Clara Texas Tech University Health Sciences Center | CubaUnited States | Medicine Doctor of Medicine |
| Philip J. Pierre | Prime minister of Saint Lucia | Saint Mary's College University of the West Indies | Saint LuciaJamaica | Bachelor of Arts in Economics MBA |
| Godwin Friday | Prime Minister of Saint Vincent and the Grenadines | University of Waterloo Queen's University at Kingston | Canada | Bachelor of Arts in History & Political Science Bachelor of Laws Master of Arts in History Doctorate in Political Studies |
| Laʻauli Leuatea Schmidt | Prime Minister of Samoa | | Samoa | |
| Luca Beccari | San Marino Secretary for Foreign Affairs | University of Urbino | Italy | Accounting and Economics |
| Américo Ramos | Prime Minister of Sao Tome | Moscow State University | Russia | Bachelor's degree in Economics |
| Mohammed bin Salman | Prime Minister of Saudi Arabia | King Saud University | Saudi Arabia | Bachelor of Laws |
| Bassirou Diomaye Faye | President of Senegal | Cheikh Anta Diop University | Senegal | Master of Laws |
| Đuro Macut | Prime Minister of Serbia | University of Belgrade | Serbia | Bachelor of Medicine, Bachelor of Surgery Master of Medicine Doctor of Medicine |
| Patrick Herminie | President of the Seychelles | University of Leeds Charles University | United KingdomCzech | Doctor of Medicine Masters of Public Health |
| David Moinina Sengeh | Chief Minister of Sierra Leone | Harvard University Massachusetts Institute of Technology | United States | Bachelor's degree in Engineering Doctor of Philosophy in Biomechatronics |
| Lawrence Wong | Prime Minister of Singapore | University of Wisconsin-Madison University of Michigan; Harvard University | United States | Bachelor of Science (BS) in Economics Master of Arts (MA) in Applied Economics; Master of Public Administration(MPA) |
| Robert Fico | Prime Minister of Slovakia | Comenius University Slovak Academy of Sciences | Slovakia | Juris Doctor Candidate of Sciences |
| Robert Golob | Prime Minister of Slovenia | University of Ljubljana | Slovenia | Bachelor of Science in Electrical Engineering Master of Science in Electrical Engineering Doctor of Philosophy in Electrical Engineering |
| Jeremiah Manele | Prime Minister of Solomon Islands | University of Papua New Guinea University of Oxford | Papua New GuineaUnited Kingdom | Bachelor of Arts in Politics and Public Administration Certificate in Foreign Service and International Relations |
| Hamza Abdi Barre | Prime minister of Somalia | University of Science and Technology (Yemen) International Islamic University Malaysia | YemenMalaysia | Bachelor of Arts in Management Master of Business Administration |
| Cyril Ramaphosa | President of South Africa | University of Limpopo University of South Africa | South Africa | Bachelor of Laws |
| Lee Jae Myung | President of South Korea | Chung-Ang University Gachon University | South Korea | Bachelor of Laws Master of Public Administration |
| Salva Kiir | President of Republic of South Sudan | Elementary School | South Sudan | |
| Pedro Sánchez | Prime Minister of Spain | Complutense University of MadridUniversité libre de Bruxelles IESE Business SchoolUniversidad Camilo José Cela | SpainBelgium | Bachelor's degree in Economics Master's degree in EU Economics Diploma in Advanced European Economic and Monetary Integration Studies Doctorate in Economics |
| Anura Kumara Dissanayake | President of Sri Lanka | University of Kelaniya | Sri Lanka | Bachelor of Science in Physical Science |
| Harini Amarasuriya | Prime Minister of Sri Lanka | Delhi University Macquarie University University of Edinburgh | India Australia Scotland | Bachelor of Arts in Sociology Masters of Arts in Applied Anthropology and Development PhD in Social Anthropology |
| Kamil Idris | List of heads of government of Sudan | University of Khartoum Cairo University Ohio University Geneva Graduate Institute | SudanEgyptUnited StatesSwitzerland | Bachelor of Laws Bachelor of Arts in Philosophy, Political Science and Economic Theories Master's degree in International Law Doctorate in International Law |
| Jennifer Geerlings-Simons | President of Suriname | Anton de Kom University of Suriname | Suriname | Doctorandus |
| Ulf Kristersson | Prime Minister of Sweden | Uppsala University | Sweden | Bachelor's degree in Economics |
| Viktor Rossi | Chancellor of Switzerland | University of Bern | Switzerland | Teacher's Degree |
| Ahmed al-Sharaa | President of Syria | Damascus University | Syria | Dropped Out |
| Kokhir Rasulzoda | Prime Minister of Tajikistan | Agricultural University of TajikistanRussian Presidential Academy of National Economy and Public Administration | TajikistanRussia | Hydraulic Engineering Technical Science |
| Mwigulu Nchemba | Prime Minister of Tanzania | University of Dar es Salaam | Tanzania | Bachelor's degree in Economics Master's degree in Economics PhD in Economics |
| Anutin Charnvirakul | Prime Minister of Thailand | Hofstra University Thammasat University | USThailand | Bachelor of Engineering Master of Business Administration |
| Xanana Gusmão | Prime Minister of Timor-Leste | Dili High School | Timor-Leste | |
| Faure Gnassingbé | Prime Minister of Togo | Paris Dauphine University George Washington University | FranceUnited States | Bachelor's degree in Financial Business Management Master of Business Administration |
| Fatafehi Fakafānua | Prime Minister of Tonga | O. P. Jindal Global University | India | Master of Arts in Diplomacy, Law, and Business |
| Kamla Persad-Bissessar | Prime Minister of Trinidad and Tobago | University of the West Indies at Cave Hill Hugh Wooding Law School | BarbadosTrinidad and Tobago | Bachelor of Arts Diploma of Education Legal Education Certificate Bachelor of Laws Master of Business Administration |
| Sara Zaafarani | Prime Minister of Tunisia | National Engineering School of Tunis Leibniz University Hannover | TunisiaGermany | Bachelor's degree in Civil Engineering Master's degree in Geotechnical Engineering |
| Recep Tayyip Erdoğan | President of Turkey | Marmara University | Turkey | Disputed |
| Serdar Berdimuhamedow | President of Turkmenistan | Turkmen Agricultural University Named after S.A. Niyazov Diplomatic Academy of the Ministry of Foreign Affairs of the Russian FederationTurkmen Academy of Sciences | TurkmenistanRussia | Engineering International Relations PhD in Technical Sciences |
| Feleti Teo | Prime Minister of Tuvalu | University of Canterbury Australian National University | New ZealandAustralia | Bachelor of Laws Master of Laws |
| Yoweri Museveni | President of Uganda | University of Dar es Salaam | Tanzania | Bachelor of Arts in Economics |
| Yulia Svyrydenko | Prime Minister of Ukraine | State University of Trade and Economics | Ukraine | Bachelors in Economics Master's in Economics |
| Mohammed bin Rashid Al Maktoum | Prime Minister of the United Arab Emirates | Mons Officer Cadet School | United Kingdom | Officer |
| Keir Starmer | Prime Minister of the United Kingdom | University of Leeds; University of Oxford | United Kingdom | Bachelor of Laws (LLB) (Honours); Bachelor of Civil Law |
| Donald Trump | President of the United States | University of Pennsylvania | United States | Bachelor of Science (BS) in Economics |
| Yamandú Orsi | President of Uruguay | Instituto de Profesores Artigas | Uruguay | Teaching |
| Abdulla Aripov | Prime Minister of Uzbekistan | Tashkent University of Information Technologies | Uzbekistan | |
| Jotham Napat | Prime Minister of Vanuatu | Royal Melbourne Institute of Technology Revans University | AustraliaUnited Kingdom | Diploma in Meteorology Master of Business Administration |
| Delcy Rodríguez | President of Venezuela | Central University of Venezuela | Venezuela | Bachelor of Laws |
| Tô Lâm | General Secretary of the Communist Party of Vietnam | Vietnam People's Security Academy | Vietnam | Doctor of Laws |
| Lương Cường | President of Vietnam | Political Officer Training School | Vietnam | Bachelor's degree in Party Building and State Administration |
| Phạm Minh Chính | Prime Minister of Vietnam | Hanoi University Technical University of Civil Engineering of Bucharest | VietnamRomania | Romanian and Civil Engineering Doctor of Law |
| Shaya al-Zindani | Prime Minister of Yemen | University of Aden University of Oxford | YemenUnited Kingdom | Bachelor of Laws Higher Diploma in Philosophy Doctorate in the Philosophy of Law |
| Hakainde Hichilema | President of Zambia | University of Zambia University of Birmingham | ZambiaUnited Kingdom | Bachelor's degree in Economics and Business Administration MBA |
| Emmerson Mnangagwa | President of Zimbabwe | University of London University of Zambia | United KingdomZambia | Bachelor of Laws |
