= Second inauguration of Ali Bongo =

Inauguration of Ali Bongo Ondimba
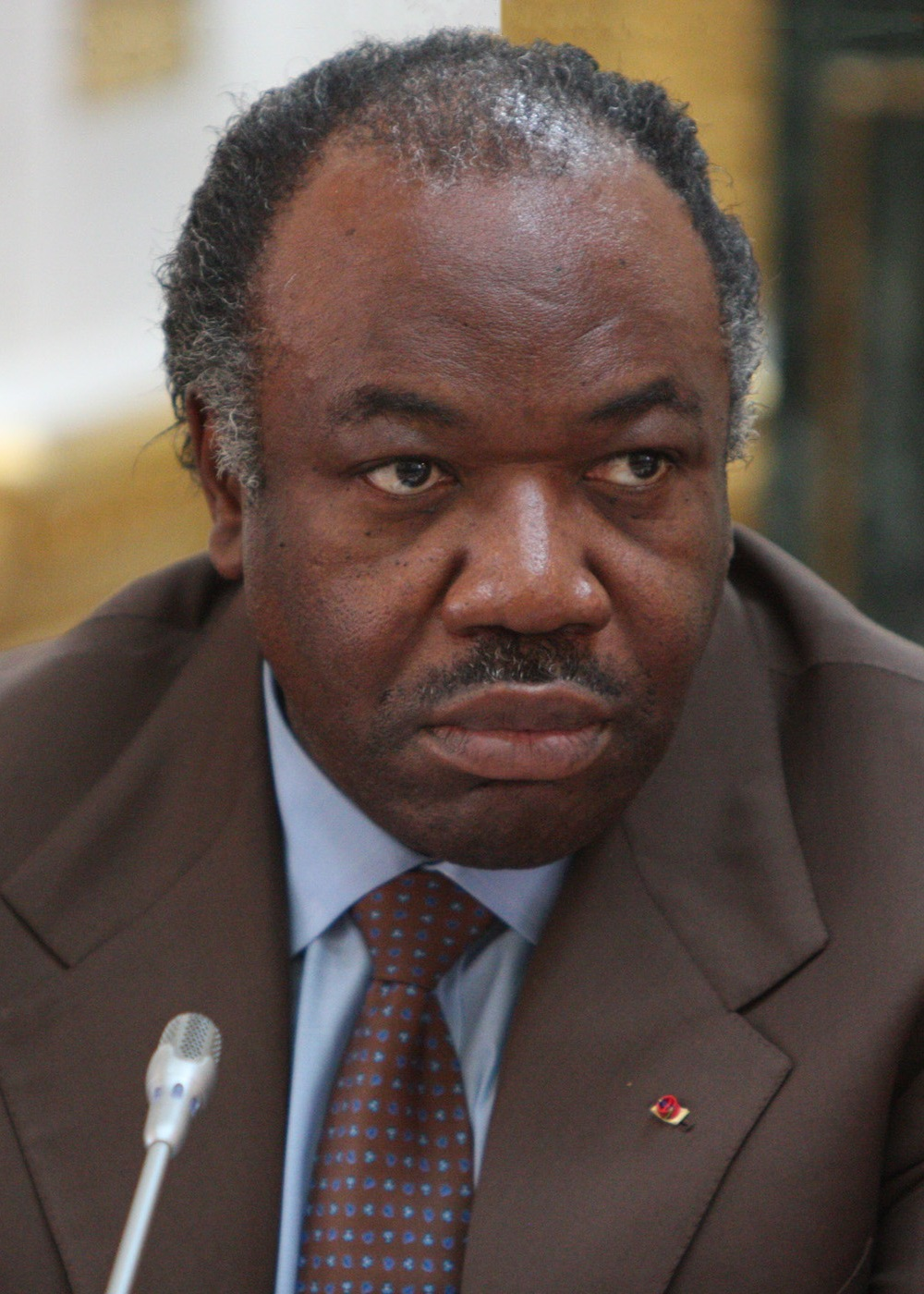
- Date: 27 September 2016
- Location: Presidential Palace, Libreville
- Participants: President: Ali Bongo Ondimba

The second inauguration of Ali Bongo Ondimba for his second seven-year term as the third president of Gabon occurred on 27 September 2016 after the August 2016 presidential election. This was the second time Ali Bongo took the oath after he was first sworn into office on 16 October 2016.

The inauguration took place despite the violence and tension in the country after Bongo won the election on a thin margin of only 6000 votes. The opposition, led by Jean Ping, denounced the election results as fraudulent. The inauguration was kept low profile to prevent any violence between the two parties.

== Dignitaries in attendance ==
Country	Title	Dignitary
Mali	President	Ibrahim Boubacar Keïta
Niger	President	Mahamadou Issoufou
Sao Tome and Principe	President	Evaristo Carvalho
Togo	President	Faure Gnassingbé

=== Government representatives ===
Country	Title	Dignitary
Morocco	Head of Government	Abdelilah Benkirane
