= 2016 Gabonese presidential election =

- 27 August 2016
- Registered: 627,805
- Turnout: 59.46%
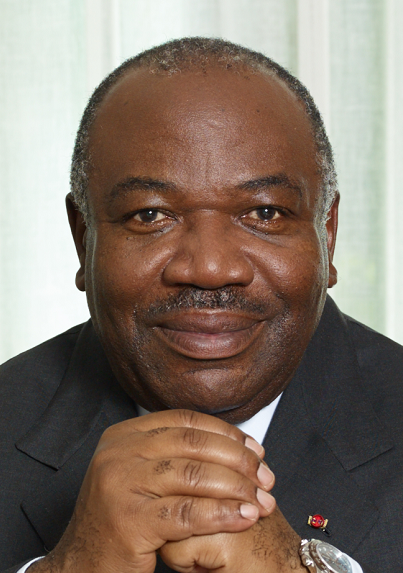

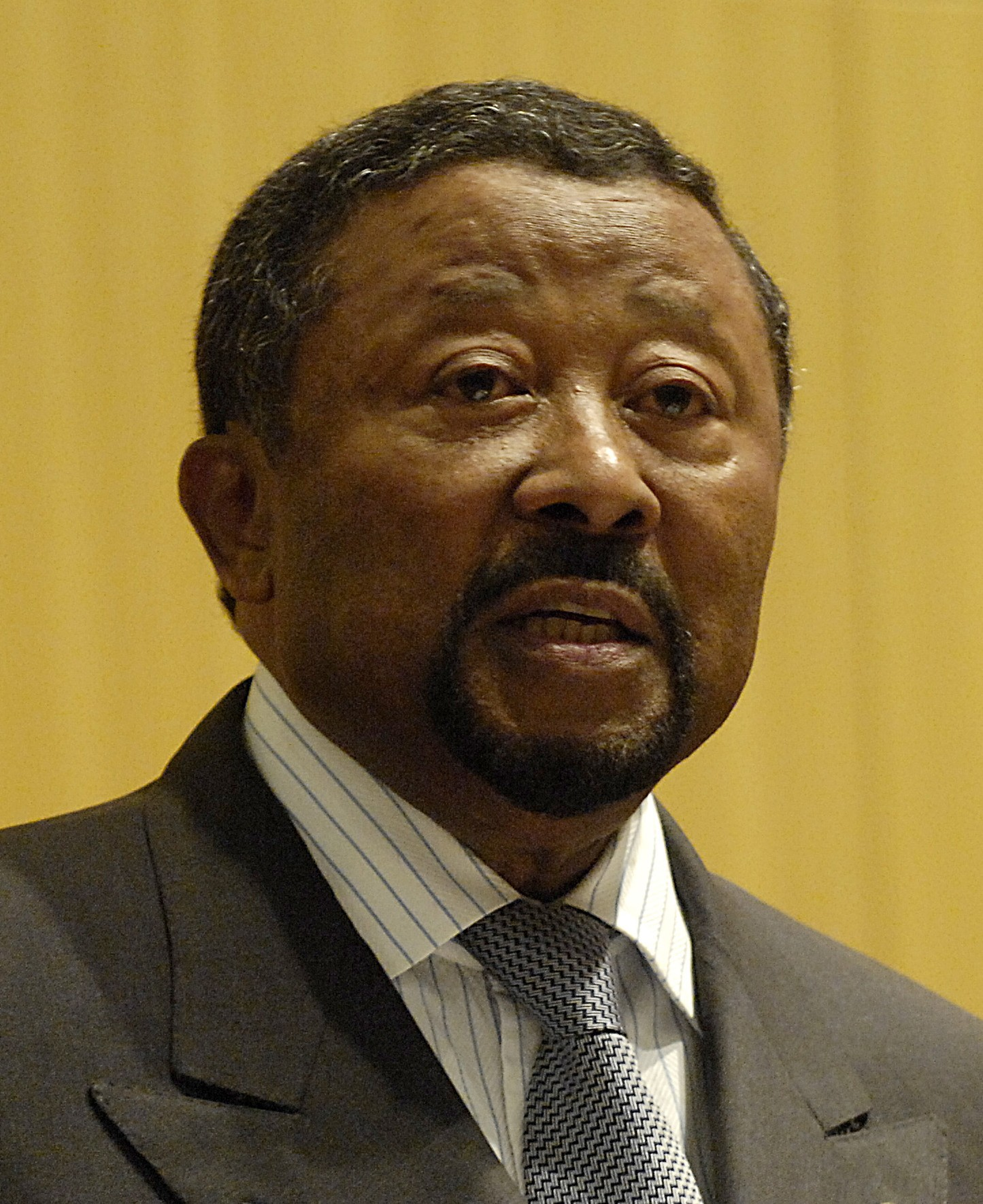
Nominee	Ali Bongo	Jean Ping
Party	PDG	UFC
Popular vote	177,722	172,128
Percentage	49.80%	48.23%

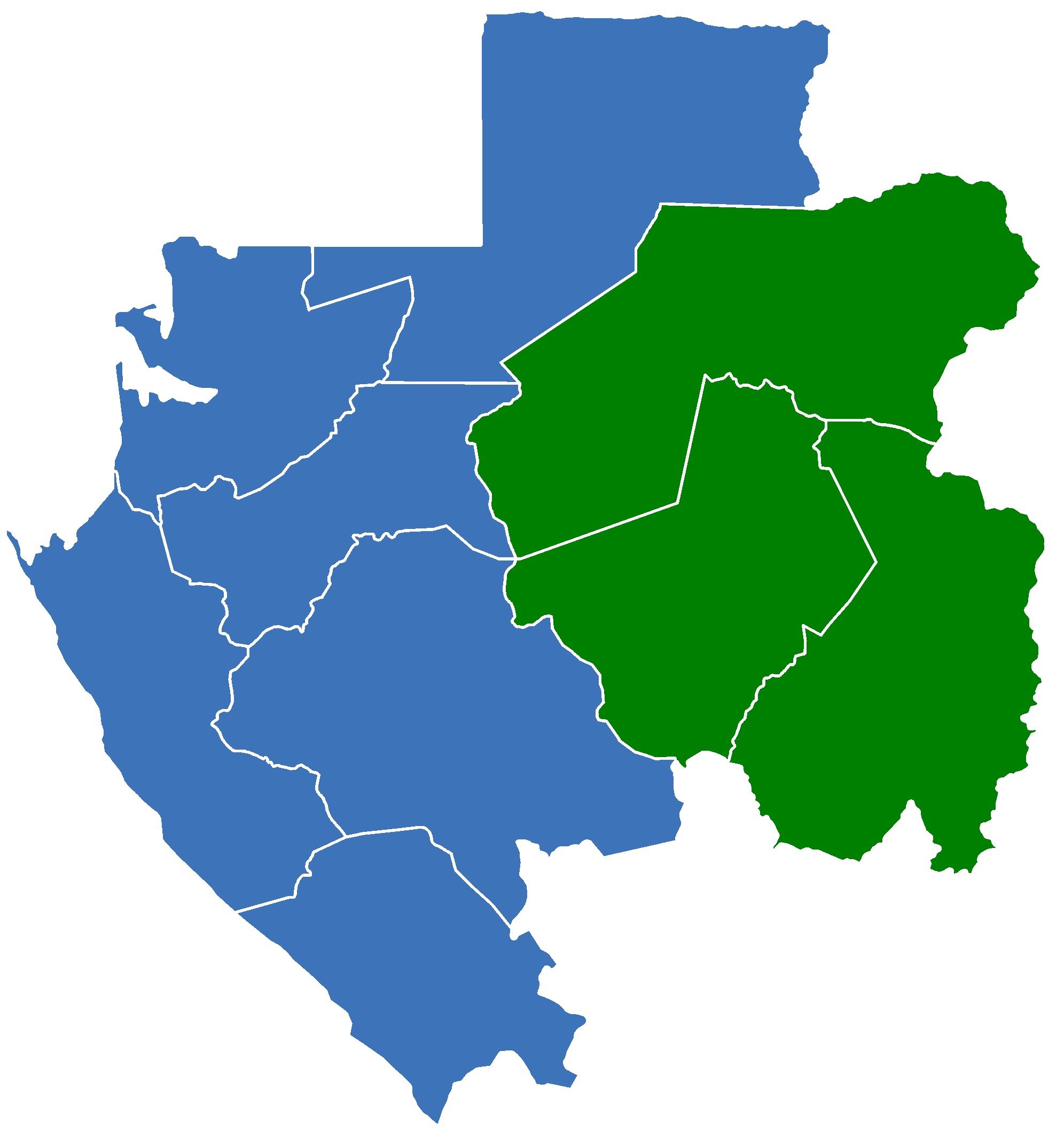
President before election
Ali Bongo
PDG
Elected President
Ali Bongo
PDG

Presidential elections were held in Gabon on 27 August 2016. Incumbent President Ali Bongo ran for re-election and was challenged by former Minister of Foreign Affairs Jean Ping. On 31 August, the electoral commission proclaimed Bongo's re-election with a margin of less than two percent. Large protests broke out in the capital Libreville after the results were announced. Irregularities such as Haut-Ogoou showing that 99.9% of the electorate had voted and Bongo had received 95.5% of the votes led to observers questioning the conduct of the election.

== Electoral system ==
The President of Gabon is elected for a seven-year term in a single round of voting by plurality; whichever candidate places first is deemed elected, regardless of whether the candidate secured an absolute majority of votes. This system is thought to be a disadvantage to the fractious opposition, which would appear to have little chance of winning unless it unites behind a single candidate.

== Candidates ==
Nineteen prospective candidates submitted applications to stand, and the Autonomous and Permanent National Electoral Commission (CENAP) announced on 15 July 2016 that fourteen of them had been deemed eligible. President Ali Bongo Ondimba announced in Port-Gentil on 29 February 2016 that he would stand for re-election. CENAP approved the candidacy of President Bongo despite a long-standing controversy about his eligibility; his opponents claimed that he was not Gabonese by birth and was an adopted rather than biological son of Omar Bongo. Due to the presence of representatives of the opposition, there was no consensus regarding Bongo's candidacy, and it was therefore approved by majority vote.

Jean Ping, a prominent diplomat standing as the candidate of the Union of the Forces of Change, and viewed by some as Bongo's most serious challenger, was also approved to stand. The other candidates to be approved were Casimir Oye Mba of the National Union, Paul Mba Abessole of the Rally for Gabon, Pierre Claver Maganga Moussavou of the Social Democratic Party, Augustin Moussavou King of the Gabonese Socialist Party, and several independent candidates: Guy Nzouba Ndama, Raymond Ndong Sima, Bruno Ben Moubamba, Laurent Désiré Aba'a Minko, Gérard Ella Nguema, Abel Mbombe Nzoudou, Dieudonné Minlama Mintogo, and Léon Paul Ngoulakia.

== Campaign ==
The official campaign period began on 13 August 2016. Speaking at a campaign rally, Bongo dismissed the controversy about his parentage, noting that "the burden of proof rests on the one who makes the accusation" and arguing that the opposition was focusing on the issue "because they don't have a good program". In an interview he criticized the opposition's focus on "ridiculous things" rather than his record as President over the previous seven years. While campaigning, he spoke about fighting corruption and highlighted his record of infrastructure development. His campaign slogan was "Let's change together".

Eventually, in mid-August, key opposition candidates decided to unite behind Jean Ping in order to improve the opposition's chances of defeating Bongo, as holding the vote in a single round would presumably work heavily to Bongo's advantage as long as the opposition remained fragmented. Guy Nzouba Ndama, Casimir Oye Mba, Léon Paul Ngoulakia, and Aba'a Minko withdrew their candidacies to support Ping. The government criticized the move to rally behind Ping as "horse trading whose only aim is to share out privilege and power".

As the main opposition leaders had served prominently under Omar Bongo (and then gone into opposition after his death), Ping was characterized as the candidate of "the old guard of Bongo senior's cronies". Having already been abandoned by many of Omar Bongo's top associates in 2009, Bongo was undermined in subsequent years by the continuing defection of prominent politicians from the ruling Gabonese Democratic Party, such as Guy Nzouba Ndama and Léon Paul Ngoulakia. A weakening economy due to the decline in oil prices was thought to have contributed to dissatisfaction with the government and was considered a factor that could improve the opposition's chances.

== Results ==
The election was held on 27 August 2016. On the day after the elections, Ping declared victory and said that he was "waiting for the outgoing president to call to congratulate me", although no results had been officially announced. Only the electoral commission was legally permitted to announce results, and the Minister of the Interior, Pacôme Moubelet-Boubeya, accused Ping of "attempt[ing] to manipulate the democratic process", while Bongo said that "you must not sell the skin of the bear before you've killed him". Nevertheless, Bongo's spokesman, Alain Claude Bilie By Nzé, asserted that Bongo was ahead and would be re-elected. Official results were scheduled to be announced on 30 August, but on that date it was stated that the announcement would be delayed by a few hours.

Results were finally announced on 31 August, showing a narrow victory for Bongo, who won 49.8% of the vote against 48.2% for Ping. Turnout was placed at 59.5%. The opposition's representatives on the electoral commission refused to confirm the results, and they were therefore confirmed by a vote in which the opposition members abstained. Ping's supporters maintained that the mostly complete results they had independently collected showed their candidate beating Bongo by a large margin, 59% to 38%. Notably, the official results from Haut-Ogooue (the Bongo family's native province) showed Bongo receiving 95.5% of the vote on an alleged 99.9% turnout, an impossible result sparking widespread protests. Bongo, noting that the vote was close, stressed the importance of peacefully respecting this outcome.

Candidate	Party	Votes	%
Ali Bongo Ondimba	Gabonese Democratic Party	177,722	49.80
Jean Ping	Union of Forces for Change	172,128	48.23
Bruno Ben Moubamba	Independent	1,896	0.53
Raymond Ndong Sima	Independent	1,510	0.42
Pierre Claver Maganga Moussavou	Social Democratic Party	1,130	0.32
Paul Mba Abessole	National Woodcutters' Rally – Rally for Gabon	761	0.21
Gérard Ella Nguema	Independent	583	0.16
Augustin Moussavou King	Gabonese Socialist Party	553	0.15
Dieudonné Minlama Mintogo	Independent	393	0.11
Abel Mbombe Nzoudou	Independent	214	0.06
Total		356,890	100.00
Valid votes		356,890	95.60
Invalid/blank votes		16,420	4.40
Total votes		373,310	100.00
Registered voters/turnout		627,805	59.46
Source: Interior Ministry, Interior Ministry

=== By province ===
Province				
Province	Ali Bongo Ondimba PDG		Jean Ping UFC	
Province	Votes	%	Votes	%
Estuaire	44,064	37.33	71,868	60.88
Haut-Ogooué	68,064	95.46	3,071	4.31
Moyen-Ogooué	4,689	30.51	10,247	66.68
Ngounié	14,173	41.76	18,248	53.76
Nyanga	6,135	44.07	7,250	52.08
Ogooué-Ivindo	12,131	65.96	5,977	32.5
Ogooué-Lolo	9,713	53.25	8,193	44.65
Ogooué-Maritime	7,983	29.67	18,363	68.26
Woleu-Ntem	8,818	24.81	25,914	72.9
Overseas	1,952	37.38	3,047	58.35
Sources: Interior Ministry

== International reactions ==
=== International ===
- European Union – The European Union (EU) observer mission condemned the violence and reported various anomalies in the election process. The EU observers noted an anomaly in voter turnout in various areas, stating that it was unnaturally high. The EU requested that the government make the results more transparent and release results from each polling station.
- France – Prime Minister Manuel Valls said a public recount of the vote should be held to verify the original results. France also showed concern for its citizens living in Gabon based on the numerous arrests conducted in the country.
- African Union – The African Union (AU) condemned the violence in the country and committed to send a delegation to mediate the post election violence with high-level members led by Chad president Idriss Déby.
- United Nations – Ban Ki-moon deplored the violence and loss of life during the protests and requested both parties reduce inflammatory messages against each other and find a peaceful solution to end the violence.
- United States – Washington remained concerned with the way mass arrests were conducted in the country and supported the high-level AU mediation team.

== Aftermath ==
Following the announcement of official results, protests broke out in Libreville on 31 August, with attempts made to storm the election commission's offices. Police were out in force and tried to disperse the protesters. The Parliament building was set on fire later in the day. The following day, Ping claimed that the presidential guard had bombed his party's headquarters, killing two people. By 2 September at least five people had been killed in the capital and 1,000 more has been arrested. The United Nations expressed "deep concern" about the violence. Along with France and the United States, it called for de-escalation on both sides of the dispute and pressed for more transparent detail on the vote outcome.

Although he had previously criticized the Constitutional Court for allegedly favoring the government, Ping appealed the results to the Court on 8 September, hoping to force a recount in Haut-Ogooue Province. Ping warned on 9 September that if the Court did not rule in favor of a recount, "profound and sustained instability" could follow.

The Constitutional Court announced its ruling—anxiously awaited by a public mindful of the prospect of further violence—at around midnight on the night of 23–24 September, upholding Bongo's victory. The Court annulled votes cast at 21 Libreville polling stations, while lowering Bongo's disputed score in Haut-Ogooue to 83.2% (on a 98% turnout). In the modified final results, Bongo's overall score increased slightly to 50.66%. The Court noted that it was impossible to physically recount the individual votes because they had already been destroyed. It also dismissed a request for Ping to be barred from running for President for 10 years for allegedly inciting his supporters to violence in the wake of the announcement of results.

Bongo promptly called for the opposition to participate in a dialogue. Anticipating possible violence, security forces were deployed to key points around Libreville, but the city reportedly remained calm on 24 September. On the same day, Ping branded the Court's ruling as "unjust" and vowed that "we will ensure the choice of the Gabonese people is respected." Meanwhile, Bongo said in an interview that he hoped to form an inclusive government that could include opposition leaders. He also said that the involvement of the international community in mediating the dispute was not necessary: "Among Gabonese, we know how to talk to each other."

Bongo was sworn in for another term as President on 27 September 2016. He appointed Emmanuel Issoze Ngondet, a diplomat who previously served as Minister of Foreign Affairs, as Prime Minister on 28 September. Ping said on 29 September that he would hold an "inclusive national dialogue ... to put in place the foundations of a new republic" and called for international sanctions to be imposed on those responsible for allegedly rigging the election.

A new government headed by Issoze Ngondet was appointed on 2 October 2016. Despite Bongo's earlier statements about forming an inclusive government, representatives of the opposition were largely absent; although Bruno Ben Moubamba, who placed a distant third in the election, was appointed as Deputy Prime Minister, no one associated with Jean Ping was included in the 40-member government. Ping's supporters ridiculed the claims that the government would be "inclusive", while observers noted the lack of any meaningful opposition participation.
