= Léon Mbou Yembi =

Gabonese politician (1946–2019)

Léon Mbou Yembi (15 January 1946 – 3 August 2019) was a Gabonese politician. He was the President of the African Forum for Reconstruction (FAR), a small, radical opposition party, and served as a Deputy in the National Assembly of Gabon from 2006 to 2011.

== Early life and education ==
A member of the Vungu ethnic group, Mbou Yembi was born at Ilendo, near Mouila, and received his higher education in France.

== Political career ==
Following the introduction of multiparty politics at the beginning of the 1990s, Mbou Yembi was elected to the National Assembly in the 1990 parliamentary election. He was the leader of the Gabonese Socialist Party, which joined with two other parties to create the FAR in early 1992. As a candidate in the December 1993 presidential election, he officially placed eighth with 1.83% of the vote.

In April 2005, Mbou Yembi expressed his hope that the opposition could agree on a single candidate to face President Omar Bongo in the November 2005 presidential election. He also said that there should be no campaigning prior to the start of the official campaign period late in the year and that it was important to ensure that the election would be fair and transparent before campaigning began. As a representative of the opposition, Mbou Yembi was included on the joint majority–opposition commission on the reform of the electoral process, which began its work in May 2006 and included 12 representatives from the Presidential Majority as well as 12 from the opposition.

Mbou Yembi was elected to the National Assembly as the Deputy from Mougalaba Department, located in Ngounié Province, in the December 2006 parliamentary election; he was the only FAR candidate to win a seat in the election. In the National Assembly, he became Vice-President of the Group of the Forces of Change (GFC), a parliamentary group that also includes deputies from the Gabonese Union for Democracy and Development (UGDD) and the Congress for Democracy and Justice (CDJ). Later he left that position, although he remained a member of the GFC Parliamentary Group.

Mbou Yembi opposed the planned privatization of Gabon Telecom, saying in June 2007 that it was "an affront to national sovereignty". He applauded the government's decision to abolish the death penalty in September 2007, although he urged the government to also put the matter before the National Assembly. In December 2007, he sharply criticized the government, saying that it had failed because large amounts of money had been spent on health and roads without achieving sufficient results. He said that the appointment of the next government should not merely involve a game of "musical chairs", in which the same old ministers were shuffled to different portfolios, arguing that a real change in the composition of the government was necessary.

Following the death of President Bongo in June 2009, Mbou Yembi announced on 16 July that his party would rally behind a single candidate of the opposition in the 30 August 2009 presidential election. He said that tribalism, regionalism, and ethnicity should not be factors in the selection of the joint opposition candidate.

In November 2009, Mbou Yembi expressed opposition to the implementation of a law making public service incompatible with holding a leading position in a political party. He stressed that parties needed to be led by people who were properly informed about political issues. Along with various defeated opposition candidates and political parties, the FAR joined a coalition, the Coalition of Groups and Political Parties for Change (Coalition des groupes et partis politiques pour l'alternance, CGPPA), which was announced on 15 November 2009.
