= African Forum for Reconstruction =

Political party in Gabon

- President: Léon Mbou Yembi
- Founded: 1992
- Merger of: PSG; MORENA; USG
- Ideology: Socialism
- Political position: Left-wing

The African Forum for Reconstruction (French: Forum Africain pour la Réconstruction, FAR) is a political party in Gabon led by Léon Mbou Yembi.

== History ==
The party was established in 1992 as a merger of the Gabonese Socialist Party (PSG), the Gabonese Socialist Union (USG) and MORENA–Original, which between them had won eleven seats in the 1990 parliamentary elections.

Léon Mbou Yembi was nominated as the party's candidate for the 1993 presidential elections, finishing eighth in a field of 13 candidates with 1.8% of the vote.

The 1996 parliamentary elections saw the USG run alone, whilst the FAR won a single seat. It lost its seat in the 2001 elections, but regained it in the 2006 elections, with Mbou Yembi winning a seat. The FAR did not contest the 2005 presidential elections, although the PSG's Augustin Moussavou King ran, finishing fourth out of the five candidates with 0.3% of the vote. The party only nominated a single candidate for the 2011 elections, in which it lost its seat.
