= Movement for National Renewal =

Movement for National Renewal may refer to a number of political parties:

- Movement for National Renewal (Gabon)
- Telem (political party)
