= Gabonese Socialist Union =

Political party in Gabon

Gabonese Socialist Union Union socialiste gabonaise
- First Secretary: Guy Nang Békalé
- Founder: Serge Mba Békalé
- Ideology: Socialism
- Political position: Left-wing
- National affiliation: African Forum for Reconstruction

The Gabonese Socialist Union (French: Union socialiste gabonaise, abbreviated USG) is a political party in Gabon. Initially an opposition party founded by formerly exiled student activists, the party aligned itself with the ruling majority.

== History ==
Serge Mba Békalé was the founding president of the party. The majority of the founders of USG had belonged to the General Association of Gabonese Students (Association générale des étudiants gabonais, AGEG) in France. Prominent members of the party included Marguérite Makaga, Vincent Essono Mengue, Alfred Antchouet Wora, Mouanga Mbadinga, Marc-Louis Ropivia and Hervé Ossamane Onouviet.

The USG won four seats in the 1990 legislative elections, although it lost a seat in the by-elections held in March 1991. The party joined the coalition government formed in June 1991.

In February 1992 USG united with two other parties, MORENA–Original and the Gabonese Socialist Party, to form an alliance called the African Forum for Reconstruction (FAR). In July 1992 FAR led protests against the proposed Electoral Code. Originally a vocal opposition party, USG soon joined the presidential majority, which caused various splits in the party. In November 1993 USG declared its support for candidacy of incumbent President Omar Bongo in the upcoming elections.

The USG won two seats in the 1996 legislative elections, but lost both in the 2001 elections. The party has not regained parliamentary representation since.

Mba Békalé died in January 2010. After his death Mombo Nzigou provisionally took over the leadership of the party executive committee. In October 2011 USG held its second party congress in Libreville. The congress elected Guy Nang Békalé as the first secretary of the party.
