= Moubamba =

Moubamba is a surname. Notable people with the surname include:

- Bruno Ben Moubamba (born 1967), Gabonese politician
- Cédric Moubamba (born 1979), Gabonese footballer
