= Pacôme Moubelet-Boubeya =

Gabonese politician (born 1963)

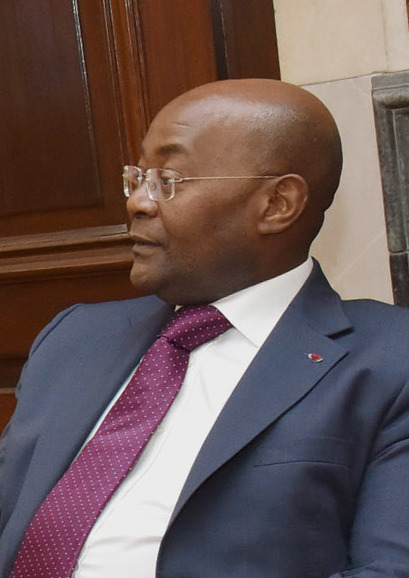

Minister for Foreign Affairs
- In office 23 July 2020 – 8 March 2022
- President: Ali Bongo Ondimba
- Preceded by: Alain Claude Bilie-By-Nze
- Succeeded by: Michael Moussa Adamo
- In office 2 October 2016 – 2017
- Preceded by: Emmanuel Issoze Ngondet
- Succeeded by: Noël Nelson Messone

Minister of the Interior
- In office 2015 – 2 October 2016
- President: Ali Bongo Ondimba
- Succeeded by: Lambert Matha

Personal details
- Born: 12 March 1963 (age 63) Bitam, Gabon
- Party: PDG

Pacôme Moubelet-Boubeya (born 12 March 1963) is a Gabonese politician. He served as the Minister of Foreign Affairs of Gabon from 2020 to 2022, he previously served in the same role from 2016 to 2017. He also was Minister of the Interior from 2015 to 2016.

== Biography ==
He was born in Bitam on 12 March 1963. In 1982, he earned a baccalauréat in Letters and philosophy at the lycée national Léon M'ba in Libreville. Later, he earned an MBA at Ealing College. From 2012 to 2015 he was Chief of Staff of the President of the Gabonese Democratic Party. He was named Minister of Education in 2015.

As Minister of the Interior, Decentralization, and Public Security, he was responsible for explaining the rules of the 2016 presidential election to foreign observers. On 30 August 2016 he said of the presidential election, "any alleged result broadcast before, during or after the official proclamation is a lie and violation of the law." At the time of the post-election protests, he condemned the violence and accused Jean Ping and other opposition leaders of orchestrating it. Moubelet-Boubeya said that the city hall in Libreville was set on fire and some homes were looted. He also claimed that the rioters had used grenades and were armed with AK-47 rifles, a claim denied by the opposition. He said at least 1,000 people were arrested.

After Bongo was sworn in for another term, he appointed Emmanuel Issoze Ngondet as Prime Minister; Moubelet Boubeya was in turn appointed to succeed Issoze Ngondet as Minister of State for Foreign Affairs, La Francophonie, Regional Integration, and Gabonese Abroad on 2 October 2016. He once again became Foreign Minister on 23 July 2020.

== See also ==
- List of foreign ministers in 2017
- List of current foreign ministers
