= Henri-Claude Oyima =

Gabonese politician

Vice President of the Government
- Interim
- In office 14 November 2025 – 1 January 2026
- President: Brice Oligui Nguema
- Preceded by: Alexandre Barro Chambrier
- Succeeded by: Hermann Immongault

Henri-Claude Oyima is a Gabonese politician served as interim vice president of the government of Gabon from 14 November 2025 to 1 January 2026.
