= Movement for National Rectification =

Political party in Gabon

The Movement for National Rectification (French: Mouvement de Redressement National, MORENA) is a political party in Gabon.

== History ==
MORENA was established in 1981, and was forced to operate illicitly in Gabon as the country was a one-party state at the time. It declared itself a government-in-exile and was supported by the Socialist Party in France. Its leaders in Gabon were arrested in 1981 and 1982 for handing out leaflets calling for the restoration of multi-party democracy. Although they were given long jail sentences, they were released in 1986 during a general amnesty.

By the early 1990s, several breakaway factions had been formed, including MORENA–Woodcutters (later renamed National Woodcutters' Rally) and MORENA–Unionist; the original party went under the name MORENA–Original. It won seven seats in the 1990 parliamentary elections, whilst the Woodcutters faction won 20. In 1992 the party merged with the Gabonese Socialist Party and Gabonese Socialist Union to form the African Forum for Reconstruction. However, all three parties later operated independently, and MORENA–Original won just one seat in the 1996 parliamentary elections.

Prior to the 1998 presidential elections the party joined the High Council of the Resistance, an alliance that supported the candidacy of Pierre Mamboundou of the Union of the Gabonese People. He finished second in the elections with 16.5% of the vote.

In the 2009 presidential elections the party nominated Luc Bengono Nsi as its candidate. He received 250 votes (0.07%). The party nominated two candidates for the 2011 parliamentary elections, but failed to win a seat.

== See also ==
- Category:Movement for National Rectification politicians
