= Yrondu Musavu-King =

Gabonese footballer (1992–2026)

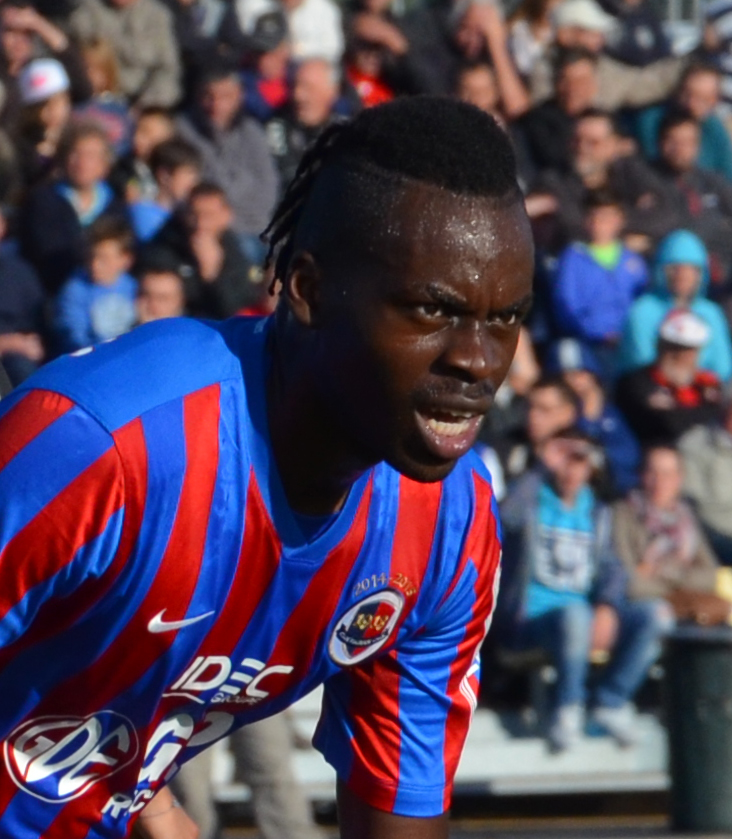
- Musavu-King in action for Caen in 2014

Personal information
- Date of birth: 8 January 1992
- Place of birth: Libreville, Gabon
- Date of death: 5 June 2026 (aged 34)
- Height: 1.86 m (6 ft 1 in)
- Position: Centre-back

Youth career
- 1999–2003: SC Hérouville
- 2003–2007: USON Mondeville
- 2007–2012: Caen

Senior career*
| Years | Team | Apps | (Gls) |
| 2010–2015 | Caen II | 43 | (1) |
| 2012–2015 | Caen | 11 | (1) |
| 2013–2014 | → Uzès Pont du Gard (loan) | 19 | (0) |
| 2015–2016 | Granada | 0 | (0) |
| 2016 | → Lorient (loan) | 3 | (0) |
| 2016–2018 | Udinese | 0 | (0) |
| 2016–2017 | → Toulouse (loan) | 3 | (0) |
| 2017–2018 | → St. Gallen (loan) | 15 | (1) |
| 2019 | Boulogne | 11 | (0) |
| 2019–2020 | Le Mans | 11 | (0) |
| 2021–2022 | Bengaluru | 6 | (0) |

International career
| 2013–2019 | Gabon | 15 | (0) |
- * Club domestic league appearances and goals

Yrondu Musavu-King (8 January 1992 – 5 June 2026) was a Gabonese professional footballer who played as a centre-back. He was the son of Gabonese politician Augustin Moussavou King.

== Club career ==
Born in Libreville, Musavu-King moved to France in 1994, aged only two. In 2007, he joined Caen's youth setup, after representing SC Hérouville and USON Mondeville.

After already playing for the reserve team, Musavu-King made his first team debut on 17 November 2012, starting in a 3–1 away win against US Breteuil, for the season's Coupe de France. Six days later he made his Ligue 2 debut, playing the full 90 minutes in a 1–0 home success over Angers.

On 1 July 2013, Musavu-King renewed his contract for a further two seasons, until 2015, and was loaned to Uzès Pont du Gard on 30 August. After returning from loan in the 2014 summer, he was included in the main squad in Ligue 1.

Musavu-King made his top level debut on 28 September 2014, starting in a 0–0 away draw against Lens. He scored his first professional goal on 4 October in a 2–1 home loss against Marseille.

On 2 July 2015, Musavu-King signed a five-year deal with La Liga side Granada.

On 28 January 2016, Musavu-King was loaned to Ligue 1 side Lorient until the end of the season.

In July 2016, Musavu-King joined Italian club Udinese on a free transfer.. On 31 August 2016, he was loaned to French club Toulouse for the season.

On 5 August 2017, Musavu-King was announced at St. Gallen on a one-year loan.

In January 2019, he signed for French third-tier club Boulogne on a six-month deal with the option of a further year, and joined Le Mans of Ligue 2 in August 2019. He left at the end of the 2019–20 season after Le Mans were relegated.

On 10 March 2021, Musavu-King joined Indian Super League side Bengaluru FC. On 3 July 2021, he extended his contract for two more years keeping him at the club until 2023. He debuted for the club on 15 August in a 1–0 win over Maldivian side Club Eagles in the 2021 AFC Cup qualifying play-offs. He later played in all three group stage matches against ATK Mohun Bagan, Bashundhara Kings and Maziya S&RC. He made his ISL debut on 20 November against NorthEast United FC in a 4–2 win.

== International career ==
Musavu-King made his debut for the Gabon national team on 23 March 2013, starting in a 1–0 2014 World Cup qualifier loss against Congo.

== Death ==
Musavu-King died in Libreville on 5 June 2026, with reports saying that he had been found lifeless outside a property. He was 34.
