= 2009 Gabonese protests =

- Part of Aftermath of the 2009 Gabonese presidential election
- Date: September 3, 2009 - September 5, 2009
- Location: Gabon
- Type: Demonstrations, General strikes, Riots
- Cause: 2009 Gabonese presidential election results
- Organised by: Civilians and opposition supporters
- Outcome: Recount of electoral votes

The 2009 Gabonese protests was rioting and popular disturbances with immediate unrest and violent opposition-led street demonstrations and growing civil disobedience movement across Port Gentil and Libreville in Gabon after the immediate results of the 2009 Gabonese presidential election was announced. Two were left dead amid the unrest, clashes and fighting between the rival forces. French interference in the actions sparked national outrage, one of the causes if the immediate unrest.

== Background ==
The protests began as an opposition attempt to protest a gay at electoral difficulties, widespread irregularities and corruption in the election campaigns, according to the opposition, gained support of the president Ali Bongo and the votes was forced to be in favour of his own party (he is the son of former president Omar Bongo). The nationwide and widespread social protests and anti-election protests was caused by the results, sparking tensions and violence.

== Protests ==
Security forces fired Tear gas at opposition rallies in Port Gentil, the epicentre of the massive demonstrations against the results of the elections, despite police presence. Thousands of demonstrators set fire to tires and trash boxes, while in Libreville, protesters chanted slogans against the president and the results, and called for fresh elections.

All of its 10,000 citizens were told to stay in lockdown despite the violence, and France ordered troops into the cities. The protests continued for the next two days, with two killed in the battles with police and protesters on 5 September. Prisoners was also released, seeing the invasion of opposition-inmates in prison camps. Large-scale violence (by Riot police) and the mass demonstrations was largely ignored by the government-sponsored media, however, other media outlets did full coverage on the protests.

Protests over the disputed elections resumed on 4-5 September, despite severe lockdown and clashes. Strikes paralysed most of the eastern city of Port Gentil and two were killed in the citywide uprising. The movement called for stronger elections, the cancellation of the vote, recount of the election despite widespread irregularities. Electoral Commission reported widespread fraud during the elections.

== See also ==
- 2016 Gabonese protests
