= Lambert Matha =

Gabonese politician

Minister of Interior and Security
- In office 2 October 2016 – 30 August 2023
- President: Ali Bongo Ondimba
- Preceded by: Pacôme Moubelet-Boubeya
- Succeeded by: Hermann Immongault

Lambert Matha is a Gabonese politician who served as the Minister of Interior and Security from 2 October 2016 until the 2023 Gabonese coup d'état on August 30.
