= Hermann Immongault =

Gabonese politician

Vice President of the Government
- Incumbent
- Assumed office 1 January 2026
- President: Brice Oligui Nguema
- Preceded by: Henri-Claude Oyima (interim)

Minister of Interior and Security
- In office 9 September 2023 – 5 January 2026
- President: Brice Oligui Nguema
- Preceded by: Lambert Matha

Minister for Foreign Affairs
- In office 2023 – 30 August 2023
- President: Ali Bongo Ondimba
- Preceded by: Michael Moussa Adamo
- Succeeded by: Régis Onanga Ndiaye

Hermann Immongault is a Gabonese politician who has served as the Minister of Interior and Security since 9 September 2023. He previously served as the Minister for Foreign Affairs for Ali Bongo in 2023 prior to the coup d'état.
