= Vice President of the Government =

Deputy of the President of Gabon

- Vice-Président du Gouvernement
- Coat of arms of Gabon
- Incumbent; Hermann Immongault since 1 January 2026
- Appointer: President of Gabon
- Precursor: Prime Minister of Gabon (some duties); Deputy Prime Minister
- Formation: 5 May 2025
- First holder: Alexandre Barro Chambrier

The Vice President of the Government (French: Vice-Président du Gouvernement) is a political position in Gabon, which was created on 5 May 2025, it establishment was already planned in October 2024. The President appoints the Vice President of the Government. The first holder of the office was Alexandre Barro Chambrier.

== List of officeholders ==
Political parties

Rally for the Fatherland and Modernity (RPM)
Gabonese Democratic Party (PDG)

Other factions

Independent

Status

Denotes interim vice president of the government

No.	Portrait	Name (Birth–Death)	Term of office			Political party	President(s)
No.	Portrait	Name (Birth–Death)	Took office	Left office	Time in office	Political party	President(s)
1		Alexandre Barro Chambrier (born 1958)	5 May 2025	14 November 2025	193 days	RPM	Brice Oligui Nguema
–		Henri-Claude Oyima (born 1956)	14 November 2025	1 January 2026	48 days	Independent	Brice Oligui Nguema
2		Hermann Immongault (born 1972)	1 January 2026	Incumbent	250 days	PDG	Brice Oligui Nguema

== See also ==
- President of Gabon
- Vice President of Gabon
- Prime Minister of Gabon
