= African Institute of Computer Science =

Intergovernmental school based in Gabon

- Institut Africain d'Informatique
- Abbreviation: IAI
- Formation: January 1971; 55 years ago
- Type: Intergovernmental organization
- Headquarters: Libreville, Gabon
- Region served: Africa
- Official language: French
- Website: iaicameroun.com

The African Institute of Computer Science (IAI; French: Institut Africain d'Informatique) is an intergovernmental school based in Libreville, Gabon.

It was established under the auspices of the Organisation commune africaine et malgache in January 1971, in Fort-Lamy (now N'Djamena, the capital of Chad). Its member states are: Benin, Burkina Faso, Cameroon, the Central African Republic, Ivory Coast, the Republic of the Congo, Gabon, Niger, Senegal, Chad, Togo, and Congo Brazzaville.

Based in Libreville, Gabon, it also has representations in Cameroon, Niger, and Togo.
