= 2016 Gabonese protests =

Protest in Libreville, Gabon

- Part of the aftermath of the 2016 Gabonese presidential election
- Date: 31 August – 1 September 2016
- Location: Libreville, Gabon
- Status: Ended

Lead figures
Ali Bongo Ondimba	Jean Ping

Casualties
- Deaths: 5
- Arrested: 1,100

After the 27 August 2016 presidential election in Gabon, in which President Ali Bongo Ondimba was narrowly re-elected against opposition candidate Jean Ping, armed clashes between supporters of Ping, who claimed victory, and police erupted, resulting in the authorities blocking the internet in Libreville.

== Events ==
Violence broke out in at least nine of Libreville's neighborhoods when official results were announced on 31 August 2016, showing a narrow victory for President Bongo, and protesters set the national parliament building ablaze. Rioting and violence continued on 1 September. Ping's headquarters were surrounded and bombed by a presidential guard helicopter, killing two people. Gunfire and explosions were heard in the neighborhood of Nkembo. According to a resident, government forces attacked an opposition radio and television station. Some looting was reported. Around 1,100 people were said to have been arrested as security forces fought to suppress the riots. Pacome Moubelet Boubeya, the Minister of the Interior, condemned the violence and accused Ping and other opposition leaders of orchestrating it; he also claimed that the rioters were armed with AK-47s and grenades, although the opposition denied that. President Bongo labelled the opposition leaders "a small group whose only aim is to take power for themselves."

On 31 August, the major telecom companies in Gabon cut off Internet access.

Also, on 1 September, Jean Ping again claimed to have won the election and declared that "the only solution is that Bongo recognizes defeat". He said he would not bother appealing to the Constitutional Court because it was "a tool of the governing authority" that merely followed orders; instead, he appealed to the international community to intervene in the face of the government crackdown. Dismissing calls to publish the results for each polling station, the government said that could only be done if the opposition followed the legal process and appealed to the Constitutional Court.

By 2 September, life in Libreville appeared to be beginning to return to normal, although there was a heavy presence of security forces maintaining order. Meanwhile, Ping held a press conference and declared himself to be President. He called for a general strike to begin on 5 September: "I ask you from today onward not to use violence but to resist by blocking the country's economy". Nevertheless, business in Libreville was reported to be proceeding relatively normally. Internet access was restored though sources claim it is barely stable and hardly operates. Also on 5 September, Séraphin Moundounga, the Second Deputy Prime Minister for Justice, resigned to protest the government's unwillingness to conduct a recount, which he argued was leading to violence.

Despite his previous criticism of the Constitutional Court, Ping appealed the results to the Court on 8 September, hoping to force a recount in Haut-Ogooue Province. Ping warned on 9 September that if the Court did not rule in favor of a recount, "profound and sustained instability" could follow.

Following the election, the government planned to hold an "inclusive political dialogue" to help resolve the ongoing discord. While about 50 political parties and 1,200 organizations were expected to attend the dialogue, Jean Ping and his supporters, gathered together in the Coalition for the New Republic, refused to participate. The dialogue was scheduled to begin on 28 March 2017.

== Reactions ==
- Algeria evacuated its nationals working in an oil-field in Gabon.

== See also ==
- Gabonese presidential election, 2016
- Gabonese legislative election, 2016
- 2009 Gabonese protests
