= Augustin Moussavou King =

Gabonese politician

Augustin Moussavou King (born 12 October 1959) is a Gabonese politician and the President of the Gabonese Socialist Party (PSG).

Running as the PSG candidate in the presidential election held on 27 November 2005, he finished fourth out of five candidates, receiving 0.33% of the vote.

As a representative of the opposition, Moussavou King was included on the joint majority–opposition commission on the reform of the electoral process, which began its work in May 2006 and included 12 representatives from the Presidential Majority as well as 12 from the opposition.

Moussavou King and PSG chose to support opposition candidate Pierre Mamboundou in the 30 August 2009 presidential election. On 22 July 2009, he called for a one-week extension in the voter enrollment process to facilitate full enrollment of everyone who wanted to vote, arguing that the 24-hour extension that had already been granted was insufficient.

He is the father of Yrondu Musavu-King, a french-gabonese professional football player (1992-2026).
