= Bruno Ben Moubamba =

Gabonese politician (born 1967)

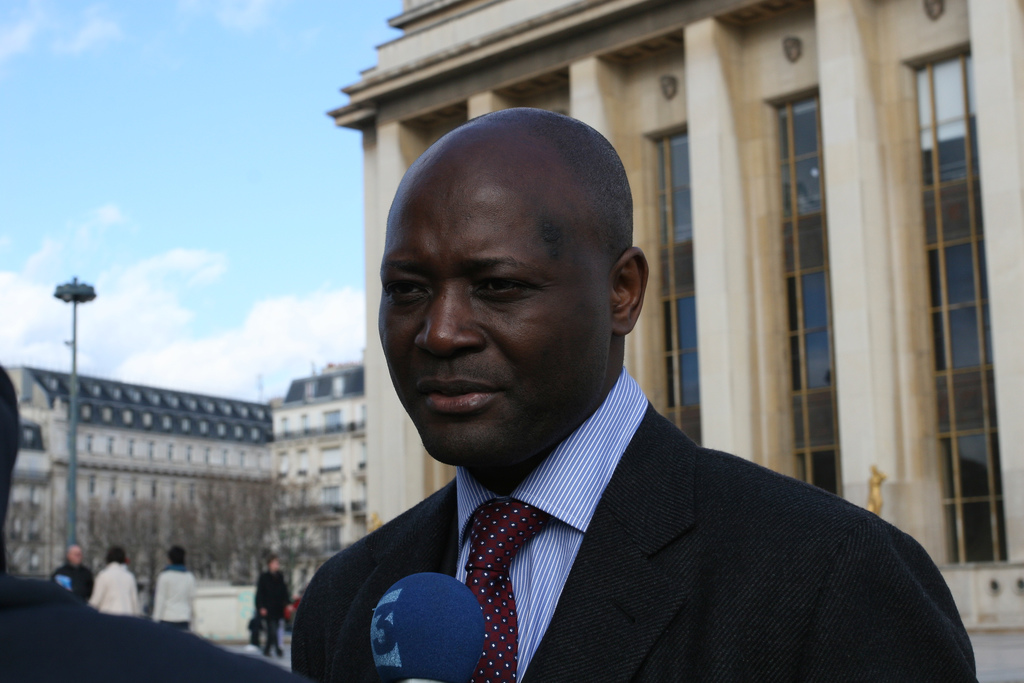
Bruno Ben Moubamba

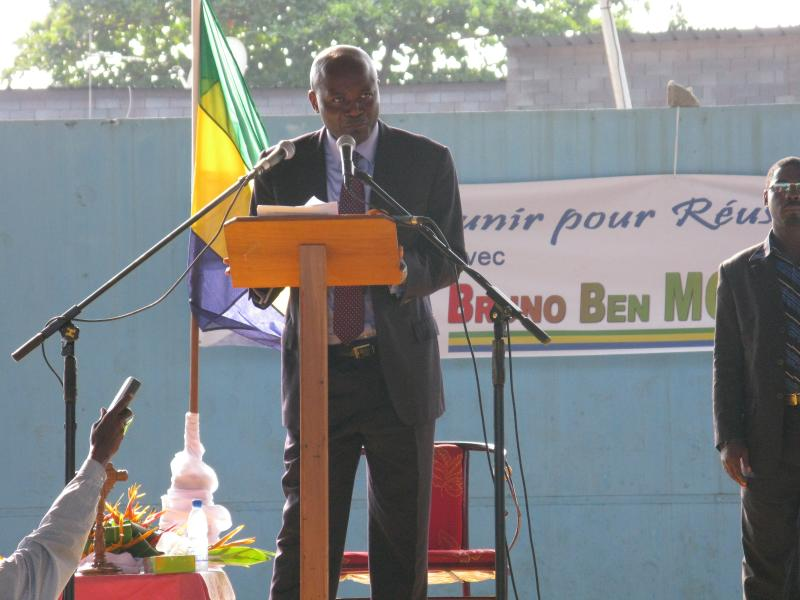
Moubamba declared his presidential candidacy on 25 July 2009

Bruno Ben Moubamba (born 1967) is a Gabonese politician. As an opposition leader, he stood as a candidate in the 2009 and 2016 presidential elections in Gabon. He served in the government as Minister of Housing from 2016 to 2017.

== Early life ==
Ben Moubamba was born in Libreville to the cook of the Saint-Jean de Libreville seminary. He was raised within Catholic institutions.

After he graduated from high-school in 1987 in Libreville, he pursued university studies in philosophy, then communication. He is currently finishing his PhD at the Ecole des Hautes Etudes en Sciences Sociales in Paris.

In 1992, he took part in a humanitarian relief mission in Bosnia, after which he started a career in journalism. Once a journalist, Ben Moubamba contributed to the creation of the Sainte-Marie Catholic radio in Libreville, in 1999. Back in France, he worked at Radio Notre-Dame and KTO, a French Catholic television station.

Ben Moubamba is married to Virginie Hubert-Moubamba. They have three children.

== Political career ==
Ben Moubamba stood as an independent candidate in the 30 August 2009 presidential election. He was noted for making intensive use of social media in his campaign.

In a speech in Libreville, he declared that the leaders of the ruling Gabonese Democratic Party (PDG) had committed a "genocide" against their own people and were "repression professionals".

On 29 July, he asked for the election to be suspended and for a new constitution to be drafted, arguing that the current one was "designed for the late Omar Bongo".

Ben Moubamba began a hunger strike in front of the National Assembly in mid-August 2009, demanding the resignation of the government and a delay in the election. On 20 August, officials from the Presidency asked him to stop the hunger strike, but he refused. Moubamba's condition had sufficiently deteriorated by 22 August that he fainted and was involuntarily hospitalized by his campaign workers.

On 30 December 2009, the planned creation of a new, united opposition party was announced, and Ben Moubamba was among the various opposition leaders participating in it. Ben Moubamba joined the Gabonese Union for Democracy and Development (UGDD), an opposition party led by Zacharie Myboto, and the UGDD then merged with two other parties to create a unified opposition party, the National Union. At the party's launch on 10 February 2010, Ben Moubamba was designated as one of its five vice-presidents.

He resigned from the National Union on 15 August 2011 before joining the Union of the Gabonese People (UPG) in January 2012.

In February 2013, the UPG's Executive Secretary appointed Ben Moubamba as responsible for communication, economy, digital economy and relations with the constitutional institutions.

Ben Moubamba stood again as a candidate in the August 2016 presidential election, placing a distant third with about 0.5% of the vote. Following the election, in which Ali Bongo Ondimba was re-elected, Ben Moubamba was appointed as Deputy Prime Minister and Minister of Urban Development and Housing on 3 October 2016. When a new government was formed on 21 August 2017, in the wake of a dialogue between the governing majority and some elements of the opposition, he retained his ministerial portfolio, but with the less prestigious rank of Minister of State. He was dismissed from the government soon afterward, on 7 September 2017, due to his criticism of other members of the government, culminating in a critical post to social media about Prime Minister Emmanuel Issoze Ngondet.
