= Gabonese Socialist Party =

Political party in Gabon

- Founded: 1991
- Ideology: Socialism
- Political position: Left-wing
- National affiliation: African Forum for Reconstruction

The Gabonese Socialist Party (French: Parti Socialiste Gabonais, PSG) is a small political party in Gabon.

== History ==
The party was established in 1991, and merged into the African Forum for Reconstruction the following year.

In 2006 the party's Augustin Moussavou King contested the presidential elections; he finished fourth out of five candidates with 0.33% of the vote. It supported Pierre Mamboundou of the Union of the Gabonese People in the 2009 elections; Mamboundou finished third with 25% of the vote.
