= List of first women lawyers and judges in Africa =

This is a list of the first women lawyer(s) and judge(s) in Africa. It includes the year in which the women were admitted to practice law (in parentheses). Also included are the first women in their country to achieve a certain distinction such as obtaining a law degree.

KEY

- FRA = Overseas region of France
- GBR = British overseas territory of the United Kingdom

== Algeria ==
- Blanche Azoulay (1908): First female lawyer in Algeria (upon being called to the Bar of Algiers)
- Belmihoub Aziz: First female judge in Algeria (c. 1962)
- Nadia Hammadi: First female appointed as a Judge of the High Court of Algeria (c. 1963–1964)
- Fatiha Sahraoui and Meriem Belmihoub-Zerdani (1964): First indigenous female lawyers in Algeria (upon being called to the Bar of Algiers)
- Fafa Sid Lakhdar-Benzerrouki: First female to serve as the President of an Algerian Court (1975). In 2010, she became the first (female) President of the Administrative Court of Algeria. She is also the first female to serve as an international judge of the Arab League Court.
- Ghania Lebied: First female to serve as a member of the Constitutional Council of Algeria (1999)
- Kaddache Ghania: First female appointed as an Attorney General in Algeria (2008)
- Oufia Sidhom: First female to serve as the President of a Bar Association in Algeria (2014)
- Chafika Bensaoula: First Algerian female to serve as a Judge of the African Court on Human and Peoples' Rights (2017)
- Khadija Aoudia: First Franco-Algerian/Maghreb (female) lawyer to serve as a bar association president in France (2021)
- Leïla Aslaoui: First female to serve as President of the Constitutional Council of Algeria (2025)

== Angola ==
- Maria do Carmo Medina (1925-2014) (1948): First female lawyer (1950) and judge (1976) in Angola. In 1980, she became the first female to serve as an appellate court judge in Angola. Medina was also the first (female) Vice President of the then newly created Supreme Court of Angola (1990).
- Ana Maria de Azevedo Chaves: First female lawyer to work for the Public Prosecutor's Office in Angola (1983). In 2002, she and Conceição José de Matos Agostinho Dias were the first females appointed as Judges of the Angolan Court of Auditors.
- Efigénia Mariquinha dos Santos Lima Clemente (1985), Maria Immaculate Lourenço da Conceição Neto (1988), and Luzia Bebiana de Almeida Sebastião (1991): First females appointed as Judges of the Constitutional Court of Angola (2008)
- Exalgina Gambôa: First female to serve as the President of the Angolan Court of Auditors (2018)
- Laurinda Cardoso (b. 1975): First female to serve as the President of the Constitutional Court of Angola (2021)
- Efigénia Mariquinha dos Santos Lima Clemente (1985): First native-born female to serve as the Vice-President of the Supreme Court of Angola (2023)
- Inocencia Pinto: First female to serve as the Deputy Attorney General of Angola (2023)

== Benin ==
- Hélène Aholou Keke (1974): First female lawyer in Benin. She is also the first female to serve as the President of the Benin Bar Association.
- Elisabeth Ekoué Pognon (b. 1937) (c. 1962): First female judge in Benin (1965). She later became the first female to serve as a Judge of the Supreme Court of Benin (c. 1970s). In 1993, she became the first female appointed as a Judge and the President of the Constitutional Court of Benin.
- Victorie Agbanrin-Elisha (b. 1944): First female prosecutor in Benin (1981)
- Clotilde Médégan-Nougbodé: First female to serve as the President of the High Court of Benin (2003)
- Reine Alapini-Gansou (b. 1956) (1986): First Beninise female appointed as a Judge of the International Criminal Court (2017)
- Dandi Gnamou and Ismath Bio Tchané Mamadou: First females to serve as members of the Court of Auditors of Benin (2019). Gnamou served as an Advisor whereas Mamadou was appointed as the court's first (female) President.

== Botswana ==
- Unity Dow (b. 1959) (1983): First female to study law in Botswana and become a judge (upon her appointment to the High Court of Botswana in 1998). She later became the first female to sit on the Constitutional Court of Botswana.
- Daphne Kgalaletso Briscoe and Mphathini Motsemme: First female magistrates in Botswana (c. 1986)
- Memooda Ebrahim-Carstens: First Botswanan female appointed as a Judge of the specialized Industrial Court of Botswana (1994)
- Athaliah Molokomme (b. 1959) (1981): First female Attorney General of Botswana (2005)
- Sanji Mmasenono Monageng (b. 1950): First Motswana female appointed as a Judge of the International Criminal Court (2009–2018). She was also the first (female) Chief Executive Officer of the Law Society of Botswana (established in 1997). In 1989, she became the third female magistrate in Botswana's history.
- Leatile Dambe: First female to serve as a Judge of the Botswana Court of Appeal (2018). She was also the first (female) Directorate of Public Prosecutions (2005).
- Tebogo Tau: First female to serve as the President of the Botswana Court of Appeal (2021)

== Burkina Faso ==
- Kouma Emilienne Caboret (née Ilboudo): First female judge in Burkina Faso (1969; when the country was known as Upper Volta). She was also the first female to serve as the President of the High Judicial Court of Burkina Faso (1989).
- Antoinette Ouédraogo (1984): First female lawyer in Burkina Faso. She later became the first female Bâtonnier of the Burkina Faso Bar Association (2006).
- Ramata Fofana: First female to serve as the President of a Court of Appeals in Burkina Faso (Bobo-Dioulasso Court of Appeal, 1989–1992; Court of Appeal of Ouagadougou, 1999–2001)
- Anne Konaté and Jeanne Somé: First females appointed as members of the Constitutional Council of Burkina Faso (2002)
- Amina Moussou Ouédraogo Traoré: First female appointed as the Vice President of the Supreme Court of Burkina Faso (1992) and Mediator of Burkina Faso (2005)
- Thérèse Traoré: First female to serve as the President of the Court of Cassation of Burkina Faso (2014)
- Ramata Sanfo: First female lawyer to become a notary in Burkina Faso (2016)
- Denise Zaksongo: First Burkinabe (female) lawyer in Italy

== Burundi ==
- Dévote Sabuwanka: First female to serve as a member of the Constitutional Court of Burundi (1992)
- Espérance Musirimu (1995): First female lawyer to register with the Burundi Bar Association
- Elisa Nkerabirori: First Burundian female lawyer to open her own law firm (c. 1998)
- Domitille Barancira and Christine Nzeyimana: First female justices to serve as the President of the Constitutional Court of Burundi (1998–2006 and 2007–2013 respectively)
- Marie Ancilla Ntakaburimvo: First female to serve as the President (Chief Justice) of the Supreme Court of Burundi (2006)
- Aimée Kanyana: First female to serve as the Ombudsman for the Republic of Burundi (2022)
- Rose Nkorerimana: First female Attorney General of Burundi (2025)

== Cameroon ==
- Miriam Weledji (1968): First female lawyer in Cameroon
- Alice Nkom (b. 1945) (1971): First French-speaking female lawyer in Cameroon
- Lucy Gwanmesia: First female to serve as an Advisor to the Supreme Court of Cameroon (1988)
- Florence Rita Arrey (b. 1948): First female justice appointed as the Chief Justice of the Court of Appeal in Cameroon (1990). She was also the first female appointed as the Prosecutor of the Court of First Instance (1974). She became the first female to serve as a Judge of the Supreme Court of Cameroon (2000). In 2018, she became the first female to become a member of the Constitutional Council of Cameroon.
- Justine Aimée Ngounou Tchokonthieu: First female to be appointed as the Attorney General of a Court of Appeal in Cameroon (2010). She later became the first female appointed as the Attorney General of the Special Criminal Court of Cameroon (2015).
- Ntyam Mengue (b. 1954): First Cameroonian (female) to serve as a Judge of the African Court on Human and Peoples' Rights (2016)
- Annie Noëlle Bahounoui Batende: First female to serve as the President of the Special Criminal Court of Cameroon (2020)
- Claire Atangana-Bikouna: First female to serve as the (Interim) President of the Cameroon Bar Association (2020)
- Dongmo Tabontsa Nidelle Jara (2024): First visually impaired female lawyer in Cameroon and Central Africa
- Marie-Claire Nseng-Elang: First female to serve as the Attorney General of the Supreme Court of Cameroon (2025)

== Cape Verde ==
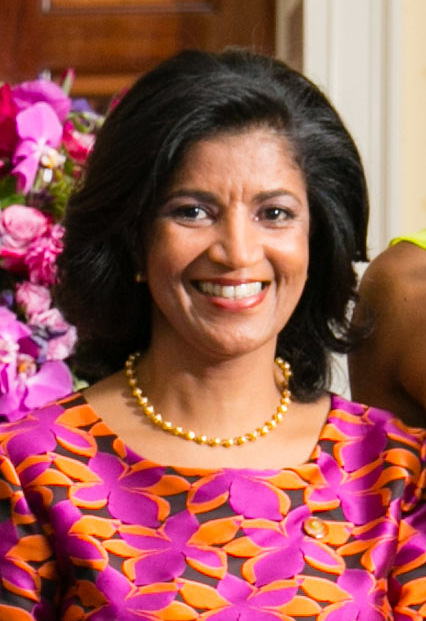
Lígia Lubrino Dias Fonseca: First (female) Bastonária of the Cape Verde Bar Association (2001)

- Evelyse de Melo Monteiro: First female lawyer in Cape Verde
- Vera Duarte (b. 1952): First female to serve as a magistrate in Cape Verde (1977) and Judge of the Supreme Court of Justice of Cape Verde
- Lígia Lubrino Dias Fonseca (b. 1963) (1989): First Bastonária of the Cape Verde Bar Association (Ordem dos Advogados de Cabo Verde) from 2001–2004. She became First Lady of Cape Verde in 2011.
- Maria Teresa Évora: First female to serve as President of the Superior Council of the Judiciary of Cape Verde (2012)
- Maria de Fátima Coronel: First female appointed as the President of the Supreme Court of Justice of Cape Verde (2015)
- Januária Tavares Silva M. Costa: First female to serve as a Substitute Judge of the Constitutional Court of Cape Verde (2015). In 2018, she became the first Cape Verdean female to become a Judge of the ECOWAS Court of Justice.

== Central African Republic ==
- Thérèse Dejean (b. 1946) (c. 1970s): First female magistrate in the Central African Republic
- Danièle Darlan (b. 1952), Clémentine Fanga Napala, Sylvia Pauline Yawet Kengueleoua, and Marie Serra: First females to serve as members of the Constitutional Court of the Central African Republic (2013). In 2017, Darlan became the first female elected President of the Constitutional Court.
- Adelaïde Dembélé and Emmanuelle Ducos: First females appointed as members of the Special Criminal Court of the Central African Republic (2017). In 2018, Ducos was elected as the first (female) Vice-President of the Special Criminal Court.

== Chad ==
- Ngonyam Béradinfar: First female magistrate in Chad (1983)
- Nadingar Ekoue Thérèse (1992), Jacqueline Moudeina (1995), and Delphine Djiraibe (c. 1995): First female lawyers in Chad respectively
- Ruth Yaneko Romba: First female to serve as an Advisor (Councilor) on the Supreme Court of Chad (2000)
- Agnès Ildjima Lokiam: First female to serve as a member of the Constitutional Council of Chad (2002)
- Nadjilem Née Ngaoundi Bombaïto Collette: First female public prosecutor in Chad

== Comoros ==
- Ms. Binti: First female magistrate in Comoros (1967-1968)
- Harimia Ahmed (1988): First female lawyer in Comoros. She later became the first female President of the Moroni Bar.
- Zamzam Ismaël: First female to serve as a public prosecutor in Comoros (upon her appointment to the Fomboni Court of Appeal in 2012)
- Maoulida Djoubeire: First female to serve as the Public Prosecutor (Head) of the Moroni Court of First Instance (2014)

== Democratic Republic of the Congo ==
- Denise Collin (1944): First female lawyer to register with the Bar of Léopoldville (now Kinshasa) in the Belgian Congo [former name of the Democratic Republic of the Congo]
- Guizela "Gisèle" Malanda: First female magistrate in the Democratic Republic of the Congo (1968)
- Theresa Malinda Henriette: First female public prosecutor in Zaire (1985; another former name of the Democratic Republic of the Congo)
- Brigitte Lembwadio (2000): First Black (female from the Democratic Republic of the Congo) lawyer to practice in Switzerland
- Rose Tumba Kaja: First female lawyer to become a Bâtonnier in the Democratic Republic of the Congo (2014) [upon her appointment in the Lubumbashi Bar; Haut-Katanga Province]
- Jeanne Mobele Bomana and Delphine Banza Nsengalenge: First females appointed as Advocate Generals of the Constitutional Court of the Democratic Republic of the Congo (2014)
- Alphonsine Kalume Asengo Cheusi (b. 1955): First female to serve as a Judge of the Constitutional Court of the Democratic Republic of the Congo (2020)
- Marthe Nonde Odio: First female to serve as First President of the Council of State (a federal administrative court) of the Democratic Republic of the Congo (2022)
- Masiala Kaza: First female to serve as an Attorney General at the Constitutional Court of the Democratic Republic of Congo’s Prosecutor’s Office (2023)
- Espérance Dia Akir Akir: First female to serve as the Chief Justice of a Court of Appeal in the Democratic Republic of Congo (2023)

== Djibouti ==
- Khadija Abeba: First female judge in Djibouti (1977). She is also the first female to serve as President of the High Court of Appeal of Djibouti and the Supreme Court of Djibouti (both in 1996).
- Marie-Paule Martinet (1984): First female lawyer in Djibouti
- Korane Ahmed Aouled (1996): First Djiboutian woman to start a legal practice in the private sector in Djibouti
- Fatouma Mahamoud Hassan: First female to serve as the President of the Bar Association of Djibouti (2007). In 2009, she became the first female appointed as a member of the Constitutional Council of Djibouti.
- Ismahan Mahamoud Ibrahim: First female to serve as the First President of the Court of Accounts of Djibouti (2017)
- Lamisse Mohamed Saïd: First female public prosecutor in Djibouti (2020)

== Egypt ==
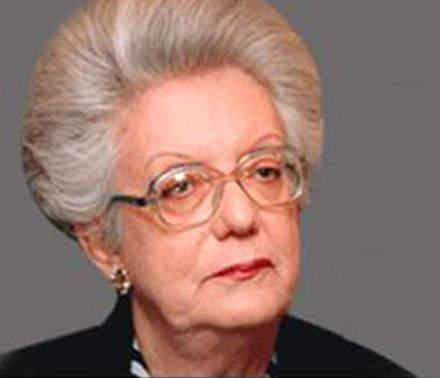
Aisha Rateb: First female law professor and ambassador (1979) in Egypt

- Munira Thabit (1929) and Naima Ilyas al-Ayyubi (1933): First female lawyers in Egypt
- Mufidah Abdul Rahman: First female lawyer to take cases to the Court of Cassation in Egypt, the first woman to practice law in Cairo, Egypt, the first woman to plead a case before a military court in Egypt, and the first woman to plead cases before courts in the south of Egypt
- Aisha Rateb (1949): First female to apply for a judgeship in Egypt in 1949, but she was denied due to her gender. She later became the first female law professor in Egypt (Cairo University).
- Insaf al-Borai: First female judge in the United Arab Republic (1958; a republic signifying the union of Egypt and Syria from 1958 to 1971)
- Tahani al-Gebali: First female judge in Egypt (upon her appointment to the Supreme Constitutional Court of Egypt in 2003)
- Sally al-Saidi: First female appointed as a Judge of the Criminal Court (2009) and the Head of the Court of Cassation of Egypt (2013)
- Dalia al-Namaky: First female appointed as the Chief Judge of the Family Courts in Egypt (2010)
- Namira Negm: First (Egyptian) female to serve as the Legal Counsel for the African Union (2017)
- Hasnaa Shaaban Abdullah: First female judge to preside over a court in Egypt (upon her appointment as the President of the Tanta Economic Court in 2018)
- Fatima Qandil: First female to serve as the President of the Criminal Court of Egypt (2019)
- Fatma El-Razaz: First female Dean of Law in Egypt (2019)
- Mona Ibrahim Mohamed Tawila: First female to serve as the head of a department of the High Court of Appeal of Egypt (2020)
- Radwa Helmi: First female appointed as a Judge and President of the Supreme Administrative Court of Egypt (2022)
- Hind Ahmed Ali Aliwa Amar, Radwa Helmi, and Mona Mahmoud Ahmed Rushdi Mahmoud: First females appointed as Judges at the State Council of Egypt (2024)

== Equatorial Guinea ==
- Ana María Dougan Thomson (1957): First female lawyer in Equatorial Guinea, as well as the first Black female law graduate and lawyer in Spain. She later served as the Dean of the Bar Association of Equatorial Guinea (1990).
- Rosario Mbasogo Kung Nguidang: First (Equatorial Guinean) female to serve as President of the Court of Accounts of CEMAC (2022)

== Eritrea ==
- Fozia Hashim: First female appointed as the Chief Justice of the High Court of Eritrea following the country’s declaration of independence in 1991

== Eswatini ==
- Qinisile Mabuza (1978): First female lawyer and prosecutor in Eswatini (formerly Swaziland). She later became the first female judge in 2005 (upon her appointment as Judge of the High Court of Eswatini).
- Rita Sellstroom: First female magistrate in Eswatini (Swaziland; 1988)
- Mumcy Dlamini: First female to serve as the Acting Director of Public Prosecutions in Eswatini (2006). In 2026, Dlamini became the first female to serve as the Acting Chief Justice of Eswatini.
- Esther Ota: First Black female to serve as a Justice of the Supreme Court of Eswatini (Swaziland; 2012)
- Lorraine Hlophe and Dumsile Faith Dlamini: First females appointed as Judges of the Labour Court of Eswatini (2021)

== Ethiopia ==
- Tewabech Gebremedhin (1946): First female lawyer in Ethiopia
- Alexandra Hamawi: First female to graduate from an Ethiopian law school (1966)
- Atsedeweine Tekle (b. 1952) (1978): First female judge in Ethiopia (upon her serving on the High Court of Ethiopia and Federal Supreme Court of Ethiopia respectively). She also served as a presiding judge of the Supreme Court during the Derg.
- Ashe Nefe: First female to serve as the Vice President of the First Instance Court of Ethiopia (c. 2014)
- Adeneko Svhat-Haimovitch and Esther Tafta-Gerdi: First Ethiopian (female) lawyers elected as judges in Israel (2016)
- Meaza Ashenafi (b. 1964): First female justice appointed as the President of the Federal Supreme Court of Ethiopia (2018)
- Adanech Abebe: First female to serve as the Federal Attorney General of Ethiopia (2020)
- Sinidu Alemu: First (female) President of the Ethiopian Federal Advocates Association (2021)

== Gabon ==
- Marylise Issembé: First female lawyer in Gabon (after having registered in Gabon's Libreville Bar). She was the first female to serve as the Interim President of the National Bar of Gabon.
- Rose Francine Rogombé: First female judge in Gabon (1967). She was also the first female to serve as a deputy prosecutor, investigating judge, Vice-President of the Libreville Tribunal de Grande Instance, public prosecutor and advisor to the judicial chamber of the Supreme Court of Gabon.
- Marie-Madeleine Mborantsuo: First female to serve as the President of the Constitutional Court of Gabon. She and Louise Angué became the first female members of the Constitutional Court in 1991.
- Charlotte Mpaga: First female to serve as the Attorney General of the Court of Auditors of Gabon (c. 2009)
- Sidonie Flore Ouwè: First female public prosecutor in Gabon (2011)
- Julienne Olga Nzamba Massounga: First female to serve as President of the Court of Cassation of Gabon (2020)

== Gambia ==
- Mariam Jack-Denton (1979): First female lawyer in The Gambia. She later became the first female to serve as the President of the Gambia Bar Association.
- Aminatta Lois Runeni N’gum: First female appointed as a Magistrate Class I in The Gambia (1980). She would become the first female Senior Magistrate (1981), Principal Magistrate (1987), and Master of the Supreme Court of the Gambia (1989).
- Mary Sey: First female judge in Gambia (upon her appointment to the High Court of The Gambia in the 1990s)
- Amie Bensouda: First female Solicitor General of the Gambia (1990)
- Hawa Sisay-Sabally: First female Attorney General of the Gambia (1996–1998)
- Esther Awa Ota: First female to serve as the President of the Court of Appeal of The Gambia (2009)
- Fatou Bensouda: First African female (Gambia) to serve as the Prosecutor of the International Criminal Court (2011–2021)
- Mabel Agyemang (Ghana Bar, 1987): First female justice appointed as the Chief Justice of the Supreme Court of the Gambia (2013–2014)
- Fatoumata Sowe and Mariama Jatta: First females appointed as Sharia court judges in The Gambia (2022)

== Ghana ==
- Essi Matilda Forster (1947): First female lawyer in Ghana (then known as Gold Coast)
- Annie Jiagge (1950): First female in Ghana and the Commonwealth of Nations to become a judge (1953). She was also the first female to serve as a Judge of the Court of Appeals of Ghana (1969) and its President (1980).
- Joyce Bamford-Addo (1961): First female Justice of the Supreme Court of Ghana (1991)
- Gloria Akuffo: First female to serve as the Deputy Attorney General of Ghana (2001)
- Akua Kuenyehia: First Ghanaian female to serve as a Judge and the Vice President of the International Criminal Court (2003)
- Felicia Gbesemete: First female to serve as the Vice-President of the Ghana Bar Association (2004)
- Barbara Mensah: First female of Ghanaian descent to serve as a circuit court judge in the United Kingdom (2005)
- Sophia Akuffo: First Ghanaian (female) elected to serve as a Judge of the African Court on Human and Peoples' Rights and its President (2006 and 2012 respectively)
- Georgina Theodora Wood (c. 1970s): First female justice appointed as the Chief Justice of the Supreme Court of Ghana (2007)
- Betty Mould-Iddrisu (c. 1978): First female (a lawyer) to serve as the Attorney General of Ghana (2009–2011)
- Sophia Adinyira: First Ghanaian (female) to serve as a Judge of the United Nations Appeals Tribunal (2009)
- Cynthia Lamptey: First (female) Deputy Special Prosecutor of Ghana (2018) and Acting Special Prosecutor of Ghana (2020)
- Efua Ghartey: First women elected as the President of the Ghana Bar Association (2024)

== Guinea ==
- Charlotte Laurence (1986): First female lawyer in Guinea
- Fatoumata Binta Diallo (1998): First woman who registered to practice law in the Bar of the Republic of Guinea Conakry (Barreau de la République de Guinée)
- Madeleine Thea: First female judge in Guinea
- Aïssatou Toure: First female to serve as the Attorney General of a Court of Appeal in Guinea
- Mariama Souadou Diallo: First female prosecutor of the magistracy of Guinea
- Rouguiatou Barry: First female to serve as a member of the Constitutional Court of Guinea (2015)

== Guinea-Bissau ==
- Maria do Céu Monteiro: First female magistrate and judge in Guinea-Bissau. She was also the first female justice elected as the President of the Supreme Court of Justice and the Superior Council of Guinea-Bissau (2004). In 2014, she became the first Bissau-Guinean (female) to preside over the ECOWAS Court of Justice.
- Aissatu Baldé and Carmelita Djú: First females to serve as Councilors of the Court of Auditors of Guinea-Bissau (2022)

== Ivory Coast ==
- Kwassi Béatrice Cowplli-Boni: First female lawyer in Ivory Coast
- Anne-Marie Gnamessou: First female magistrate in Ivory Coast (1969)
- Mazohin Marguerite: First female judge in Ivory Coast
- Jacqueline Oble: First female law professor in Ivory Coast and sub-Saharan Africa (upon joining the faculty of the Abidjan Law School during the 1980s)
- Martine Tiacoh: First female to serve as a councillor for the Constitutional Council of Ivory Coast (1995–1999)
- Chantal Camara: First female justice appointed as the President of the Court of Cassation of Ivory Coast (2019) and Superior Council of the Judiciary. In 2023, she became the first female President of the Constitutional Council of the Ivory Coast.
- Sori Nayé Henriette: First female to serve as the Attorney General of a Court of Appeal in Ivory Coast (upon her appointment to the Court of Appeal of Abidjan in 2022)
- Florence Loan-Messan: First female to serve as the President (Bâtonnière) of the Order of Lawyers of Ivory Coast (2023)

== Kenya ==
- Katharine Hurst: First female prosecutor in the Kenya Colony (1953)
- Kalpana Rawal (1975): First female lawyer in Kenya (upon her establishment of a law practice in 1975). She later became the first female judge of Asian descent in Kenya (2000).
- Joyce Nuku Khaminwa: First African female to establish a private practice in Kenya (1978)
- Effie Owuor (c. 1960s): First female judge of Kenya (upon her appointment as a Judge of the High Court in 1982). She was also the first female to be appointed as a state counsel (c. 1960s), magistrate (1971), and Judge of the Court of Appeal (2003) in Kenya.
- Roselyn Naliaka Nambuye: First female to serve as a Principal Magistrate in Kenya (1988)
- Mary Ang'awa: First female to serve as the Chief Magistrate of an Anti-Corruption Court in Kenya (1990)
- Raychelle Awuor Omamo: First female to serve as the President of the Law Society of Kenya (2001)
- Abida Ali-Aroni: First Muslim female appointed as a Judge of the High Court in Kenya (2009)
- Joyce Aluoch: First Kenyan (female) to serve as a Judge of the International Criminal Court (2009)
- Nancy Makokha Baraza: First female to serve as the Deputy Chief Justice of the Supreme Court of Kenya (2011)
- Josephine Rotiken (2017): First Maasai female lawyer in Kenya
- Caroline Tegeret (2021): First Ogiek female lawyer in Kenya
- Philomena Mwilu: First female to serve as the Acting Chief Justice of Supreme Court of Kenya (2021)
- Martha Koome: First female to serve as the Chief Justice of the Supreme Court of Kenya (2021)
- Dorcas Agik Oduor: First female to serve as the Attorney General of Kenya (2024)
- Patricia Kameri-Mbote. The first female professor of law in Kenya, and the first female Dean at the School of Law at the University of Nairobi. She is Director of the Law Division of the United Nations Environment Programme.

== Lesotho ==
- Kelello Justina Mafoso-Guni: First female lawyer and Judge of the High Court in Lesotho. She was also the first female to serve on the African Court on Human and Peoples’ Rights (2006).
- 'Neile Alina 'Mantoa Fanana (1980): First woman to hold the post of ombudsman in Lesotho (2010)
- Nthomeng Majara (1997): First female justice appointed as the Chief Justice of Lesotho (2014)
- Hlalefang Motinyane: First female appointed as the Acting Director of Public Prosecutions for Lesotho (2017)

== Liberia ==
- Angie Brooks (1953): First female lawyer in Liberia. She was also the first female to serve as the Assistant Attorney General of Liberia (1953) and a Justice of the Supreme Court of Liberia (1977).
- Emma Shannon Walser (1969): First female judge in Liberia (upon her appointment as a Judge of the Circuit Court of Liberia in 1971)
- Amymusu K. Jones: First female magistrate in Liberia (upon her appointment to the Monrovia City Magisterial Court in 1994). She was also the first female to serve as a Judge of the Fifth Judicial Circuit Court in Grand Cape Mount County, Liberia (c. 2006).
- Frances Johnson-Morris: First female justice appointed as the Chief Justice of the Supreme Court of Liberia (1996–1997). In 2006, she became the first female Attorney General of Liberia (concurrently serving as Minister of Justice).
- Malia Doe: First female juvenile court judge in Liberia (1997)
- Charlene Aimesa Reeves: First female to serve as the Solicitor General for Liberia
- Edwina Edjerah Barchue: First female Public Defender in Liberia
- Charlyne Brumskine: First Liberian female appointed as a Judge of the ECOWAS Court of Justice (2026)

== Libya ==
- Karima El Hadi Turki: First female lawyer in Libya
- Naïma Mohamed Jibril: First female judge in Libya before the law forbade women from holding judicial positions in 1976 (1975)
- Rafia al-Obaidi and Fatima al-Barasi: First female judges in Libya after judicial restrictions were lifted in 1989 (upon their appointment to the Benghazi Court of First Instance in 1989). In 2010, al-Obaidi became the first female advisor in the Supreme Judicial Council of Libya.
- Fatima al-Barasi: First female appointed to the Supreme Judicial Council of Libya (2011)
- Wedad Al-Hamali: First female elected to the Supreme Judicial Council of Libya (2014)

== Madagascar ==
- Berthe Raharijaona: First female lawyer in Madagascar
- Isabelle Razafintsalama: First female public prosecutor in Madagascar
- Emilie Radaody-Ralarosy: First Malagasy female magistrate (c. 1961). She was also the first female appointed as a councilor (judge) of the Supreme Court of Madagascar (1965).
- Arlette Ramaroson: First Malagasy female to serve as an international court judge (upon her appointment to the International Criminal Tribunal for Rwanda in 2001)
- Nelly Rakotobe Ralambondrainy: First female to serve as the First President of the Supreme Court of Madagascar (2007)
- Fanirisoa Ernaivo: First female elected as the President of the Union of Magistrates of Madagascar (2016)
- Annick Tsiazonangoly: First female appointed as a member of the High Court of Justice of Madagascar (2018)
- Chantal Razafinarivo: First female to serve as the Bâtonnier (President) of the Madagascar Bar Association (2019)
- Salohy Norotiana Rakotondrajery Randrianarisoa: First Malagasy female to serve as a Judge of the COMESA Court of Justice (2019)

== Malawi ==
- Vera Chirwa (1959): First female lawyer in Malawi
- Anastasia Msosa (1975): First female appointed as a Judge of the Supreme Court of Appeals (1992–1997), Judge of the High Court (1993–1998), and Chief Justice (2013–2015)
- Chanju Samantha Mwale (c. 2002): First female lawyer (who is a Lieutenant Colonel) in Malawi's army (2004)
- Jane Ansah: First female to serve as the Attorney General of Malawi (2006)
- Tujilane Chizumila: First female Ombudsman in Malawi (2010), as well as the first female to establish a law firm in Malawi. She is also the first Malawian female to serve as a Judge of the African Court on Human and Peoples' Rights (2017).
- Rosemary Kanyuka: First female appointed as the Director of Public Prosecutions in Malawi (2010)
- Tadala Peggy Chinkwezule: First Malawian female to serve as a council member of the Commonwealth Lawyers Association
- Martha Chizuma: First female to serve as the Anti-Corruption Bureau (ACB) Director General in Malawi (2021)

== Mali ==
- Fatoumata Sylla (1982): First female lawyer in Mali. She later became the first female Bâtonnièr of the Bar Association in Mali (1998–2004).
- Kaïta Kayentao Diallo: First female Justice of the Peace in Mali (1985). She is also the first female appointed as the President of the Supreme Court of Mali (2006).
- Amina Mallé Sanogo: First Malian female to serve as a Judge of the Court of Justice of the Economic Community of West African States (2001)
- Fatoumata Dembélé Diarra: First Malian (female) to serve as a Judge of the International Criminal Court (2003)
- Manassa Danioko: First female appointed as the President of the Constitutional Court of Mali (2015). She was also the first female appointed as the Attorney General of Mali (1995).

== Mauritania ==
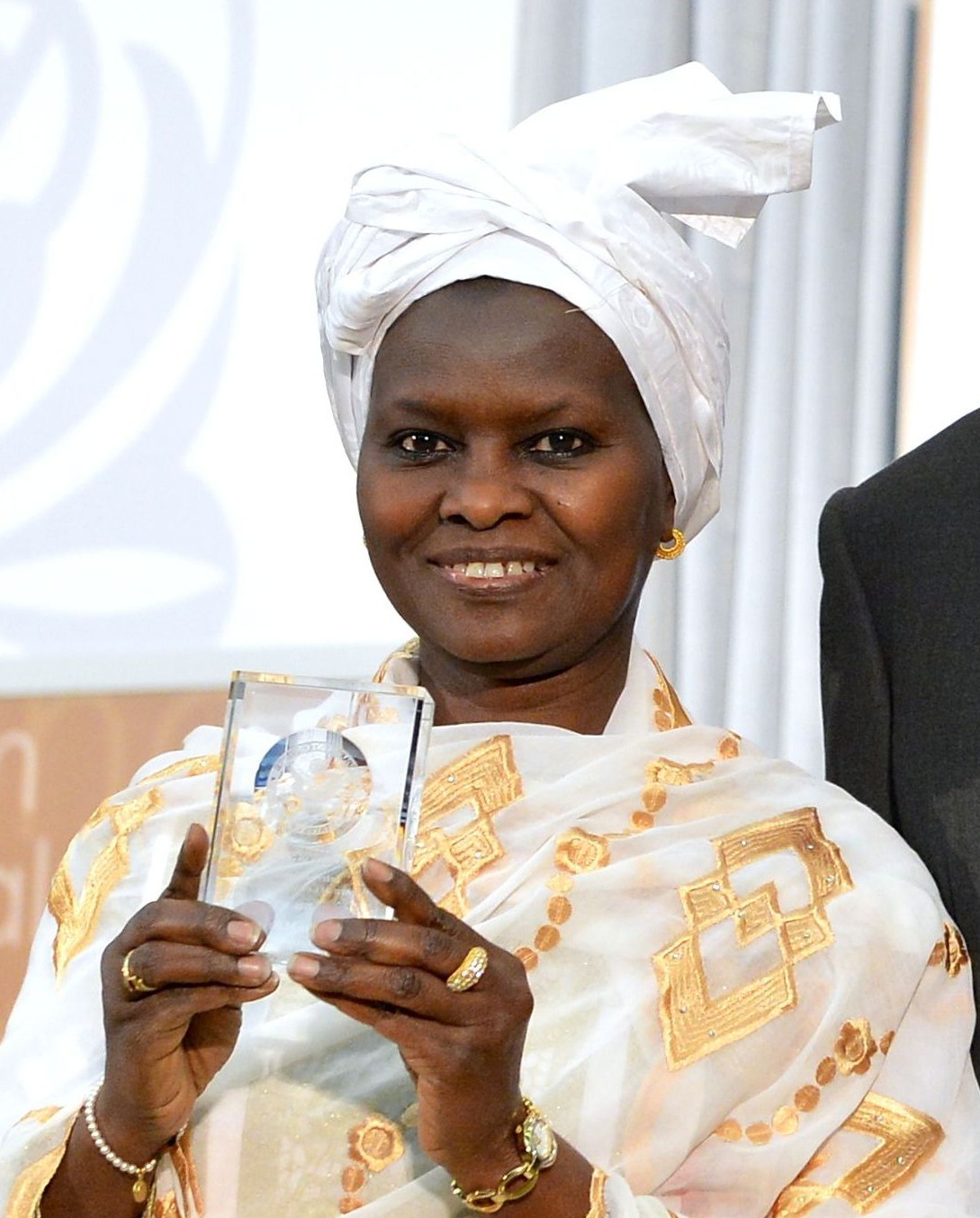
Fatimata M'Baye: First female lawyer in Mauritania (c. 1985)

- Fatimata M'Baye (c. 1985): First female lawyer in Mauritania
- Amamah Bint Cheikh Sidya: First female judge in Mauritania (2013)
- Tekber Mint Oudeika: First female judge to serve as the president of a court in Mauritania (upon her appointment as President of the Labor Court in 2018). In 2015, she became the first female to serve as a Judge of the Commercial Court of the Mauritanian capital.
- Aisha Mint Ahmed (2021): First Haratin female lawyer in Mauritania

== Mauritius ==
- Laure Pillay (1955): First female lawyer in Mauritius. She later became the first female magistrate in Mauritius (1967).
- Saheda Peeroo (1972): First Muslim female lawyer in Mauritius
- Swaleha Mohabeer (1974): First (female) attorney-at-law in Mauritius
- Shirin Aumeeruddy-Cziffra: First female (a lawyer) to become the Attorney General in Mauritius (1982–1983)
- Rookmeenee Narainamah Narayen (a.k.a., Vidya Narayan): First female appointed as a Justice of the Supreme Court of Mauritius (1993)
- Chidambaram Rajalutchemee: First female notary in Mauritius (1993)
- Narghis Bundhun: First female to serve as the President of the Mauritius Bar Association (2000)
- Urmila Boolell: First female lawyer to set up her own legal practice in Mauritius (2008). She and Bundhun were the first women to become Senior Counsels in Mauritius (2016-2017).
- Nalini Matadeen: First female to serve as the Acting Chief Judge of the Supreme Court of Mauritius (2020)
- Rehana Mungly-Gulbul: First female to serve as the Chief Judge of the Supreme Court of Mauritius (2021)
- Nirmala Devat: First female to serve as the Senior Puisne Judge (Deputy Chief Judge) of the Supreme Court of Mauritius (2021)

== Mayotte (FRA) ==
- Fatima Ousseni (c. 1997): First female lawyer in Mayotte
- Gracieuse Lacoste-Etcheverry: First female appointed as the President of the Court of Appeal of Saint-Denis (2015) [jurisdiction over Mayotte and Réunion]
- Christiane Féral-Schuhl: First female to serve as the President of the Conseil National des Barreaux (CNB) in Mayotte (2019)
- Fabienne Atzori: First female to serve as the Attorney General of Reunion and Mayotte (2021)
- Hidaya Daousinka: First female to serve as a justice commissioner in Mayotte (2024)

== Morocco ==
- Hélène Cazès-Benatar (c. 1929): First female lawyer in Morocco
- Zaynab Abd al-Razzaq: First female judge in Morocco (1960)
- Zineb El Adaoui: First female appointed as a Judge (1984) and the Head (2021) of the Court of Auditors of Morocco
- Amina Benchekroun: First female appointed as a Judge of the Supreme Judicial Council of Morocco (1987)
- Saâdia Belmir: First female appointed as a Judge of the Constitutional Council of Morocco (1999)
- Laïla Benjelloun: First female judge to serve as the First President of the Court of Appeal of Commerce of Morocco (2000)
- Zahra Al-Hur: First female family court judge in Morocco
- Najat Arbib: First Moroccan (female) magistrate in Belgium (2009)
- Hajibah al-Bukhari: First female appointed as a Judge of the Supreme Judicial Council of Morocco without a quota (2016)
- Rahmona Ziani: First female appointed as a Crown Prosecutor (or Attorney General) in Morocco (2018)
- Jamila Sedqi: First Moroccan female to serve as a Judge of the Administrative Tribunal of the African Union (AU) (2019) [based in Addis Ababa, Ethiopia]
- Rabiha Fath Al-Nur: First female appointed as the chief prosecutor of a court of first instance in Morocco (2021)
- Hajar Boudraa: First veiled Muslim female judge (of Moroccan descent) in Italy (2023)
- Mina Sougrati: First Moroccan (Arab) female to serve as the President of the International Association of Women Judges (IAWJ; 2025)

== Mozambique ==
- Noémia Neves Anacleto (c. 1953): First female lawyer in Mozambique
- Gita Honwana Welch: First female judge in Mozambique (sometime between 1978–1989). She is also considered the first female academic lawyer in Mozambique.
- Maria Noémia Francisco: First female to serve as a Judge of the Supreme Court of Mozambique (1988)
- Luísa Chadraca (c. 1990): First woman to enroll with the Bar Association of Mozambique (Ordem dos Advogados de Moçambique)
- Beatriz da Consolação Mateus Buchili: First female appointed as the Attorney General of Mozambique (2014)
- Lúcia Fernanda Buinga Maximiano do Amaral and Lúcia da Luz Ribeiro: First females to serve as Judges of the Constitutional Council of Mozambique (2003). Ribeiro later became the first female to serve as the President of the Constitutional Council of Mozambique in 2019.
- Paula da Conceição Machatine Honwana: First Mozambican (female) appointed as a Judge of the Special Residual Court for Sierra Leone (2024)
- Matilde Augusto Monjane Maltez de Almeida: First female to serve as the Vice-President of the Supreme Court of Mozambique (2025)
- Thera Rosalina Joaquim Dai: First female to serve as the Bastonária (President) of the Mozambican Bar Association (2026)

== Namibia ==
- Karen Goldblatt Marshall (1966): First female lawyer (non-native) in Namibia (upon being called to the Bar of Windhoek). She later became the first female judge in Namibia.
- Maria Catharina Greeff (c. 1977): First native-born Caucasian female lawyer in Namibia. She was also the first female conveyance to be admitted in Namibia.
- Bience Gawanas (c. 1993): First native-born Namibian female lawyer in Namibia. She was also the first female appointed as the Head of the Office of the Ombudsman (1996–2003).
- Mavis Gibson: First female appointed as a Judge of the High Court of Namibia (1995)
- Pendukeni Iivula-Ithana (1999): The only female among 21 members of the Namibia Constituent Assembly (1990) and later became the first female Attorney General of Namibia (2001)
- Martha Imalwa: First female appointed as the Prosecutor General of Namibia (2004)
- Elize Angula: First female to serve as President of the Law Society of Namibia (2004)
- Susan Vivier (1983): First female lawyer to obtain Senior Counsel status in Namibia (2010)
- Rita Makarau, Johanna Prinsloo, and Esie Schimming-Chase: First females appointed as Justices of the Supreme Court of Namibia in an acting capacity (2023). In 2025, Schimming-Chase became the first female to become a permanent member of the court.

== Niger ==
- Fatia Amadou Kountché (1979): First female lawyer in Niger
- Fatimata Bazeye Salifou (1979): First female magistrate in Niger (c. 1979). She later became the first female appointed as the President of the Constitutional Court of Niger (2007). She was too the first female appointed Attorney General of the Court of Appeal of Niger (c. 1988) .
- Manou Fassouma Moussa: First female to serve as an Advisor of the Constitutional Court of Niger (2002). She was the first female to serve as Niger's Attorney General of the Court of State (2010; later known as the Niger Court of Cassation). In 2019, she became the first female to serve as the First President of the Niger Court of Cassation.
- Moussa Satou Adamou and Eliane J. Allagbada: First females appointed to the Court of Accounts of Niger (2010). Adamou served as an Advisor whereas Allagbada served as the court's first (female) President.
- Hadiza Moussa Gros: First female to serve as the President of the High Court of Justice of Niger (2011)
- Aissata Zada: First female to serve as the President of the Niger Bar Association (2012)

== Nigeria ==
- Stella Thomas (1935): First female lawyer in Nigeria. She later became the first female magistrate in Nigeria (1943).
- Modupe Omo-Eboh (1952): First female judge in Nigeria (upon her appointment as a Judge of the High Court in Nigeria in 1969)
- Folake Solanke (1962): First female lawyer in Nigeria to become Senior Advocate of Nigeria (1981)
- Victoria Ayodele Uzoamaka Onejeme (1965): First female to become an Attorney General in the history of Nigeria (1978). In 1984, she became the first Igbo female judge in Nigeria.
- Priscilla Kuye: First female to serve as the Interim President of the Nigerian Bar Association (1991)
- Dora Wilson-Ekwo: First female lawyer (who is a Lieutenant Colonel) in the Nigerian Armed Forces (c. 1993)
- Rosaline Omotosho (1961): First female to serve as a chief judge in Nigeria (1995)
- Hauwa Ibrahim (1996): First Muslim female lawyer in Nigeria
- Roseline Ukeje (1971): First female justice appointed as the Chief Judge of the Federal High Court in Nigeria (2001)
- Hansine N. Donli: First Nigerian female to serve as a Judge of the Court of Justice of the Economic Community of West African States (2001)
- Aloma Mariam Mukhtar (1967): First female appointed as a Justice of the Supreme Court of Nigeria and its Chief Justice (2009–2014). She was also the first female lawyer in Northern Nigeria, as well as the first female Judge of the Kano High Court, Nigeria.
- Elsie Nwanwuri Thompson: First Nigerian (female) to serve as a Judge of the African Court on Human and Peoples' Rights (2010)
- Boma Ozobia: First (Nigerian) female to serve as the President of the Commonwealth Lawyers Association (2011)
- Zainab Bulkachuwa: First female judge to serve as the President of the Court of Appeals of Nigeria (2014)
- Justina Obaoye-Ajala: First African (Nigerian female) lawyer to appear before a court in China
- Oyinkansola Badejo-Okusanya: First permanent and elected female President of the Nigerian Bar Association (2026)

== Republic of the Congo ==
- Agathe Pembellot (France Bar; 1969): First female magistrate in the Republic of the Congo (1973), as well as the first female member of the Supreme Court of the Republic of the Congo (1982)
- Julienne Ondziel-Gnelenga (1982): First female lawyer in the Republic of the Congo, as well as the first female to serve as a Bâtonnier
- Delphine Edith Emmanuel Adouki: First female to serve as a member of the Constitutional Court of the Republic of the Congo (2003)
- Yvonne Kimbembe: First female to serve as the Attorney General of the Court of Auditors and Budgetary Discipline of the Republic of the Congo (2009)

== Réunion (FRA) ==
- Marie Colardeau (1930): First female lawyer in Réunion
- Fernande Anilha: First female to serve as the President of the Saint-Denis Bar Association in Réunion (1994)
- Gracieuse Lacoste-Etcheverry: First female appointed as the President of the Court of Appeal of Saint-Denis (2015) [jurisdiction over Mayotte and Réunion]
- Valérie Lebreton: First female to serve as the President of the Tribunal de Grande of Saint-Pierre (2019) [jurisdiction over Réunion]
- Fabienne Atzori: First female to serve as the Attorney General of Reunion and Mayotte (2021)

== Rwanda ==
- Agnès Ntamabyaliro Rutagwera: First female to serve as the Vice-President of a Court of Appeal in Rwanda (upon her appointment to the position for the Nyabisindu Court of Appeal in 1985)
- Agnes Mukabaranga (1994): First woman that registered to practice law in the Rwanda Bar Association
- Odette Murara: First female to serve as the President of a Court of Appeal in Rwanda (upon her appointment to the position for the Kigali Court of Appeal in 1995)
- Immaculée Nyirinkwaya: First female appointed as a Justice of the Supreme Court of Rwanda (1995)
- Navanethem Pillay: First female to serve as a Judge of the International Criminal Tribunal for Rwanda (1995)
- Louise Arbour: First female to serve as the Chief Prosecutor of the International Criminal Tribunal for Rwanda (1996)
- Marie-Josée Mukandamage: First female to serve as a Vice President of the Supreme Court of Rwanda and the President of the Court of Auditors of Rwanda (both in 1999)
- Aloysie Cyanzayire: First female justice elected as the Chief Justice of the Supreme Court of Rwanda (2003). In 2012, she became the first female Chief Ombudsman of Rwanda.
- Anita Mugeni: First female to serve as the Acting President of the Rwanda Bar Association (c. 2015)
- Marie Thérèse Mukamulisa: First Rwandan female to serve as a Judge of the African Court on Human and Peoples' Rights (2016)

== Saint Helena, Ascension and Tristan da Cunha (GBR) ==
See Women in law in the United Kingdom

== São Tomé and Príncipe ==
- Alice Vera Cruz: First female judge and President of the Supreme Court of São Tomé and Príncipe (2001)
- Edite Tenjua: First female lawyer in São Tomé and Príncipe to work in the Oil and Gas Sector (2004). In 2019, she became the first female to serve as the Vice-President of the Constitutional Court of São Tomé and Príncipe.
- Celiza de Deus Lima: First female to serve as the Bastonária of the São Tomé and Príncipe Bar Association (2012–2014)
- Elsa Teixeira Pinto: First female to serve as Attorney General of São Tomé and Príncipe (2013)
- Kótia Solange do Espírito Santos Menezes: First female elected as a Judge of the Constitutional Court of São Tomé and Príncipe (2018)

== Senegal ==
- Suzanne Diop: First female magistrate in Senegal (1964)
- Mame Bassine Niang (1975): First female lawyer in Senegal
- Dior Fall Sow (1968): First female prosecutor in Senegal (1976)
- Marie-José Crespin: First female to serve on the Constitutional Council of Senegal (1992). She is also the first female to serve as the President of the Court of Appeal of Dakar, Senegal.
- Andresia Vaz: First female judge to serve as the First President of the Court of Cassation of Senegal (1997–2001)
- Mireille Ndiaye: First female to serve as the Attorney General of the Court of Cassation of Senegal (2001) and President of the Constitutional Council of Senegal (2002)
- Zeynab Mbengue: First female to serve as a Magistrate of the Court of Accounts of Senegal
- Aminata Gueye (2023): First Senegalese (female) lawyer to practice in Italy

== Seychelles ==
- Danielle Rassool (1975): First female lawyer in Seychelles
- Laure Pillay and Samia Govinden: First female magistrates in Seychelles (2005-2006). Govinden became the first Seychellois female senior magistrate in 2008.
- Dora Zatte: First female to serve as the Ombudsman of the Seychelles (2010)
- Mathilda Twomey (1987): First female judge in Seychelles [upon her appointment to both the Supreme Court of Seychelles (non-resident) and the Seychelles Court of Appeal in 2011]. She is also the first female justice appointed as the Chief Justice of the Supreme Court of Seychelles (2015).
- Fiona Robinson: First female appointed as a resident Justice of the Supreme Court of Seychelles (2013)
- Corrine Rose: First female appointed as the Deputy Attorney General of Seychelles (2026)

== Sierra Leone ==
- Frances Claudia Wright (1943): First female lawyer in Sierra Leone. In 1968, Wright became the first female President of the Sierra Leone Bar Association.
- Agnes Macaulay (1956): First female judge in Sierra Leone (c. 1970)
- Patricia Macaulay: First female appointed as a Justice of the Supreme Court of Sierra Leone
- Agnes Virginia Awoonor-Renner: First female to serve as the Acting Chief Justice of the Supreme Court of Sierra Leone (1984)
- Renate Winter: First female to serve as a Judge of the Special Court for Sierra Leone (2002)
- Umu Hawa Tejan-Jalloh (c. 1970s): First female justice appointed as the Chief Justice of the Supreme Court of Sierra Leone (2008)
- Priscilla Schwartz: First female appointed as the Attorney General in Sierra Leone (2018)
- Eddinia Michaela Swallow: First female to serve as the Vice President and as President for two consecutive terms of the Sierra Leone Bar Association (2020)
- Miatta Maria Samba: First Sierra Leonean (female) to serve as a Judge of the International Criminal Court (2021)

== Somalia ==
- Caasha-Kin Duale (1979): First female lawyer in Somalia
- Samira Hussein Daud and Shamso Bile: Two of the first female prosecutors in Somalia (2015)
- Khadra Hussein Mohammad: First female judge in Somalia
- Zamzam Abib: First Somali female lawyer to open a law practice in Kenya
- Ilham Hassan (2013): First Somali (female) lawyer in Norway
- Lucky Giire: First Somali female lawyer in Australia (2016)

=== Somaliland ===
- Ifrah Aden Omar: First practicing female lawyer in Somaliland
- Khadra Hussein Mohammad: First female lawyer to become the National Deputy Prosecutor in Somaliland (2014)
- Aswan Harmud: First female lawyer to become the Prosecutor of Somaliland (2015)

== South Africa ==
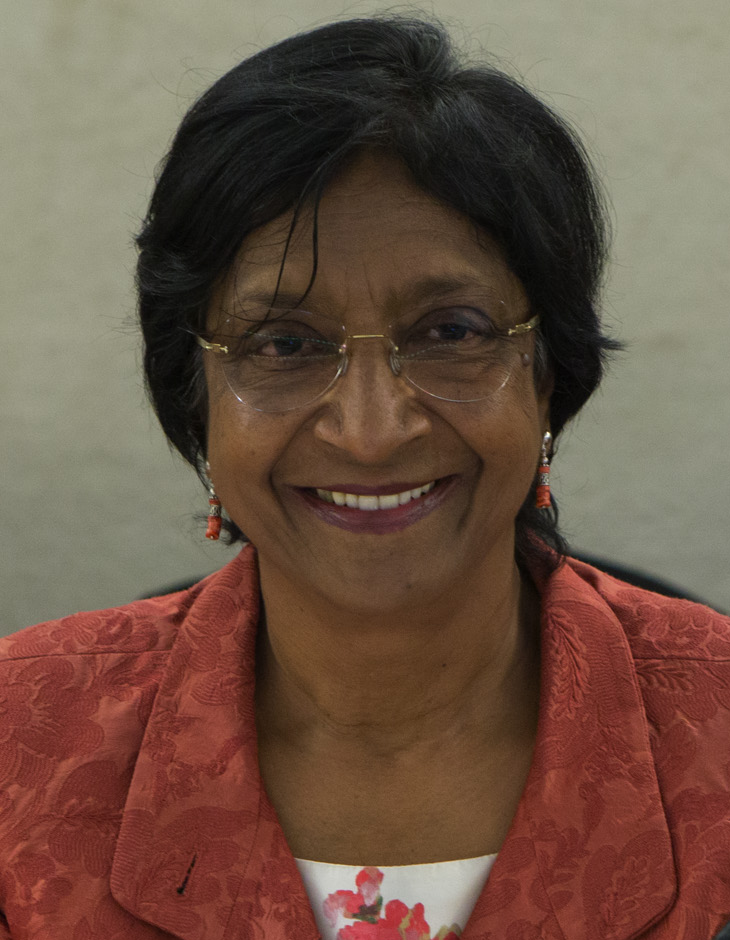
Navanethem Pillay: First Tamil-Indian female appointed as a Judge of the High Court of South Africa (1995)

In 1909, Madeline Wookey began fighting for the right to practice law in South Africa. She lost her case at the appellate level in 1912.

- Frances Lyndall Schreiner: First female law graduate in South Africa (1914)
- Constance Mary Hall (1926): First female lawyer in South Africa
- Gladys Steyn, Irene Antoinette Geffen, and Bertha Solomon (1926): First female advocates in South Africa
- Olga Brink: First female magistrate in South Africa (1962)
- Leonora van den Heever (1952): First female judge in South Africa (1969). She was also the first female to become Senior Counsel in South Africa. In 1991, she became the first female appointed permanently to the appellate division of the Supreme Court of South Africa.
- Navanethem Pillay (1967): First Tamil-Indian female appointed as a Judge of the High Court of South Africa (1995)
- Zainunnisa "Cissie" Gool (1963) and Desiree Finca (1967): First Black female lawyers respectively in South Africa
- Mokgadi Mailula and Yvonne Mokgoro (1987): First Black female judges in South Africa (1994; the latter was appointed to the constitutional court)
- Yvonne Mokgoro (1987) and Kate O'Regan: First females appointed as Justices of the Constitutional Court of South Africa (1994)
- Esmé du Plessis (1965): First female to serve as the president of a law society in South Africa (1995). She was also the first female lawyer qualified as a patent agent in South Africa.
- Lucy Mailula: First Black female appointed as a Judge of the High Court of South Africa (1995)
- Monica Leeuw: First female to serve as the President of a High Court in South Africa (2010)
- Mandisa Maya: First female (and Black female) appointed as President of the Supreme Court of Appeal of South Africa (2017) and Deputy Chief Justice of South Africa (Constitutional Court of South Africa; 2022). In 2024, she became the first (Black) female Chief Justice of South Africa.
- Shamila Batohi: First female to serve as the Director of the National Prosecuting Authority of South Africa (2018)
- Sisi Khampepe: First female to serve as the Acting Chief Justice of the Constitutional Court of South Africa (2019)
- Lebogang Modiba: First female to serve as the President of the Special Tribunal in South Africa (2022)
- Mabaeng Lenyai: First female elected as the President of the Law Society of South Africa (2022)
- Katharine Mary Savage: First South African female to serve as a Judge of the United Nations Appeals Tribunal (2023)

== South Sudan ==
- Salwa Berberi: First female law graduate (c. 1970s) and lawyer in South Sudan
- Ajonye Perpetua: First female judge in South Sudan

== Sudan ==
- Sania Mustafa (c. 1960s): First female lawyer in Sudan
- Ihsan Mohamed Fakhri: First female judge in Sudan (1965). She later became the first female appointed as a Judge of the Supreme Court of Sudan.
- Nagwa Kamal Farid: First female appointed as a Judge of the Shari'a Court in Sudan (1970)
- Nemat Abdullah Khair: First female Chief Justice/President of the Supreme Court of Sudan (2019)
- Intisar Ahmed Abdel-Aal: First female to serve as the Attorney General of Sudan (2025)

== Tanzania ==
- Julie Manning: First female lawyer in Tanzania. She later became the first female judge (upon her appointment as a Judge of the High Court of Tanzania in 1974). Manning is considered the first woman to become a high court judge in East and Central Africa.
- Suad Al-Lamkia: First female lawyer to work for the Tanzanian Public Prosecution (1971-1972)
- Eusebia Munuo: First female to serve as a Justice of the Court of Appeal of Tanzania
- Joaquine De Mello: First female to serve as the President of the Tanganyika Law Society (2007-2008)

=== Zanzibar ===
- Suad bint Mohammed al Lamkiya: First Zanzibari-born female to become a lawyer, though she was unsuccessful in establishing her own legal practice due to the Zanzibar Revolution
- Janet Sekihola: First female appointed as a Primary Court Magistrate in Zanzibar (c. 1980s)
- Salma Ali Hassan Khamis and Mwanamkaa Abdulrahman Mohammed: First females to serve as the Director and Deputy Director respectively of the Office of Public Prosecutions in Zanzibar (2021)

== Togo ==
- Marguerite Adjoavi Trénou (1971) and Loretta Massan Acouetey (1976): First female lawyers respectively in Togo. Trenou was regarded as Togo's first female defense lawyer. In 1998, Acouetey became the first female President (Bâtonnière) of the Togo Order of Lawyers.
- Biyémi Brigitte Brym-Kekeh: First female magistrate in Togo (c. 1960s). She later became the first female to serve as President of the Judicial Chamber of the Supreme Court of Togo.
- Sylvia Aquereburu: First female notary in Togo (1981)
- Awa Nana Daboya: First Togolese female to serve as a Judge of the Court of Justice of the Economic Community of West African States (2001). In 2021, Daboya was appointed as the first (female) Ombudsman of Togo.
- Edwige Ablavi Hohoueto: First female appointed as a Judge of the Constitutional Court of Togo (2007)
- Evelyne Afiwa Hohoeto: First Togolese female elected as a Judge at the Common Court of Justice and Arbitration of the Organization for the Harmonization in Africa of Business Law (2018)
- Madoé Virginie Ahodikpe and Justine Azanlédji-Ahadzi: First females to serve as the Attorney General of the Supreme Court of Togo (appointed in 1997 and 2022 respectively; Ahodikpe may have held her position on a substitute basis)

== Tunisia ==
- Juliette Smaja Zérah (1916): First [Jewish] female to study law (1911) and become a lawyer in Tunisia
- Amna Aouij: First female magistrate in Tunisia (1966)
- Emma Chtioui and Joudeh Jijah: First female judges respectively in Tunisia (1968)
- Leila Khadija Zouari Bel Hassan (1970) and Aïda Ajimi (1973): First Muslim female lawyers in Tunisia
- Suzanne Bastid: First female ad hoc judge of the International Court of Justice for Tunisia (1982)
- Kalthoum Meziou Dourai: First female Dean of Law in Tunisia (1999)
- Rafiâ Ben Ezzedine: First female judge appointed as the President of a Court of Appeal in Tunisia
- Radhia Nasraoui: First female elected head of the Tunisian National Bar Association
- Faouzia Ben Alaya: First female appointed as the President of the Court of Cassation of Tunisia (2016)
- Samira Guiza: First female to serve as the President of the Administrative Court of Tunisia (2026)

== Uganda ==
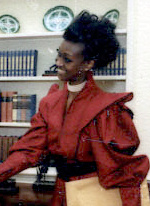
Princess Elizabeth Christobel Edith Bagaaya Akiiki of Toro: First female lawyer in Uganda (1965)

- Princess Elizabeth Christobel Edith Bagaaya Akiiki of Toro (1965): First female lawyer in Uganda
- Laeticia Kikonyogo (1968): First female magistrate in Uganda (upon being appointed to Grade I from 1971 to 1973). She was also the first female Chief Magistrate (1973–1986), Judge of the High Court of Uganda (1986), Justice of the Supreme Court of Uganda (1997) and Deputy Chief Justice of Uganda (2001-2010 after having served as a Judge of the Court of Appeal of Uganda/Constitutional Court of Uganda).
- Rebecca Kadaga: First female lawyer to open a private practice firm in Uganda (c. 1980s)
- Solomy Balungi Bossa: First female to lead the Uganda Law Society (1993) and East African Law Society (1995)
- Sylvia Tamale: First female Dean of Law in Uganda (2004)
- Julia Sebutinde (1978): First Ugandan female appointed as a Judge of the Special Court for Sierra Leone (2005) and a Judge of the International Court of Justice (2012)
- Stella Arach-Amoko: First female to serve as the Head of the Commercial Court of Uganda (2006)
- Florence Ndagire (2009): First female lawyer with visual impairment in Uganda
- Monica Kalyegira Mugenyi: First (Ugandan) female to serve as the Principal Judge of the First Instance Division, East African Court of Justice (2015)
- Jane Frances Abodo: First female to serve as the Director of Public Prosecutions in Uganda (2020)
- Faridah Shamilah Bukirwa and Celia Nagawa: First Muslim females to serve as Judges of the High Court of Uganda (2023)

== Zambia ==
- Jan J. "J. J." McGrowther (c. 1950s): First female barrister admitted to the bars in Northern Rhodesia [former name of Zambia] and Southern Rhodesia [former name of Zimbabwe]
- Lombe P. Chibesakunda (1969): First Zambian female lawyer and first female Solicitor General (1973) in Zambia. She was the first female to serve as Acting Chief Justice of Zambia (2012–2015).
- Florence Mumba (1973): First female judge in Zambia (upon her appointment as a Judge of the High Court of Zambia in 1980). She and Lombe P. Chibesakunda were the first females appointed to the Supreme Court of Zambia in 1998.
- Josephine Nyirongo: First female appointed as a State Counsel in Zambia (2004)
- Irene Mambilima: First female to serve as the Deputy Chief Justice (2008-2015) and Chief Justice of the High Court of Zambia (2015–2021)
- Hildah Chibomba, Mugeni Mulenga, and Anne Sitali: First females to serve as Judges of the Constitutional Court of Zambia (2016). Chibomba was also the first female to serve as President of the Constitutional Court of Zambia.
- Sara Larios (2011): First American female admitted to practice law in Zambia
- Prisca Matimba Nyambe: First Zambian (female) to serve as a Judge of the International Residual Mechanism for Criminal Tribunals (2012)
- Lillian Fulata Shawa: First female to serve as the Director of Public Prosecutions in Zambia (2016)
- Linda Kasonde: First female elected as the President of the Law Society of Zambia (2016)
- Fulgency Mwenya Chisanga, Flavia Malata Chishimba, Judy Zulu-Mulongoti and Catherine Makung: First females to serve as Judges of the Zambia Court of Appeals (2016). Chisanga was also the first (female) President of the Zambia Court of Appeals.
- Abha Nayar Patel: First Indian female to serve as a Justice of the Supreme Court of Zambia (2026)

== Zimbabwe ==
- Phyllis Mackendrick (c. 1928): First female lawyer in Rhodesia (Southern Rhodesia) admitted to the High Court [former name of Zimbabwe]
- Jan J. "J. J." McGrowther (c. 1950s): First female barrister admitted to the bars in Northern Rhodesia [former name of Zambia] and Southern Rhodesia [former name of Zimbabwe]
- Kelello Justina Mafoso-Guni: First female magistrate in Zimbabwe (1980). Later on in her career she became the first female lawyer and Judge of the High Court in Lesotho. She was also the first female to serve on the African Court on Human and Peoples’ Rights (2006).
- Thérèse Striggner Scott: First female appointed as a Judge of the High Court of Zimbabwe (c. 1983)
- Vernanda Ziyambi: First female appointed as a Justice of the Supreme Court of Zimbabwe (2001)
- Antonia Guvava: First (Zimbabwean) female to serve as a member of the SADC Tribunal (2005)
- Rita Makarau: First female appointed as the Judge President of the High Court of Zimbabwe (2006)
- Anne-Marie Gowora, Elizabeth Gwaunza, Antonia Guvava, Rita Makarau and Susan Mavangira: First females to serve as Judges of the Constitutional Court of Zimbabwe (2013)
- Vimbai Nyemba: First female President of the Law Society of Zimbabwe (2015)
- Elizabeth Gwaunza: First female appointed as the Deputy Chief Justice (2018), Acting Chief Justice (2021), and Chief Justice (2026) of the Supreme Court of Zimbabwe. In 2026, she also became the first female President of the Constitutional Court of Zimbabwe.
- Virginia Mabiza: First female to serve as the Attorney-General of Zimbabwe (2023)

== See also ==
- Justice ministry
- List of first women lawyers and judges by nationality
- List of first women lawyers and judges in Asia
- List of first women lawyers and judges in Europe
- List of first women lawyers and judges in North America
- List of first women lawyers and judges in Oceania
- List of first women lawyers and judges in South America
- List of first women lawyers and judges in the United States
- List of the first women holders of political offices in Africa
