= Sangoma (disambiguation) =

A sangoma is a practitioner of traditional medicine.

Sangoma may also refer to:

- Sangoma, Limpopo, a village in South Africa
- Sangoma Technologies Corporation
- Sangoma (Abdullah Ibrahim album), a 1973 recording
- Sangoma, a 1987 EP by Yvonne Chaka Chaka
- Sangoma (Miriam Makeba album), a 1988 recording
