= Fatima Ousseni =

Mahoran lawyer and art collector

Fatima Ousseni is a contemporary art collector, feminist, and first female lawyer in the overseas French territory of Mayotte.

== Biography ==
Fatima Ousseni is considered an inspiration for girls in the Mayotte, a country in which "girls are predestined to marry after two or three years of college". Second female lawyer from Mayotte, Kassurati Mattoir, indicated in an interview that Fatima Ousseni inspired her to pursue the law profession during a project that took place in her school "about the place of women in Mayotte". Kassurati Mattoir later received her JDM as a mentee in the office of Fatima Ousseni.

Fatima Ousseni was a co-organizer of the Mayotte "Contemporary Arts 2016" exhibition.

She is also the organising secretary of the Zangoma Association, which in 2015 organised the "Africa and Science" exhibition to showcase the scientific contributions of the African scientist Cheikh Anta Diop, whose work Fatima Ousseni described as the "first technological revolutions absolutely unknown".

== See also ==
- List of first women lawyers and judges in Africa
