= Aisha Rateb =

Egyptian lawyer, politician and ambassador (1928 – 2013)

- عائشة راتب
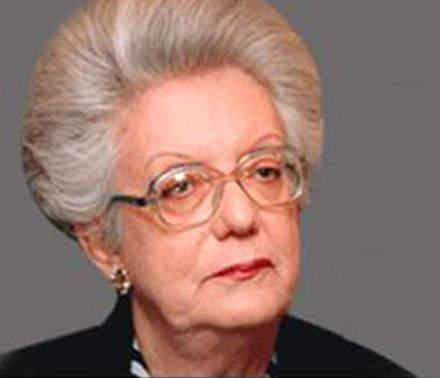

Minister of Social Affairs
- In office 16 November 1971 – 19 March 1976
- President: Anwar Sadat
- Prime Minister: Mahmoud Fawzi; Aziz Sedky; Anwar Sadat; Abdel Aziz Mohamed Hegazy; Mamdouh Salem
- Preceded by: Ahmed El-Sayed Darwish
- Succeeded by: Herself

Minister of Social Affairs and Insurance
- In office 19 March 1976 – 3 February 1977
- President: Anwar Sadat
- Prime Minister: Mamdouh Salem
- Preceded by: Herself (Social Affairs); Mohamed Abdel Fattah Ibrahim (Insurance)
- Succeeded by: Amal Othman

Personal details
- Born: 22 February 1928 Cairo
- Died: 4 May 2013 (aged 85) Giza
- Citizenship: Egypt
- Education: Cairo University
- Occupation: Lawyer and politician
- Known for: First female ambassador of Egypt

Aisha Rateb (Arabic: عائشة راتب; 22 February 1928 – 4 May 2013) was an Egyptian lawyer, politician, and Egypt's first female ambassador. She also was a professor of international law at Cairo University.

== Biography ==
Rateb was born in Cairo to a middle-class, educated family.

== Education ==
When she attended college, she first studied literature at Cairo University, but transferred to law after only a week of studies. Rateb graduated from Cairo University in 1949, went briefly to Paris for further education and then received her PhD in law in 1955.

Rateb applied to become a judge on the Conseil de'Etat (the highest judicial body in Egypt) in 1949, and was rejected because of her gender. The prime minister of the time, Hussein Serry Pasha, said that having a woman judge was "against the traditions of society". She sued the government on the grounds that her constitutional rights were violated. Her lawsuit was the first of its kind in Egypt, and when she lost the case, it was admitted by the head of State Council, Abdel-Razek al-Sanhouri, that she lost only because of political and cultural reasons, not based on Egyptian or sharia law. The lawsuit and the written opinion of al-Sanhouri encouraged other women to follow suit, although none became judges until in 2003, when Tahani al-Gebali was appointed as a judge. In 2010, Egypt's prime minister ordered a review of a recent decision against allowing female judges. In July 2015, 26 women were finally sworn in as judges.

== Political career ==
Rateb was part of the Arab Socialist Union's Central Committee in 1971, where she helped write the new constitution for Egypt. Of all of the committee members, she was the only one who objected to the "extraordinary powers that the Constitution granted to the then president Anwar al-Sadat".

Afterwards, she served as Minister of Insurance and Social Affairs from 1974 to 1977, and was the second woman to hold that position. During her time there she was able to pass reforms for women in the country. Rateb was able to do this even while fundamentalist sheikhs tried to ruin her reputation. Rateb went on to place restrictions on polygamy and ensure that divorce was only legal if it was witnessed by a judge. She also worked to help those in poverty, and passed a law to help employ the disabled. When the government lifted subsidies on essential goods, a move that would affect the poorest citizens in Egypt, she resigned protest in 1977 during the bread uprising.

In 1979, Rateb was appointed as Egypt's first woman ambassador. As an ambassador, she led Egypt on a "balanced position in a world of highly polarised international relations". She was ambassador to Denmark from 1979 to 1981 and to the Federal Republic of Germany from 1981 to 1984.

Rateb was critical of former Egyptian president Hosni Mubarak because she felt that his rule created a greater divide between the rich and poor.

== Death ==
Rateb died in Giza after a sudden cardiac arrest in 2013.

== See also ==
- First women lawyers around the world
