= AMDH =

AMDH may refer to:

- Association Malienne des Droits de l'Homme, a Malian human rights NGO
- Association marocaine des droits humains, a Moroccan human rights NGO
- Association Mauritanienne des Droits de l'Homme, a Mauritanian human rights NGO
- Academia Mexicana de Derechos Humanos, a Mexican human rights NGO
- Associação Mineira de Desenvolvimento Humano, the former name of Betim Futebol, a Brazilian football club
