= Mabuza =

Mabuza is a Nguni surname popular in South Africa and Eswatini. Notable people with the surname include:

- David Mabuza (1960–2025), South African politician
- Enos John Mabuza (1939–1997), South African politician
- Jabulani Mabuza (born 1972), Eswatini politician and businessman
- Kaizer Mabuza (born 1980), South African boxer
- Lady Howard Mabuza, Eswatini politician
- Njabulo Mabuza, Eswatini businessman and politician
- Qinisile Mabuza, Eswatini judge
- Richard Mabuza (1946–2018), Eswatini long-distance runner
- Silence Mabuza (born 1977), South African boxer
- Thabo Mabuza (born 1994), South African rugby player

== See also ==
- Felicia Mabuza-Suttle, South African television personality
