= Kasonde =

Kasonde is a surname. Notable people with the surname include:

- Emmanuel Kasonde (1935–2008), Zambian economist and politician
- Francis Kasonde (born 1986), Zambian football player
- Joseph Kasonde (1938–2017), Zambian politician
- Linda Kasonde (born 1978), Zambian legal practitioner
