= Colardeau =

Colardeau is a surname. Notable people with the surname include:

- Charles-Pierre Colardeau, French poet
- Marie Colardeau, French feminist and lawyer

== See also ==
- Crochat-Colardeau, method of petrol-electric transmission
