= Mavis Gibson =

Zimbabwean lawyer and judge

Judge of the High Court of Zimbabwe

Personal details
- Born: 5 December 1939
- Died: 21 May 2025 (aged 85)

Mavis Gibson (5 December 1939 – 21 May 2025) was a Zimbabwean lawyer and judge who served on the High Court of Zimbabwe and was the first female and longest serving-justice of the High Court of Namibia.

== Early life and education ==
Mavis Gumede was born in Makokoba, a suburb of Bulawayo, Zimbabwe on 5 December 1939. She was the third child of 15 and her father Benjamin Gumede worked as a clerk for the Southern Rhodesia Post Office. She went to St Augustine’s Mission school in Penhalonga and completed her A-levels at Goromonzi High School.

== Career ==
Gibson originally worked as a journalist, including as a Ndebele newscaster for the Rhodesia Broadcasting Services. She then served as a secretary at Rhodesia House in London.

In the 1970s, she was a barrister with chambers in Lincoln's Inn, London.

Justice Gibson broke new ground in 1984 when she was appointed to the Administrative Court on 1 March before being elevated to the High Court on 15 May of the same year, becoming the first woman to sit on the bench in Zimbabwe’s history.

Gibson was appointed to Zimbabwe's Administrative Court on 1 March 1984 and elevated to the High Court on 15 May the same year, the first woman jurist on that court where she served for eleven years. Although some sources identify Gibson as Zimbabwe's first female judge, Kelello Justina Mafoso-Guni holds the distinction of becoming the country's first woman magistrate in 1980.

Gibson was appointed a Judge of Namibia's High Court on 18 December 1995. At times she also served as an Acting Judge of Appeal of the Supreme Court of Namibia. She retired from the court in 2001.

== Personal life and death ==
Gibson was married to Stuart Gibson until his death in 2001.

After Gibson retired, she returned to live in the United Kingdom. Gibson died in London after a long battle with cancer on 21 May 2025.

== See also ==
- List of first women lawyers and judges in Africa
