= Justine Aimée Ngounou Tchokonthieu =

Cameroonian magistrate

- Born: April 28, 1960 (age 66); Nkongsamba, Littoral Region, Cameroon
- Education: University of Yaoundé (Master's degree in French-speaking private law); National School of Administration and Magistracy (ENAM)
- Occupation: Magistrate
- Employer: Special Criminal Court (Cameroon)
- Known for: First woman appointed Attorney General of a Court of Appeal in Cameroon; first woman appointed Prosecutor General of the Special Criminal Court of Cameroon

Justine Aimée Ngounou Tchokonthieu (born April 28, 1960) is a Cameroonian magistrate. Prosecutor General of the Special Criminal Court (TCS) in 2015 and she is the first woman to occupy this position since its creation in 2012.

== Early life and education ==
Justine Aimée Ngounou was born on April 28, 1960, in Nkongsamba in the Littoral region of Cameroon. She did her primary and secondary studies there, before joining the University of Yaoundé in 1979. She obtained a master's degree in French-speaking private law. In 1983, she joined the National School of Administration and Magistracy (ENAM). In 1985, she graduated from the Magistracy section.

== Career ==
Her professional career began in the East as a deputy prosecutor at the Bertoua courts, then in Mbanga as a deputy prosecutor at the court of first instance. In July 2015, she was attorney general at the Northern Court of Appeal.
