= Amina Moussou Ouédraogo Traoré =

Burkinabe magistrate

- Aminata Mousso Traoré

Mediator of Burkina Faso
- In office 1 April 2005 – 19 July 2011
- Preceded by: Alain-Édouard Traoré
- Succeeded by: Alima Déborah Traoré

Personal details
- Born: June 12, 1948 (age 78) Ouagadougou, Upper Volta (now Burkina Faso)
- Spouse: Alioune Ouédraogo
- Children: 2
- Education: University of Aix-Marseille; École nationale de la magistrature
- Occupation: Lawyer; Magistrate; Politician
- Known for: First woman to serve as Mediator of Burkina Faso

Amina Mousso Ouédraogo real name Aminata Mousso Traoré (born June 12, 1948) is a Burkinabé lawyer and politician. She is the first woman to occupy the position of mediator of Burkina Faso from 2005 to 2011.

== Early life and education ==
Amina Mousso studied at Philipe Zinda Kaboré high school. After the baccalaureate, she obtained a scholarship to continue her studies in France at Aix-en-Province University. She obtained a law degree in 1976 and a Master's degree in law in the year 1977. After her studies, she returned to the country. She is the first woman to have held the position of mediator of Burkina Faso.

Amina Mousso is one of the first magistrates of Burkina Faso.

== Career ==
Amina Mousso Ouédraogo Traoré began her career in the judiciary in Burkina Faso in 1979. She joined the Ouagadougou High Court as a substitute prosecutor and then a prosecutor. Then in 1991, she was the first woman after Tiémoko Marc Garango and Jean-Baptiste Kafando to occupy the position of Burkina Faso mediator. She initiated the creation of the association of women lawyers of Burkina Faso. She is also the general secretary of the association of mediators of the member states of the West African Economic and Monetary Union (UEMOA). She is retired and continues to be a member of the board of directors of the Higher State Control Authority (ASCE-LC).

== Awards and recognition ==
On December 26, 2011, she received the title of National Officer of the Order of Merit.

== Personal life ==
Aminata Mousso is married to Alioune Ouédraogo, Professor of Physics at the Ki Zerbo University of Ouagadougou. She is the mother of two children (boys).
