= Annie Noëlle Bahounoui Batende =

Cameroonian magistrate

- Born: 25 January 1963 (age 63); Douala, Cameroon
- Education: University of Paris (DESS in Law); National School of Administration and Magistracy (ENAM)
- Occupation: Magistrate
- Employer: Special Criminal Court (Cameroon)
- Known for: First woman to serve as president of the Special Criminal Court of Cameroon
- Office: President of the Special Criminal Court
- Predecessor: Emmanuel Ndjérè

Annie Noëlle Bahounoui Batende (born 25 January 1963, in Douala) is a Cameroonian magistrate. She was appointed on 10 August 2020, as president of the Special Criminal Court (TCS). She is the first woman to hold this position since its creation in 2012.

== Early life and education ==
Bahounoui Batende was born on 25 January 1963, in Douala. She is the daughter of Léon Bahounoui Batende, a former senior Cameroonian civil servant, director of Customs (1971 to 1976), director of the Cameroonian Development Bank and deputy of the CPDM in the center (1997 to 2002).

After obtaining her baccalaureate at the Général-Leclerc high school in Yaoundé, she enrolled in the law faculty of the University of Paris, where she obtained a Specialized Higher Studies Diploma in Law (DESS).

She returned to Cameroon and failed the oral exam for the National School of Administration and Magistracy (ENAM) at the Cameroonian embassy in France. She began a career as a notary and worked for a year at the real estate company as a legal advisor. She took the ENAM competition again; she was finally selected, and joined the school in 1988.

== Career ==
Bahounoui Batende began her career as a public prosecutor. She was a deputy prosecutor in Nkongsamba. She then held the position of president of the court of first instance of Bonanjo in Douala and joined Mbalmayo where she officiated as president of the courts of first and high instance. In 2010, she was appointed to the position of vice-president of the Southern Court of Appeal. In 2012, she joined the TCS from its creation as an investigating judge. In 2017, she became vice-president.

She has been head of the Special Criminal Court (TCS) in Cameroon since 10 August 2020 and was appointed by presidential decree. She replaced Emmanuel Ndjérè.
