= Fátima Coronel =

Cape Verdean lawyer and jurist

President of the Supreme Court of Justice
- In office November 2015 – December 2020
- President: Jorge Carlos Fonseca
- Succeeded by: Benfeito Mosso Ramos

Personal details
- Born: Maria de Fátima Coronel Cape Verde

Maria de Fátima Coronel is a Cape Verdean lawyer and jurist who was President of the Supreme Court of Justice from November 2015 until her retirement in December 2020.

== Career ==
Coronel served as a Magistrate before becoming Attorney General and a Judge in criminal courts in Santa Catarina and Praia. She is not aligned with any political party and has been seen as an "exemplary" judge. She was a Supreme Court judge since at least 2007.

Coronel was nominated President of the Supreme Court of Justice by President Jorge Carlos Fonseca in November 2015, and affirmed by her judicial colleagues, the first woman to take on the position.

== See also ==
- List of first women lawyers and judges in Africa
