= Berthe Raharijaona =

Lawyer in Madagascar

Berthe Raharijaona (1908–2003) was a lawyer in Madagascar.

She attended Jules Ferry High School and later served as honorary president of the school's alumni association. She became the first Malagasy woman to receive a degree when she was awarded a bachelor's degree in 1929. She was a member of the Malagasy Young Women's Christian Union and later in life, she commissioned studies into the bible and its translation into Malagasy.

Raharijaona was the first female lawyer to be called to the bar in Madagascar. She was an honorary advocate at the Court of Appeal and also represented clients at the Supreme Court of Madagascar.

Raharijaona was also an academic writer, writing articles for the Malagasy Academy's journal on Malagscy law and also having works published on the historical rulers of Madagascar, particularly women rulers. She was vice-president of the Moral and Political Sciences Section of the Malagasy Academy. The academy held events in 1987 to celebrate Raharijaona's 55 years in academia.

Raharijaona was married to Jean and had a daughter, Suzanne, who is a sociologist working with the Malagasy Institute of Scientific Research (a local branch of the Institut de recherche pour le développement). Berthe died in early 2003.

== See also ==
- List of first women lawyers and judges in Africa
