= Maria do Céu Monteiro =

President of the Supreme Court of Guinea-Bissau

Maria do Céu Monteiro is the President of the Supreme Court of Guinea-Bissau. In 2012, she was elected President of the ECOWAS Court.
