= Mame Bassine Niang =

Senegalese lawyer

Marie "Mame" Bassine Niang (1951 - September 27, 2013) was the first Senegalese woman lawyer and founder of the National Organization for Human Rights of Senegal.

== Biography ==
Mame Bassin Niang was born into a Muslim family in 1951 in Tambacounda, Senegal. She is the daughter of Mbayang Madjiguène Débo and Bouna Sémou Niang.

Mame Bassin Niang studied law in France at the French commune of Aix-en-Provence. After her studies, she returned to Senegal to become its first black woman lawyer after admittance to the Dakar Bar in 1975.

Her professional career focused on the defense of human rights in a context of restricted freedom of thought. Her commitment led her to create the Organisation Nationale des Droits de L’Homme du Sénégal (ONDH) (English: National Organization for Human Rights of Senegal), of which she was the first president.

Considered as a feminist icon and concerned by the issue of women's emancipation, she was known to say, “if being a feminist means supporting women's causes because I am a woman, then I am truly a feminist.” The President of the Senegalese Human Rights League, Assane Dioma Ndiaye, remembers her as “a human rights icon, an emblematic figure, a pioneer who dared to defend widows and orphans in a context of pensée unique.”

She was one of the founding members of the Association des Juristes Sénégalaises (AJS) (English: Association of Senegalese Jurists). She was at the point the Vice President of the Fondation internationale des femmes juriste (IFAD), (English: International Foundation of Women Lawyers). She was High Commissioner for Human Rights under the presidency of Abdoulaye Wade. She died on September 27, 2013, in Dakar following a long illness at the age of 62.

She is the author of the autobiography, "Mémoires pour mon père". This laudatory depiction of her father also decries arranged marriages, which she considers a "grave prejudices to the intellectual and professional blooming of girls".

== See also ==
- List of first women lawyers and judges in Africa
- International Federation of Women Lawyers
