= Laure Pillay =

Mauritian lawyer and jurist (1917–2017)

Laure Pillay (16 March 1917 – 19 July 2017) was a Mauritian lawyer and jurist who was the country's first female barrister and first female magistrate.

== Early life and education ==
Laure Venchard was born on 16 March 1917, although her birth was not registered until 20 April. She was the eldest of eleven children. Her brother, Edwin, later became Solicitor General. She completed primary and secondary studies in Mauritius, then went to London in 1938 to study medicine at the Royal Free Hospital. When World War II broke out, she left her studies to work at the Foreign Office until 1945.

== Career ==
Pillay returned to Mauritius after the war and worked as a teacher of languages at Bhujoharry College in Port Louis before returning to study law. She was admitted to Lincoln's Inn and the Mauritius bar in 1955, making her the first female lawyer in Mauritius.

Pillay was an advocate for women's rights and represented Mauritius at seminars on women's roles in Africa in Addis Ababa and Berlin. She was a feminist and advocated for female victims of domestic violence, as well as handling many divorce cases.

Pillay was appointed as a magistrate on 31 March 1967, sitting at the courts of Port Louis, Mapou, and Flacq, making her the country's first female judge. She was later appointed a Senior Magistrate, before returning to private practice.

Pillay was a founding member of the Mauritius Family Planning Association. In 1986, she was appointed by the government to sit on a board of inquiry into drugs. In the 1990s, she was an assessor for the Industrial Relations Commission.

== Personal life ==
Pillay married Rabindra Pillay, who was working for the Royal Air Force, in 1943. She had three children, born in 1944, 1946, and 1960, five grandchildren, and seven great-grandchildren. Her husband died in 1992.

Pillay celebrated her 100th birthday in march 2017 and was the oldest member of the country's legal profession. She died on 19 July 2017.

== See also ==
- List of first women lawyers and judges in Africa
