= Nadingar Ekoue Thérèse =

First Chadian female lawyer and human rights activist

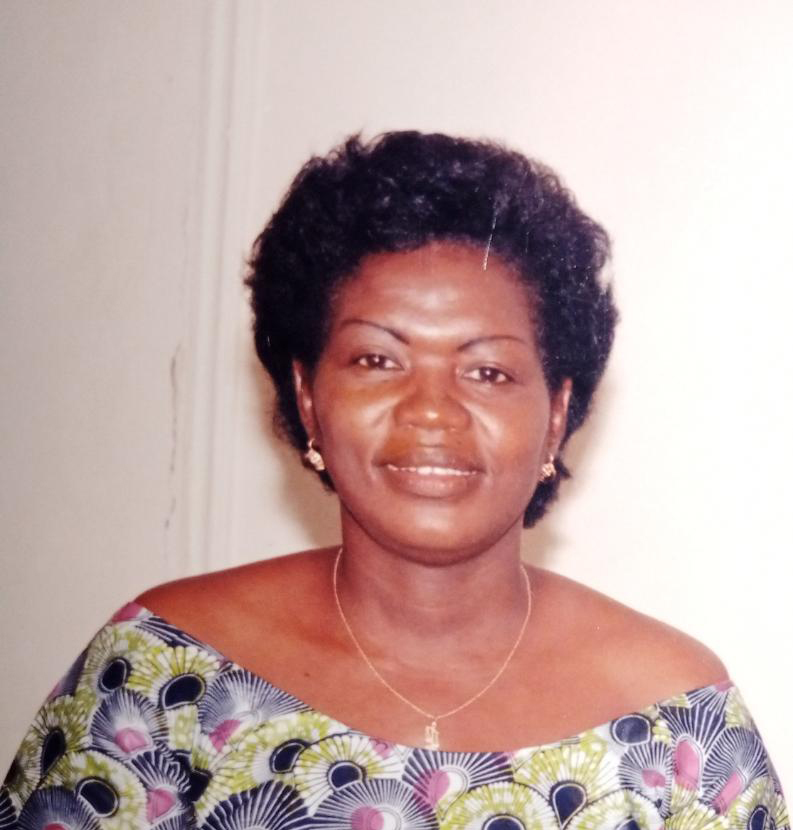
- Born: Nadingar Ekoue Thérèse; Chad
- Died: August 14, 2020
- Education: Masters Degree in Private Law
- Occupations: Lawyer and human rights activist
- Known for: Human Rights Defense
- Spouse: Emmanuel Nadingar
- Children: 5

Nadingar Ekoue Thérèse (died 14 August 2020) was a first Chadian female lawyer and human rights activist, who was known for her work in defending orphans and vulnerable people. She was secretary general of the Chad Bar Association.

== Early life and education ==
Ekoue Thérèse was born and raised in Chad but had her educational life in different countries.

She had her primary education at N'Djamena in Chad. She had her Certificate of Primary and Elementary Studies (CEPE) at Vichy in France in the year 1971.

She also gained some of her primary education at Notre Dame des Apôtres College in Lomé, Togo. After some years, she went back to the Chadian capital, N'Djamena and obtained her Brevet d'Etudes du Premier cycle (BEPC) in 1975 then the baccalaureate in 1978 at the Félix Eboué High School in Chad.

Ekoue Thérèse obtained a degree in private law at Marien Ngouabi University in Brazzaville, Congo.

== Career ==
Ekoue Thérèse was a lawyer from 1992. She opened a law firm after some years of experience and served as secretary general of the Chad Bar Association. She again trained five (5) lawyers in her country, Chad.

== Personal life ==
Ekoue Thérèse was married to Emmanuel Nadingar who was the former Prime Minister of Chad from March 2010 to January 2013. She had five children.

== Death ==
Ekoue Thérèse died on 14 August 2020.

== See also ==
- List of first women lawyers and judges in Africa
