= Miriam Weledji =

Cameroonian lawyer (1937 - 2024)

- Born: Miriam Ngunjo Shalo Weledji; December 13, 1937; Bamenda, Cameroon
- Died: March 11, 2024 (aged 86); Limbe, Cameroon
- Education: University of Oxford; Holborn College of Law; University College London
- Occupation: Lawyer
- Known for: First woman lawyer registered with the Cameroon Bar
- Children: 5

Miriam Weledji, real name Miriam Ngunjo Shalo Weledji (December 13, 1937 - March 11, 2024) was a Cameroonian lawyer. She was the first female lawyer registered with the Cameroon Bar.

== Early life and education ==
Miriam was born on December 13, 1937, in Bamenda. From 1944 to 1952, she received her primary education at the convent school of Soppo Buea where she again obtained her school leaving certificate. She went to Nigeria for her secondary education where she attended Holy Rosary College in Enugu. From 1952 to 1955, she passed her level II teaching certificate. In June 1958, she obtained the general certificate of education (O. Level) and two years later, the general certificate of education (A. Level).

After traveling through Nigeria, she continued to England. From 1965 to 1966, she studied at the University of Oxford and obtained a degree in administration. From 1966 to June 1968, she attended Holborn College of Law, where she obtained Bachelor in Law (LLB). From 1968 to 1969, she enrolled at University College of London.

== Career ==
In October 1968, Miriam became a barrister and honorable member of Gray's Inn.

She returned to Cameroon where she registered as a lawyer at the Supreme Court of Western Cameroon on June 9, 1969. She became the first female lawyer registered with the Cameroon Bar. She founded the Ngede law firm, headquartered in Limbé (formerly Victoria) in the southwest.

== Personal life ==
Miriam was the mother of five children.

== Death ==
Miriam died on March 11, 2024, at the age of 86 at her residence in Limbe.
