= Fatimata M'Baye =

Mauritanian lawyer (born 1957)

Fatimata M'baye
- فاطيماتا مباي
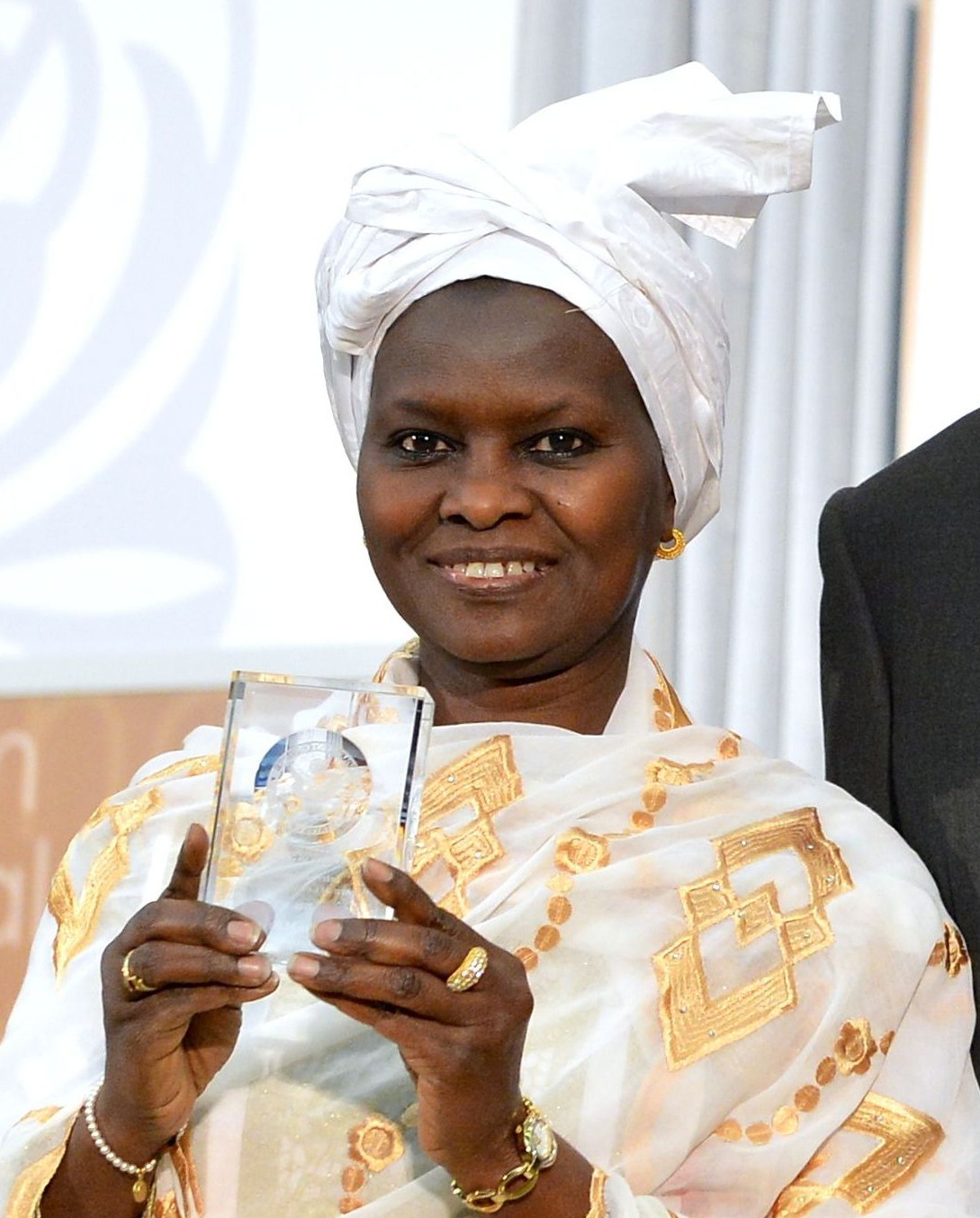
- M'baye in 2016
- Born: 1957 (age 68–69); Mauritania
- Education: University of Nouakchott
- Occupation: Lawyer
- Children: three Oumaima Salamata Toure, Cheikh Abdallahi Cherif, Osmane Cherif Toure

Fatimata M'baye (Arabic: فاطيماتا مباي; born 1957) is a Mauritanian lawyer. She has campaigned for human rights in her country. In 2016, she was given an International Women of Courage Award by the U.S. Secretary of State.

== Life ==
M'Baye was born in 1957 in Mauritania. At age 12 she was forcibly married to a 45-year-old man, but fought her family for the chance to attend school. From 1981 to 1985 she studied law and economics at the University of Nouakchott, becoming the first female lawyer in her home country.

In 1991, Fatimata Mbaye helped to found the Mauritanian Human Rights Association, or AMDH, and became the Association's president in 2006. In 1998, a report on the still-extant and widespread practice of slavery in Mauritania aired on French television, she and the organization's then president, Cheikh Saad Bouh Kamara, were arrested without warrant. She was charged with the crime of being a member of a non-government approved association, sentenced to 13 months in prison, and a large fine.

M'Baye is Chair of the Committee for Women's Rights and founder and leader of the Social Commission of the AMDH. She is a consulting lawyer of various organizations and in 1997 she was an observer in the presidential elections in Mauritania.

Her commitment to oppression and slavery in Mauritania brought her in 1987, a prison sentence of six months. In 1998, she was sentenced to another prison term of thirteen months for belonging to an unapproved union, yet under the pressure of an international campaign she was pardoned by the country's President.

Mbaye began to receive international attention after her work and life was included in "Mauritania: A Question of Rape," a BBC documentary on the convictions of female rape survivors with the crime of zina.

In 2013, Mbaye joined a three-person UN commission of inquiry in the Central African Republic with Bernard Muna and Philip Alston. This commission worked in a hostile and violent atmosphere and in a constrained manner, but in 2015 released a final report to the Security Council accusing all belligerent parties in the CAR Civil War of crimes against humanity.

== Awards ==
Fatimata Mbaye received the Nuremberg International Human Rights Award in 1999 for her work against slavery in Mauritania and racial and ethnic discrimination.

In 2012, Hillary Clinton honored Mbaye as a Hero in the Trafficking in Persons Report.

On 28 March 2016, John Kerry, as Secretary of State, recognized Fatimata Mbaye during the 2016 International Women of Courage Awards for her contributions to the legal protection of human rights in Mauritania and her commitment to human dignity, stating:

Fatimata M'Baye has long been a voice of reason and tolerance in a country affected by ethnic tensions. As Mauritania's first woman attorney, Fatimata has taken on difficult cases. She has defended the rights of activists and advocated for the prosecution of human traffickers. She helped draft a law criminalizing slavery. She represents the "committee of widows", a group seeking justice for the murder of their husbands during a period of upheaval in the late 1980s.

Asked about her role, she said, "I could be born white, yellow, Mongolian, or Kurdish, and I would have recognized myself in each of these. For me the value of the human being is above everything."

— John Kerry, 14 Women of Courage

M'Baye has three children.

== See also ==
- First women lawyers around the world
