= Hélène Cazès-Benatar =

Moroccan Jewish lawyer and human rights activist

- Born: Rachel Hélène Cazès; 27 October 1898; Tangier, Morocco
- Died: 7 July 1979 (aged 80); Paris, Île-de-France, France
- Education: University of Bordeaux

Hélène Cazès-Benatar (27 October 1898 – 7 July 1979) was a Moroccan Jewish lawyer and human rights activist. During World War II she organized relief efforts in North Africa for Jewish and other refugees.

== Early life ==
Rachel Hélène Cazès was born in Tangier, the daughter of Amram Cazès and Miriam Nahon. Her family moved to Casablanca in 1917. After completing law studies in Bordeaux, she became Morocco's first woman lawyer.

== Career ==
Cazès-Benatar was active in various charitable causes in Casablanca, including kindergartens and milk for children. During World War II she volunteered with the Red Cross in Casablanca. She organized services for refugees from Europe, as founder and first president of the Moroccan Refugee Aid Committee, including three relief camps in Casablanca.

After the war, she helped many Jewish refugees in North Africa to relocate again to Israel. She toured the United States giving lectures in 1953 and 1954, to raise funds for her work. She was the North African representative of the World Jewish Congress. She wrote the reports on Tangier, French Morocco, and Spanish Morocco for the American Jewish Year Book for 1955.

== Personal life ==
Hélène Cazès married Moses Benatar in 1920. She was widowed when Benatar died in 1939. Hélène Cazès-Benatar moved to Paris in 1962, and died there in 1979, aged 80 years. Some of her papers are preserved in the Central Archives for the History of the Jewish People (CAHJP) in Jerusalem.

== See also ==
- List of first women lawyers and judges in Africa
