= Radwa Helmi =

Egyptian judge

Radwa Helmi is an Egyptian jurist who in 2022 became the first woman judge to preside on the country's State Council.

== Career ==
Although there are hundreds of women lawyers in Egypt and no laws barring women from being judges, the country had traditionally had male only courts. The first female judge was Tahani al-Gebali, appointed to the Supreme Constitutional Court in 2003. The State Council had repeatedly rejected women applicants. On 3 October 2021, President Abdel Fattah el-Sisi made a decree that saw 98 women appointed to join the State Council, in line with Article 11 of the nation's 2014 Constitution, which guarantees women the right to be in public positions, including on judicial bodies, without discrimination. On the women were sworn in before the council's chief judge Mohammed Hossam el-Din in Cairo, Helmi said, "This is a memorable day. It is a dream for us and for past generations as well ... Being a woman in one of the chief judiciary institutions in Egypt and the Arab world was a dream." The new judges spent five months undergoing training with the National Training Academy and the Studies Centre of the council.

On 5 March 2022, Helmi became the first female judge to preside over the council. Helmi said she was proud of her "great responsibility", describing the President's decision as "an essential part of supporting every Egyptian woman”. She later said in a media interview, "The world is changing, and it is necessary to work on self-development, which will open doors to distinguished titles and show the ingenuity and capabilities of women."

In August 2024, Helmi and two other female judges were the first women appointed to the General Secretariat and Technical Office of the Presidency of the State Council.
