= Victoria Onejeme =

Nigerian attorney general (1930–2017)

Victoria Uzoamaka Onejeme (November 22, 1930 – April 27, 2017) was a Nigerian attorney general and the first woman to occupy the position. She was called to the bar in 1965, and assumed the role of attorney general in the old Anambra State in 1976. In 1976, she was sworn in as Commissioner for Justice in Anambra State. She also made history in 1984 when she became the pioneer judge for Federal High Court, Abuja. She is an Igbo from Awka in Anambra State and the first Igbo woman to be appointed a Judge in Nigeria. Onejeme died on April 27, 2017, at the age of 86.
