= Manassa Danioko =

Malian jurist and diplomat

President of the Constitutional Court of Mali
- In office 2015–2020
- President: Ibrahim Boubacar Keïta
- Succeeded by: Position abolished

Justice on the Constitutional Court of Mali
- In office 2005–2020

Personal details
- Born: Diakité Manassa Danioko; January 19, 1945 (age 81) Kadiolo, Mali

Diakité Manassa Danioko (born 19 January 1945) is a Malian jurist and diplomat. She served as president of the Constitutional Court of Mali from 2015 to 2020.

== Education and career ==
Danioko was born on 19 January 1945 in Kadiolo, Mali. She received a baccalaureate in 1966. Danioko received a master's degree in law from the National School of Administration in 1970.

Dianoko served as President of the Labor Court or Ségou from 1970 to 1971, and she participated in a series of court internships in France beginning in October 1971. From 1972 to 1978, she was a deputy prosecutor at the Court of First Instance. She was General Counsel to the Bamako Court of Appeal from 1979 to 1981, Superior Council for the judiciary from 1979 to 1988, and advisor to the Special Court of State Security from 1983 to 1988.

Danioko was suspended from the judiciary in 1988. She challenged the suspension, and the Supreme Court of Mali overturned it in 1991. She was the Prosecutor General at the Court of Appeal of Bamako from 1991 to 1995. Danioko served as a diplomat to several countries in the Americas from 1995 to 2002. She served as Director of the DNAJ from 2004 to 2005. Danioko was appointed to the Constitutional Court of Mali in 2005. In 2015, she was elected the President of the Constitutional Court. She was the first woman to hold this position. She served in this position until the court was dissolved in July 2020.

Danioko was one of the figures opposed by protestors in 2020. In August 2020, Amnesty International reported that Danioko's bodyguards had been seen shooting at political protesters that were near her home.
