= Zaynab Abd al-Razzaq =

Moroccan lawyer

- Born: 1938 (age 87–88); Fez, Fez-Meknes, Morocco
- Occupations: lawyer and the first female judge in Morocco

Zaynab Abd al-Razzaq (born 1938) was a Moroccan lawyer and the first female judge in Morocco.

== Biography ==
al-Razzaq was born in Fez. Her father was a judge in the town of Tissa, Fès-Meknès and her younger sister Amina Abd al-Razzaq also pursued a legal career and became a judge.

In 1960, she became the first woman judge in Morocco when appointed to the sadad court in Rabat.
