= Exalgina Gambôa =

Angolan judge

- Born: Exalgina Renée Vicente Olavo Gambôa
- Education: Agostinho Neto University; Instituto Superior de Economia e Gestão
- Occupations: Alkali, jami'ar diflomasiyya, 'yar siyasa
- Known for: Shugabar Kotun Binciken Kuɗaɗen Angola
- Office: Shugabar Kotun Binciken Kuɗaɗen Angola

Exalgina Gambôa is an Angolan judge who presided over the Court of Auditors and served as secretary of state for foreign affairs of Angola. She was appointed judge of the Court of Auditors in 2018 by President João Lourenço on the recommendation of the Superior Council for the Judiciary.
