= Amal Othman =

Egyptian politician (born 1934)

Amal Abdulrahim Othman
- Born: 13 February 1934 (age 91)
- Occupation: Minister

Amal Abdulrahim Othman (Arabic: امال عبد الرحيم عثمان; born 13 February 1934) is a former Egyptian minister, member of the dissolved National Democratic Party and a former member of the Egyptian People's Assembly (Parliament) from the Dokki district of Giza governorate. She served as Minister of Insurance and Social Affairs in 15 successive ministries from the ministry of Mamdouh Salem's third ministry to the first Kamal al-Ganzouri for about 20 years during the period from 3 February 1977 to 8 July 1997 under the chairmanship of nine different heads of ministry.

== Education ==
License of Law Cairo University, 1955. Diploma in Criminal Sciences and Masters from Cairo University, 1958

PhD in Criminal Matters, Cairo University, 1964

PhD from the University of Rome, in the idea of the moral professor in comparative law, 1964

== Career ==
National Democratic Party – Political Bureau

National Council for Women (Egypt)

Professor at the Faculty of Law, Cairo University, and supervised many of the doctoral dissertations and master in the criminal department.
