= Aimée Kanyana =

Burundian government minister

Aimée Laurentine Kanyana is a magistrate and politician in Burundi.

== Career ==
She was appointed Minister of Justice and Keeper of Seal in August 2015 and was previously the vice-president of the Bank of the Republic of Burundi (BRB).

She was appointed of the magistrate of the Constitutional Court of Burundi in 2013. and is one of several justices who authorized President of Burundi Pierre Nkurunziza to run for a third presidential term against article 96 of Burundian constitution (enacted in 2005) which limits the term of president to two. This third term approval for Nkurunziza sparked the Burundian unrest (2015–2018).

== See also ==
- Judiciary of Burundi
- Supreme Court of Burundi
