= Kellelo Justina Mafoso-Guni =

Mosotho lawyer

Justice on the African Court on Human and Peoples' Rights
- In office 2006–2010

Justice in the High Court of Lesotho
- In office ?–?

Crown Counsel in Lesotho
- In office 1970–?

Personal details
- Born: December 8, 1945 Hlotse, Basutoland (present-day Lesotho)
- Died: June 5, 2024 (aged 78)
- Education: University of Lesotho, University of Edinburgh

Kellelo Justina Mafoso-Guni (December 8, 1945 – June 5, 2024) was a Mosotho lawyer, the first female lawyer in Lesotho, as well as a former justice of the African Court on Human and Peoples' Rights and the High Court of Lesotho (where she was the first woman on the Court).

== Early life and education ==
Mafoso-Guni was born in Hlotse on December 8, 1945. She studied law at the University of Lesotho and the University of Edinburgh. She became the first female lawyer in Lesotho.

== Career ==
Mafoso-Guni was appointed Crown Counsel in Lesotho in 1970. She then moved to the United Kingdom and worked in the civil serve for twelve years. She returned to Africa and was appointed magistrate in Zimbabwe on 28 September 1980, the first woman appointed to the bench. She served there for twelve years. Other sources have erroneously stated that Mavis Gibson was the first female judge in Zimbabwe's history. While Gibson did serve as a judge in Zimbabwe, she was actually the High Court of Namibia's first female judge.

Mafoso-Guni returned to Lesotho and was appointed to the High Court of Lesotho, again as the first female judge. In 2006, she was elected as one of the first judges of the African Court on Human and Peoples' Rights for a four-year term, one of two women alongside Sophia Akuffo.

She died on June 5, 2024.

== Publications ==
- Guni, Kelello (1990). "The Problem of Baby-Dumping in Zimbabwe". Working Paper. 26. University of Oslo, Institute of Women's Law.
- Mafoso-Guni, Kelello (1994). Report on Parliamentarians Workshop held on 16th November, 1994 : Maseru Sun Cabanas. FIDA.

== Judicial writings ==
- Ntsapo Petlane (Born Makunya) v Mathe Petlane & Another (Duly assisted). CIV/APN/476/9825. August 1999
- R. Potoketsi v. Rex. CRI/A/22/98 . 15 February 1999
- African Oxygen Ltd v. Stm Marketing & Agencies Ltd & Another. CIV/APN/191/99, CIV/APN/270/99. 7 April 2000
- Ned Bank (Lesotho) Ltd v. Sotho Development Corporation (Pty) Ltd. CIV/T/450/99. 23 May 2000
- Rex v. Lisebo Mokhoro. CRI/T/39/96. 24 November 2000.
- Theresia Leoma v. Makhang Leoma. CIV/APN/465/99, CIV/APN/520/99. 8 August 2000

== See also ==
- List of first women lawyers and judges in Africa
