= Mireille Ndiaye =

Senegalese senior judge

Mireille Ndiaye was a senior Senegalese judge of German and Togolese origin.

Ndiaye served as first deputy judge at the Dakar Court of First Instance, then a general attorney at the Dakar Court of Appeal, general attorney at the Supreme Court, then cumulatively President of the Criminal Chamber of the Senegalese Court of Cassation and general inspector courts.
