= Harimia Ahmed =

Comorian lawyer

- Occupation: Lawyer
- Years active: 1981–present
- Known for: First female lawyer in the Comoros; former Comoros minister of justice; president of Comorian bar council; honorary consul of Senegal to Comoros
- Spouse: Dr Ahamada Said Fazul

Harimia Ahmed is a Comorian lawyer. The first female lawyer in the country, she has served as Minister of Justice and president of the bar council. Ahmed acted as defense counsel for high-profile clients in the islands' courts.

== Career ==
Harimia Ahmed is the wife of Idi Nadhoim, Vice-President of the Comoros from 2006 to 2011. She has been practising as a lawyer since at least 1994 and was the first female lawyer to work in the Comoros. Ahmed was a representative of the Comoros in the fourth Indian Ocean Law Faculty Competition, held at Moroni between in April 2003. She participated in a fictitious public trial with lawyers from the francophone countries of the Comoros, Madagascar, Mauritius and the French-dependency of Réunion all taking part.

Ahmed served three terms as president of the Comoros bar council. She said that the council had grown from two members in 1968 to more than 40 at the end of her term. Ahmed has ambitions to improve transparency, equality of service and efficiency of the council's members. During her time as bar council president, Ahmed also served as a legal adviser to the Comoros government and was the Minister of Justice in 2007. In 2010, Ahmed served as the vice-president of the Comoros chapter of the Africa Center for Strategic Studies and was appointed an honorary consul of Senegal to Comoros in 2012.

In 2000 Ahmed served as defence counsel to former Comoros Assembly member Cheikh Ali Bacar Kassim, a noted opponent of the military-coup leader and then president Assoumani Azzali, who exposed financial scandals at top levels of the government and called for its overthrow. Ahmed was denied permission to meet with Kassim as a result of which the latter went on hunger strike.

In 2011 Ahmed represented Brigadier-General Salimou Mogamed Amiri, former chief of staff of the Comoros Army for the murder of Lieutenant-Colonel Combo Ayouba and for rebellion. Fourteen of Amiri's bodyguards were also charged with rebellion in the course of resisting the arrest of their general. Amiri and all but four of his bodyguards were found not guilty of the charge of rebellion, but he continued to be held under house arrest on the murder charge.

== See also ==
- First women lawyers around the world
