= Thérèse Traoré =

Burkinabe judge

Thérèse Traoré (née Sanou) is a Burkinabe judge who was the first president of the Court of Cassation of Burkina Faso, appointed in 2014. In June 2018, she was retired alongside prosecutor of the Court of Cassation and the High Court of Justice, Armand Ouédraogo by the Disciplinary Council of the Superior Council of the Judiciary on corruption allegation, although the Council of State quashed the retirement on 10 July 2018. She was later replaced on 24 May 2019 by Mazobé Jean Kondé.
