= 'Neile Alina 'Mantoa Fanana =

Lesotho lawyer (born 1945)

- Born: 1945 (age 80–81)
- Occupations: Lawyer, ombudsman
- Known for: First woman to be appointed ombudsman of Lesotho

'Neile Alina 'Mantoa Fanana (born 1945) is a Lesotho lawyer. She was appointed the ombudsman of Lesotho in 2010, and was the first women lawyer in the country.

== Career ==
'Neile Alina 'Mantoa Fanana was born in 1945. Fanana was awarded a Bachelor of Arts degree in law by the National University of Lesotho in 1980. She subsequently attended the University of Edinburgh in the United Kingdom where she was awarded Bachelor of Laws and Master of Philosophy degrees. Fanana went on to lecture at the National University and received further training human rights law, international humanitarian law and the resolution of conflicts. In 1989 she presented a paper on the treatment of women under Lesotho's inheritance law to a regional legal seminar.

Upon the restoration of democracy to Lesotho in 1993 Fanana worked with the Ministry of Justice, Human Rights and Correctional Services to improve administration and reduce corruption. She also helped to bring new legislation forward to improve the rights of women and children and to restrict money laundering and corruption. Fanana was appointed King's Counsel, a status conferred on senior barristers, in 2009. By 2010 Fanana had become dean and pro-vice chancellor of the National University. She has written for the Lesotho Law Journal on the rights of citizens under the African Charter on Human and Peoples' Rights, women's rights, and legal dualism.

Fanana was appointed ombudsman to Lesotho by King Letsie III of Lesotho on 14 October 2010, the third person to hold the role. She commenced her four-year term in the role on 30 November, replacing Sekara Mafisa who had served two full terms. Fanana is the first woman to hold the role. Her duties are to investigate complaints made by citizens against members of the government or their agencies.
