= Laurinda Cardoso =

Angolan lawyer and jurist

President of the Constitutional Court of Angola
- Incumbent
- Assumed office 2021

Personal details
- Born: 17 June 1975 (age 51)
- Party: MPLA
- Education: Agostinho Neto University; Católica Lisbon School of Business & Economics

Laurinda Jacinto Prazeres Monteiro Cardoso (born 17 June 1975) is an Angolan lawyer and jurist who has been President of the Constitutional Court since 2021.

== Early life and education ==
Cardoso has a degree in economic law and a postgraduate degree in business law from Agostinho Neto University in cooperation with the University of Coimbra. She has a postgraduate degree in business management from the Católica Lisbon School of Business & Economics.

== Career ==
From 2008 to 2011, Cardoso worked with the World Bank preparing business and employment statistics. From 2010 to 2017, she was director of the Legal Office of the Ministry of Territory Administration under Bornito de Sousa. She then became a member of the Superior Council of the Judiciary of the Public Ministry.

Cardoso is a member of the Angolan Labor Lawyers Association and the Provincial Council of the Angolan Bar Association. She has been a member of the MPLA Political Bureau since June 2019.

Cardoso became Secretary of State for the Administration of the Territory in 2020. She was appointed President of the Constitutional Court by President João Lourenço in August 2021, after the resignation of Manuel Aragāo who had voted against proposed constitutional amendments which he said would lead to the "suicide of the democratic rule of law." She resigned her membership of the MPLA political party upon her appointment.

Cardoso's appointment received criticism due to her previous ties to the ruling political party and therefore "habit of obedience to the President", as well as her involvement in "irregular business schemes". In 2018, she was involved in a half-billion dollar scam when large amounts of money were transferred from the Banco Espírito Santo Angola to five shell companies. After her appointment to the Court, reports emerged that her husband's construction company Anteros had benefited from contracts from the Ministry of Territory Administration where she served as Secretary of State.

One of Cardoso's first rulings effectively overthrew the leader of the largest opposition party, UNITA, Adalberto Costa Júnior, ruling that his election was illegal as he held dual (Portuguese) nationality. In December 2021, she rejected an injunction application by a candidate for MPLA leadership, Antonio Venancio, who appealed the ruling on the grounds of her previous involvement in the party.

== Personal life ==
Cardoso is married to businessman Pedro Monteiro Cardoso, who was born in Cape Verde and has Portuguese citizenship. Cardoso has Portuguese citizenship through her husband.
