= Thérèse Dejean =

Central African Republic lawyer and magistrate

Thérèse Dejean (born December 28, 1946) is a lawyer and the first female magistrate in the Central African Republic.

In 1992, Thérèse Dejean founded the Association of Women Lawyers of the Central African Republic for the defense and protection of women working in the field of law and directed it until 1999.
