= Leatile Dambe =

Botswana lawyer and judge

Leatile Isabella Dambe is a Botswana lawyer and judge who served as the first woman chief judge of the High Court of Botswana and first deputy director Public Prosecution of Botswana.

== Education and career ==
Leatile Dambe holds a master of law (LLM) majoring in banking and finance from Queen Mary University, London. She was deputy attorney general in charge of prosecution before being appointed deputy director Public Prosecution. She is the first person to serve in this office after its creation in a constitution amendment that came into force on 1 October 2005. She served in this office until 2010.
