= Marie Colardeau =

Marie-Josèphe Paule Julianne le Vigoureux de Kermorvan (30 April 1910 – 20 January 1993), known as Marie Colardeau, was a French feminist and the first female lawyer from the French overseas territory of Réunion.

== Biography ==
Colardeau was born in 1910 in Saint-Pierre, Réunion, the daughter of Saint-Pierre mayor Charles-Louis-Victor le Vigoureux de Kermorvan. Her family were old nobility from Franche-Comté. She gained her law license in 1929, and in 1930 became the first female lawyer in Réunion. In 1937, she married the politician Fernand Colardeau.

She died in 1993 in Saint-Denis, Réunion, aged 82.

== See also ==
- List of first women lawyers and judges in Africa
