= Meriem Belmihoub =

Algerian independence fighter, lawyer, and feminist (1935–2021)

Meriem Belmihoub-Zerdani
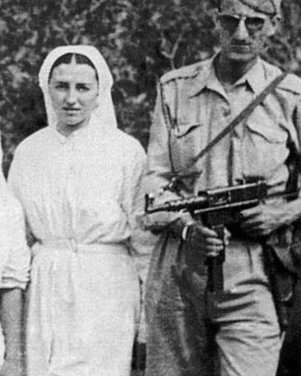
- Belmihoub in 1956
- Born: 1 April 1935; Algiers, Algeria
- Died: 27 July 2021 (aged 86)

Meriem Belmihoub-Zerdani (1 April 1935 – 27 July 2021) was an Algerian independence fighter, lawyer and feminist.

== Life ==
As a student in the law faculty, in May 1956 Belmihoub became one of the first students to respond to the call of the National Liberation Front to serve as a nurse alongside the armed struggle for Algerian independence. Imprisoned in France for her activity providing medical care to Algerian soldiers, she and other women prisoners protested their incarceration in letters which were republished by the French humanitarian organization Secours populaire français, as well as in pamphlets of the Tunis-based Committee of Women Students of Algeria, Tunisia and Morocco.

Belmihoub became a deputy in the 1962–3 Constituent Assembly. She contributed to a series of articles published by the daily newspaper Le Peuple in August 1963, addressing the question 'Is there an Algerian women problem?':

We cannot talk about the emancipation of women by talking about the veil and traditions, but by giving her work.

In 1964 Belmihoub became one of the first two indigenous Algerian women to be called to the Bar of Algiers.

She has served as Vice-Chair of the Convention on the Elimination of All Forms of Discrimination Against Women (CEDAW). In 2012 she protested the exclusion of women veterans from the office of the National War Veterans' Organisation (ONM):

Fifty years after independence, it is unfortunate that women veterans are not represented in this office. We went into the maquis, fought in the same way as the men. We are asking for our share. The Constitution enshrined gender equality.
