= Immaculée Nyirinkwaya =

Rwandan judge

Immaculée Nyirinkwaya (born 1958) was a Rwandan judge and the first woman appointed justice of the Supreme Court of Rwanda in 1996. She was inaugural vice chancellor of the Institute of Legal Practice and Development (ILPD).

== Education and career ==
Nyirinkwaya in 1982, earned a degree in commercial law from University of Paris II-Assas and another degree in insurance law. She began her judicial career in France where she served with different companies including French Aviation Agency, Organization Nouvelle d'Assurances, National Insurance Company of Zurich and at SONARWA as director of litigation. Upon her return to Rwanda, she was appointed to the Institute of Legal Practice and Development (ILPD) as its first vice chancellor. She served in position until 1996 when she was appointed a justice of the Supreme Court of Rwanda. She was the first woman to seat on the Rwandan supreme court as a justice and served for 27 years before retiring in 2023.
