= Patricia Kameri-Mbote =

Professor Patricia Kameri-Mbote
- Occupations: Professor and Director of the Law Division of the United Nations Environment Programme (UNEP)
- Parent: Venanzio Kameri (Father) Helen Njeri (Mother)

Academic background
- Education: Mūgoiri Primary School, Mūrang'a County. St. Michael’s Primary School in Kirinyaga County, 1976. Loreto High School, Limuru, Ordinary and Advanced Level Studies, 1982. Bachelor of Laws (LL.B) degree in University of Nairobi, 1987. Postgraduate Diploma in Law, Kenya School of Law in 1988. Master’s in Law and Development, University of Warwick, United Kingdom, 1989. Postgraduate Diploma in Women’s Law, University of Zimbabwe,1994 to 1995. Master of the Science of Law (JSM), University of Warwick, 1996. Doctor of the Science of Law (JSD) Stanford University, 1999
- Alma mater: Kenya School of Law, 1988 University of Nairobi,1987 University of Warwick, 1996 Stanford University, 1996

Patricia Kameri-Mbote (born 19 March 1964) is a Kenyan lawyer, academic, and international environmental law scholar. She is currently the Director of the Law Division of the United Nations Environment Programme (UNEP) United Nations Environment Programme.She is the first female professor of law in Kenya and the first woman to serve as Dean of the School of Law at the University of Nairobi. Kameri-Mbote has made significant contributions to environmental law, gender, and constitutional development in Kenya and internationally.

== Early life ==
Kameri-Mbote was born on 19 March 1964 into a family of nine children in rural Kenya. Her parents, Venanzio Kameri and Helen Njeri, emphasized education and treated their children equally regardless of gender. She attended Mugoiri Primary School in Murang’a County before transferring to St. Michael's Primary School in Kirinyaga County, where she completed her primary education in 1976. She later joined Loreto High School, Limuru, completing her Ordinary and Advanced Level studies in 1982.

== Education ==
In 1984, Kameri-Mbote enrolled in the Faculty of Law at the University of Nairobi, graduating with a Bachelor of Laws (LL.B) degree in 1987 with Second Class Honours (Upper Division). She went on to complete a Postgraduate Diploma in Law at the Kenya School of Law in 1988, after which she was admitted to the Roll of Advocates of Kenya.

She pursued a Master's in Law and Development at the University of Warwick, United Kingdom, graduating in 1989.From 1994 to 1995, she studied gender and the law at the University of Zimbabwe, earning a Postgraduate Diploma in Women's Law. She then obtained a Master of the Science of Law (JSM) from University of Warwick, 1996 and a Doctor of the Science of Law (JSD) in 1999 from Stanford University, where her doctoral research focused on property rights and environmental law.

In 2011, Kameri-Mbote became the first female professor of law in Kenya. She was awarded a Higher Doctorate (LL.D) by the University of Nairobi in 2019 for her thesis Contending Norms in a Plural Legal System: The Limits of Formal Law. The University of Oslo conferred on her an honorary doctorate in law in 2017.

== Career ==
Kameri-Mbote joined the University of Nairobi School of Law as a lecturer in 1994, later becoming professor and dean (2012–2016) As dean, she oversaw curriculum reforms, infrastructure modernization, and expansion to campuses in Mombasa and Kisumu. She is a founding research director of the International Environmental Law Research Centre (IELRC) and served as its Africa programme director for over 20 years. Internationally, she has taught at the University of Kansas, University of Zimbabwe, and Stellenbosch University, and has held visiting roles at other institutions.

In her legal career, she was conferred the rank of Senior Counsel in Kenya in 2012, recognizing her exemplary service to the legal profession. In 2021, she was appointed Director of the Law Division at UNEP. She has been involved in the Montevideo Environmental Law Programme since 2007, is a board member of the International Council on Environmental Law (ICEL), and has consulted for organizations including UNEP, UNDP, WIPO, the World Bank, and NORAD. She is board member of the International Development Law Organization (IDLO) and the Chair of the Association of Environmental Law Lecturers in African Universities (ASSELLAU).

== Community service and public life ==
In 2006, President Mwai Kibaki appointed Kameri-Mbote as a member of the Committee of Eminent Persons to advise on Kenya's stalled constitutional review process. She contributed to the drafting of the 2010 Constitution of Kenya, advocating for women's rights and equality provisions. She was also involved in the Building Bridges Initiative (BBI) discussions in 2019 She has served on several boards, including the Advocates Coalition for Development and Environment (ACODE-Uganda), Women and Law in East Africa (WLEA), and the IUCN Commission on Environmental Law. In 2015, she was awarded the national honor of Elder of the Burning Spear (EBS) for her service to the nation.

== Selected works ==
- Kameri-Mbote, P., & Akech, M. (2012). Kenyan Courts and Politics of the Rule of Law in the Post-Authoritarian State. East African Journal of Peace & Human Rights, Human Rights and Peace Centre (HURIPEC), Faculty of Law, Makerere University.
- Kameri-Mbote, P. (2011). Challenges to Sustainability in Africa. Development, 54(2), 243–246.
- Kameri-Mbote, P. (2010). Land Tenure, Land Use and Sustainability in Kenya: Towards Innovative Use of Property Rights in Conservation of Biodiversity. Waseda Proceedings of Comparative Law, 13, 158–183.
- Kameri-Mbote, P., & Odote, C. (2009). Courts as Champions of Sustainable Development: Lessons from East Africa. Sustainable Development Law & Policy, 10(1), 31–38.
- Kameri-Mbote, P. (2009). What would it take to Realise the Promises? Protecting Women's Rights in the Kenya National Land Policy of 2009. Feminist Africa, 12, 87–94.
- Kameri-Mbote, P., & Kindiki, K. (2009). Trouble in Eden: How and Why Unresolved Land Issues Landed “Peaceful Kenya” in Trouble in 2008. Forum for Development Studies, 1, 167–193.
- Kameri-Mbote, P. (2009). Righting Wrongs: Confronting Land Dispossession in Post-colonial Contexts. East African Law Review, 103–124.
- Kameri-Mbote, P., & Kabira, N. (2008). Separating the Baby from the Bath Water: Women's Rights and the Politics of Constitution-Making in Kenya. East African Journal of Peace & Human Rights, 14(1), 1–43.
- Kameri-Mbote, P. (2008). Gender, Rights and Development: An East African Perspective. Forum for Development Studies, 1, 91–100.
- Kameri-Mbote, P. (2007). Achieving the Millennium Development Goals in the Drylands: Gender Considerations. Annals of Arid Zones, 46.
- Kameri-Mbote, P. (2007). Use of the Public Trust Doctrine in Environmental Law. Law, Environment and Development Journal, 3(2).
- Kameri-Mbote, P. (2006). Women, Land Rights and the Environment: The Kenyan Experience. Development, 49(3), 43–48.
- Kameri-Mbote, P. (2005). Towards Greater Access to Justice in Environmental Disputes in Kenya: Opportunities for Intervention. Law Society Digest (July).
- Kameri-Mbote, P. (2004). Sustainable Management of Wildlife Resources in East Africa: A Critical Analysis of the Legal, Policy and Institutional Frameworks. East African Law Review.
- Kameri-Mbote, P. (2004). Towards a Liability and Redress System under the Cartagena Protocol on Biosafety: A Review of the Kenya National Legal System. East African Law Journal.
- Kameri-Mbote, P. (2004). The Coverage of Gender Issues in the Draft Bill of the Constitution of Kenya, 2002: Have the Hens Finally Come Home to Roost for Kenyan Women? University of Nairobi Law Journal.
- Kameri-Mbote, P. (2003). Community, Farmers’ and Breeders’ Rights in Africa: Towards a Legal Framework for sui generis Legislation. The ICFAI Journal of Intellectual Property Rights, 2(4).
- Kameri-Mbote, P. (2003). Globalisation and the International Governance of Modern Biotechnology in Kenya: Implications for Food Security. IDS Working Paper 199, Biotechnology Policy Series 20, IDS, Brighton.
- Nnadozie, K., Kiambi, D., Mugabe, J., Attah-Krah, K., & Kameri-Mbote, P. (2003). Plant Genetic Resources in Africa's Renewal: Policy, Legal & Programmatic Issues under the New Partnership for Africa's Development. IPGRI, Nairobi.
- Kameri-Mbote, P. (2003). Gender Considerations in Constitution-Making: Engendering Women's Rights in the Legal Process. University of Nairobi Law Journal.
- Kameri-Mbote, P. (2003). Community, Farmers’ and Breeders’ Rights in Africa: Towards a Legal Framework for sui generis Legislation. University of Nairobi Law Journal.
- Kameri-Mbote, P. (2002). Gender Dimensions of Law, Colonialism and Inheritance in East Africa: Kenyan Women's Experiences. VRÜ – Verfassung und Recht in Übersee (Law and Politics in Africa, Asia and Latin America).
- Odame, H., Wafula, D., & Kameri-Mbote, P. (2002). Innovation and Policy Process: Case of Transgenic Sweet Potato in Kenya. Economic & Political Weekly, 37(26), 2770.
- Kameri-Mbote, P. (2002). The Development of Biosafety Regulation in Africa in the Context of the Cartagena Protocol: Legal and Administrative Issues. Review of European Community & International Environmental Law, 11(1), 62.
- Kameri-Mbote, P., & Cullet, P. (2002). Biological Diversity Management in Africa: Legal and Policy Perspectives in the run-up to WSSD. Review of European Community & International Environmental Law, 11(1), 38.
- Kameri-Mbote, P., & Lind, J. (2001). Improving Tools and Techniques for Crisis Management: The Ecological Sources of Conflict – Experiences from Eastern Africa. Romanian Journal of Political Science, 1(2).
- Kameri-Mbote, P., & Cullet, P. (1999). Agro-biodiversity and International Law – A Conceptual Framework. Journal of Environmental Law.
- Kameri-Mbote, P., & Cullet, P. (1998). Joint Implementation and Forestry Projects: Conceptual and Operational Fallacies. International Affairs, 74, 393.
- Kameri-Mbote, P., & Cullet, P. (1998). The Management of Genetic Resources: Developments in the 1997 Sessions of the Commission on Genetic Resources for Food and Agriculture. Colorado Journal of International Environmental Law & Policy (Yearbook), 78.
- Kameri-Mbote, P., & Cullet, P. (1997). Law, Colonialism and Environmental Management in Africa. Review of European Community & International Environmental Law, 6, 23.
- Kameri-Mbote, P., & Cullet, P. (1997). Activities Implemented Jointly in the Forestry Sector: Conceptual and Operational Fallacies. Georgetown International Environmental Law Review, 10, 97.
- Kameri-Mbote, P., & Cullet, P. (1996). Dolphin Bycatches in Tuna Fisheries: A Smokescreen Hiding the Real Issues? Ocean Development & International Law, 27, 333.
- Kameri-Mbote, P. (1995). Women as Victims of Crime. University of Nairobi Law Journal.
- Kameri-Mbote, P., & Sihanya, B. (1993). Intellectual Property Rights and Communication. Media Development: Journal of the World Association for Christian Communication, 40, 20–21.

Book Chapters

- Kameri-Mbote, P. (Forthcoming 2013). Climate Change, Law and Indigenous Peoples in Kenya. In Abate, R. S., & Kronk, E. A. (Eds.), Climate Change, Indigenous Peoples and the Search for Legal Remedies. Edward Elgar, London.
- Kameri-Mbote, P., & Odote, C. (2011). Avenues for Climate Change Litigation in Kenya. In Brunnée, J., Doelle, M., & Rajamani, L. (Eds.), Climate Change Liability: Transnational Law and Practice (pp. 296–318). Cambridge University Press, London.
- Kameri-Mbote, P., Hellum, A., & Nyamweya, P. (2011). Pathways to Real Access to Land-Related Resources for Women: Challenging and Overturning Dominant Legal Paradigms. In Tsanga, A., & Stewart, J. (Eds.), Women and Law: Innovative Regional Approaches to Teaching, Researching and Analysing Women and Law (North–South Legal Perspective Series No. 5, pp. 333–369). Weaver Press, Harare.
- Kameri-Mbote, P. (2010). Gender and International Environmental Governance. In Honkonen, T., & Couzens, E. (Eds.), University of Eastern Finland–UNEP Course Series 9 (pp. 137–161). University of Eastern Finland, Joensuu.
- Kameri-Mbote, P., & Kieyah, J. (2010). Securing Property Rights in Land in Kenya: Formal Versus Informal. In Adam, C., Collier, P., & Ndung’u, N. (Eds.), Kenya: Policies for Prosperity (pp. 309–328). Oxford University Press
- Kameri-Mbote, P., Odote, C., Musembi, C., & Kamande, M. (Forthcoming 2013). Ours by Right: Law, Politics and Realities of Community Property in Kenya. Strathmore University Legal Press.
- Brauch, H. G., Oswald Spring, Ú., Mesjasz, C., Grin, J., Kameri-Mbote, P., Chourou, B., Dunay, P., & Birkmann, J. (Eds.) (2010). Coping with Global Environmental Change, Disasters and Security – Threats, Challenges, Vulnerabilities and Risks. Hexagon Series on Human and Environmental Security and Peace, Vol. 5. Springer-Verlag, Berlin–Heidelberg–New York.
- Kameri-Mbote, P., Muteshi, J., & Ruto, S. (2009). Promises and Realities: Taking Stock of the 3rd UN International Women's Conference. African Women & Child Feature Service & Ford Foundation
