= Maria do Carmo Medina =

Portuguese Angolan human rights defender, lawyer and academic (1925–2014)

- Born: 7 December 1925; Lisbon
- Died: 10 February 2014 (aged 88); Lisbon
- Occupations: Judge, Professor of Law
- Years active: 1976 – 1997

Maria do Carmo Medina (7 December 1925 – 10 February 2014) was a Portuguese-born Angolan human rights defender, pro-Angola independence campaigner, academic, and the first female judge of Luanda Court of Appeal in Angola.

In 1956, at the age of 14, Medina emigrated to Angola following her inability to find a job in Portugal, due to damaging reports against her by the police. She became an Angolan citizen in 1976, a year after the country’s independence.

== Background and education ==
Medina was born in Lisbon and spent part of her childhood learning about native cultures and customs in cities such as Macau and Porto, where she finished at her Lyceum in 1938. She then enrolled to study law in Lisbon in the same year. In her first year at the faculty of law, she joined a minority group of anti-fascist students and later aligned with an opposition movement campaigning for free elections. The first time Medina was summoned to PIDE for questioning, she was still a minor. When she graduated in 1948, she was unable to secure employment due to negative reports against her by the Portuguese political police.

== Career ==
In April 1950, Medina left Portugal for Angola, where she acquired a teaching job at the Liceu Salvador Correia. Later that year, she registered as a lawyer with the Luanda Court of Appeal and became the first woman to open a law firm in Angola. At the court of appeals, she represented several Angolan political prisoners and was demoted to the lowest levels of civil service, filing petitions and administrative appeals to the colonial authorities and defending the property rights of Angolan families. Following Angolan independence in 1975, the government enlisted her to participate in the drafting of the fundamental laws of the country, including laws on nationality, civil, family, civil registration, administrative, and criminal law. Between November 1975 and September 1977, Medina served as Secretary for Legal Affairs of the Presidency of the People's Republic of Angola. In 1976, Medina adopted Angolan nationality and was appointed to the judiciary as a judge of the Civil Court of Luanda. In 1980, she became a judge at the Luanda Court of Appeal. In 1982, she worked as a graduate assistant at the Law Faculty of the Agostinho Neto University teaching family law, and rising to position of a professor in 1990.

She was the vice president of the Supreme Court of Angola in 1990. She was elected chairman of the General Assembly of the Association of Angolan Lawyers in 1990, and in 1995, she was elected chairman of the General Assembly of the Angolan Association of Women Lawyers. Medina retired as a judge of the Supreme Court of Angola in 1997.

== Death ==
Medina died of disease in Lisbon, on 10 February 2014 and was buried at Luanda's 'Altos das Cruzes' cemetery.
