= Martha Imalwa =

Prosecutor-General of Namibia since 2004

Prosecutor General of Namibia
- Incumbent
- Assumed office January 2004
- Appointed by: President Sam Nujoma
- Preceded by: John R. Walters

Personal details
- Born: Martha Ekandjo; 23 December 1960 (age 65)
- Party: SWAPO
- Education: University of Warwick
- Occupation: Prosecutor
- Profession: Advocate

Olivia Martha Imalwa (born Ekandjo on December 23, 1960) has been the Prosecutor General of Namibia since 2004.

Imalwa went into exile to Angola in 1982, studied and graduated with distinctions from United Nations Institute for Namibia in 1985 in Zambia. She went on to study LLB degree with honours in 1988 at the University of Warwick in the United Kingdom and returned to Namibia from exile in 1989. She served as co-ordinator for the Legal Assistance Centre after independence in March 1990 in Ongwediva before becoming a State Prosecutor in 1992 at Oshakati and subsequently serving as Control Prosecutor for the northern towns.

Martha Imalwa became State Advocate in the High Court of Namibia and was appointed as Deputy Prosecutor-General of Namibia in 2000 before being appointed in 2004 as Prosecutor-General of Namibia and was reappointed in the same position in 2013 by President Hifikepunye Pohamba.
