= Supreme Court of Justice (Cape Verde) =

Highest court of authority of Cape Verde

- Supremo Tribunal de Justiça
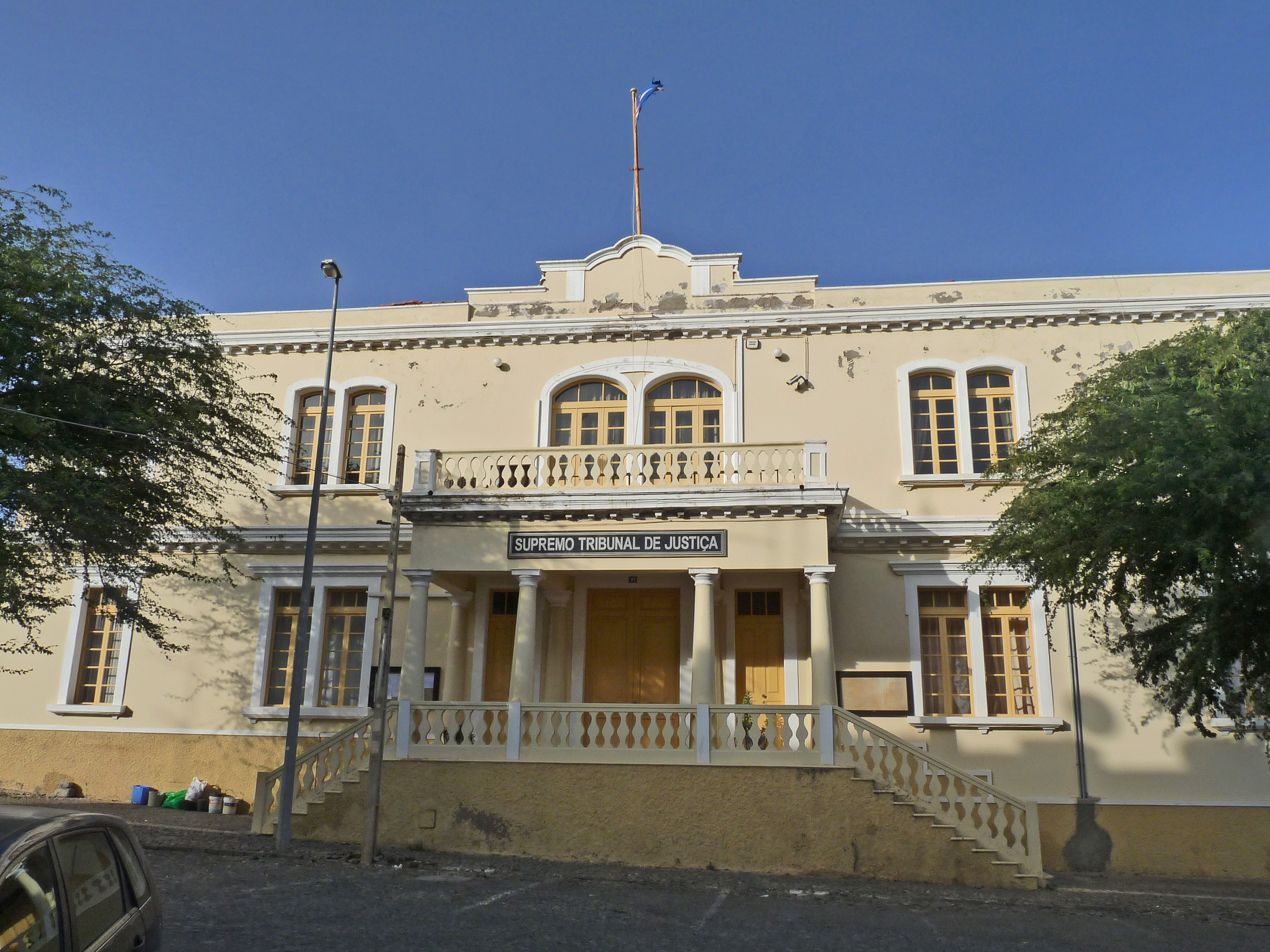
- Established: 1980 (1975)
- Jurisdiction: Cape Verde
- Authorised by: Cape Verde Constitution

President
- Currently: Benfeito Mosso Ramos

The Supreme Court of Justice is the apex court for civil, criminal and administrative matters in the hierarchy of Cape Verde's legal system.

The Court has its origins in the National Council of Justice that was established in July 1975 following Cape Verde's independence. With the promulgation of the 1980 constitution, the Court took its present name. The 1992 Constitution codified the Court's independence.

The President of the Court is appointed by the President of the Republic, from among the Court's member judges, after consultation with the Supreme Council of the Magistrates, the body tasked with the promotion, placement and discipline of the judiciary. The Court has a minimum of five members; one is appointed by the President, one by the Parliament and the remainder elected by the Supreme Council of the Magistrates.

In 2015, Maria de Fátima Coronel was appointed President of the Supreme Court of Justice. After her retirement in December 2020, Benfeito Mosso Ramos became interim president. He became full president in November 2022.
