= Biyémi Brigitte Brym =

Biyémi Brigitte Brym (born 1931), also known as Biyémi Brigitte Brym-Kekeh, is a Togolese lawyer and politician. In the early 1960s, she became the first female magistrate in Togo.

== Biography ==
Biyémi Brigitte Brym was born in Lomé, Togo, in 1931. She completed primary and secondary school in Lomé at what would become the Lycée Bonnecarrère.

Around 1960, Brym began practicing law and became the first female magistrate in Togo. She was also among the first magistrates to come from Togo, as at that time the majority of those practicing in the country were originally from France.

She later became the first woman to serve as president of the Judicial Chamber of the Supreme Court of Togo. She is also one of Togo's earliest female government ministers, having been appointed by President Gnassingbé Eyadéma as secretary of state for women's issues in the late 1970s.

In 1982, she was named a commander in the Togolese Order of Mono.
