= Alphonsine Cheusi =

Congolese judge

Alphonsine Kalume Asengo Cheusi (born 1955) is a Congolese magistrate who in October 2020 became the first woman to be selected as a member of the Constitutional Court of the Democratic Republic of the Congo. Until her appointment, all nine judges had always been male. Earlier in her career, in 2013 she became an advisor to the Supreme Court of Justice and in 2018, an advisor to the Council of State.

== Biography ==
Born on 9 May 1955 in Kalemie on Lake Tanganyika in southeastern DRC, she was raised in the province of Maniema. A graduate in economic law from the University of Kinshasa in 1983, in 1989 she was first appointed a magistrate before becoming a deputy prosecutor in Kinshasa's Kalamu Municipality. In 2013 she became an advisor to the Supreme Court and in 2018, an advisor to the Council of State. On 21 October 2020, she was sworn in as a member of the Constitutional Court.
