= Sangoma, South Africa =

Zanghoma Xitsonga
- Location within Limpopo Location within South Africa
- Coordinates: 23.920°S 30.335°E
- Country: South Africa
- Province: Limpopo
- District: Mopani
- Municipality: Greater Tzaneen
- Established: 1964

Area
  - Total: 1.09 km^{2} (0.42 sq mi)

Population (2001)
  - Total: 4,860
  - Density: 4,460/km^{2} (11,500/sq mi)
- Time zone: UTC+2 (SAST)

Zanghoma is a small village in Greater Tzaneen Local Municipality in the Limpopo province of South Africa.

The village produced influential and notable people, including the popular Academician, Author, Leadership guru, and International speaker, Dr. Professor Abraham Manase, who is also an international senior data management analyst and a professor at Westcliff University in California, USA. www.drmanase.com. Others are principal Lucas Mokoena, photographer Nkateko Manase, writer Shaun Mhlanga, Vongani Khumalo and Endlani Mlambo.

Zanghoma village is famous for being a Christian village.
