= ECOWAS Court =

Court of Justice of the Economic Community of West African States
- French: Cour de Justice de la Communauté économique des États de l'Afrique de l'Ouest; Portuguese: Tribunal de Justiça da Comunidade Económica dos Estados da África Ocidental
- Established: 2001
- Jurisdiction: ECOWAS member states
- Location: Abuja, Nigeria
- Judge term length: 4 years
- Number of positions: 5
- Website: www.courtecowas.org

President
- Currently: Hon. Justice Charlyne Brumskine

Vice-President
- Currently: Hon. Justice Désire Henri Aihou

Dean
- Currently: Hon. Justice Henrietta Uzoamaka Didigu

The ECOWAS Court of Justice is an organ of the Economic Community of West African States (ECOWAS), a regional integration community of 15 member states in Western Africa. It was created pursuant to the provisions of Articles 6 and 15 of the Revised Treaty of the Economic Community of West African States (ECOWAS).

== Constituting documents ==
Although ECOWAS was founded in 1975 by the Treaty of Lagos (ECOWAS Treaty), the Court of Justice was not created until the adoption of the Protocol on the Community Court of Justice in 1991. Additionally, the ECOWAS Revised Treaty of 1993 established the Court of Justice was an institution of ECOWAS. The Protocol was amended twice; once in 2005, and once in 2006. Notably, the 2005 Supplementary Protocol expanded the Court's jurisdiction to include human rights claims by individuals.

== Jurisdiction ==
The Court has jurisdiction over four general types of disputes: (1) those relating to the interpretation, application, or legality of ECOWAS regulations, (2) those that arise between ECOWAS and its employees, (3) those relating to liability for or against ECOWAS, and (4) those that involve a violation of human rights committed by a member state.

== Organization ==
=== Judges ===
Hon. Justice Charlyne M. Brumskine (Liberia), Hon. Justice Désire Henri Aihou (Bénin), Hon. Justice Henrietta Uzoamaka Didigu (Nigeria), Hon. Justice Yaouza Ouro-Sama (Togo) and Hon. Justice Awa Bah (The Gambia).

== Cases ==
The Court's docket has been limited, with no more than two dozen judgments rendered annually. However, since 2005, when the Court's jurisdiction was expanded to include human rights claims, the vast majority of cases decided by the Court concern human rights.
