= Linda Kasonde =

Zambian legal practitioner

- Occupation: Legal practitioner
- Known for: Advocacy of human rights

Linda Kasonde is a Zambian legal practitioner. She is recognized for her significant contributions to the legal field, as well as the advancement of human rights. Kasonde's accomplishments include her role as the Founder and Executive Director of the Chapter One Foundation, an organization dedicated to promoting and protecting civil liberties. Moreover, she is the proprietor of LCK Chambers. Kasonde was the first female President of the Law Association of Zambia (LAZ).

== Education ==
Kasonde obtained her LLB Law Degree from Leicester University in England in the year 2000. Thereafter, she was admitted to the Zambian Bar in 2001. She obtained her commercially biased Masters in Law (LLM) in 2007 from the University of Cape Town in South Africa. Linda Kasonde is also a 2013 alumnus of the Harvard Leadership in the 21st Century Executive Programme.

== Career ==
After being admitted to the Zambian Bar in 2001, Kasonde worked as an advocate at the National Legal Aid Clinic for Women and was subsequently hired by Mulenga Mundashi & Company in 2004. It was at that law firm that she later became the first woman in Zambia to be promoted to named partner in an established and internationally recognised law firm.

In April 2016, Kasonde was elected President of LAZ by the association's members during its fifth annual conference. Over the course of the next two years, she became a well-known figure in Zambia for using her public platform as LAZ president to resolutely defend constitutional democracy, civil liberties and the rule of law. In this role, she attracted occasional controversy as government representatives felt she was overly political, especially when drawing attention to allegations of constitutional violations by the ruling authorities.

A year after her election, in April 2017, Kasonde faced public pushback when Lusaka lawyer Kelvin Fube Bwalya filed a motion of no confidence in the LAZ Council under her leadership. Fube, a prominent member of the governing Patriotic Front, accused the Kasonde-led LAZ Council of having failed to effectively run the association and consequently called for its removal. At an Extraordinary General Meeting called to discuss the issue, Fube's proposal met strong opposition from other LAZ members present, a development that prompted him to withdraw the motion before voting could take place.

Kasonde stepped down as LAZ president in April 2018 following the conclusion of her term of office, although she was eligible to seek another. She returned to private practice and continues to be involved in civil society activities. She was elected as the Vice President of the Commonwealth Lawyers Association in 2019.

In September 2019 Kasonde launched the Civil Society Organisation, Chapter One Foundation. According to Linda Kasonde, Chapter One Foundation was born from the growing threat on Human rights, constitutionalism and the rule of law in Zambia.

== Awards ==
Kasonde was awarded the Epic Alumni for "Women Inspiring Women" at IE Business School. She also received the award of the Zambia Society for Public Administration's Justice Irene Chirwa Mambilima in 2016.
