= Qinisile Mabuza =

Liswati judge

Judge of the COMESA Court of Justice
- Incumbent
- Assumed office 2015
- Appointed by: King Mswati III

Personal details
- Profession: Attorney, Judge

Qinisile Mabuza is a Liswati judge, and was the first female judge appointed in Eswatini. She was also the first female attorney when she was appointed in 1978.

== Career ==
Qinisile Mabuza became the first female attorney in Eswatini when she was admitted in 1978, and went on to become the first female judge. In 2010, she oversaw a decision which gave Emaswati women equal rights in property ownership, saying that there had been sufficient time since the adoption of the Eswatini Constitution in 2005 "to embark on aggressive law reforms, especially those relating to women who have been marginalised over the years in many areas of the law". She was the only female Liswati judge at this time, although a second female judge has since been appointed. Mabuza was part of a fact finding team which travelled to Zambia on behalf of the International Court of Justice to investigate the circumstances around the suspension of three Judges there.

The Eswatini media reported in 2014 that Chief Justice Michael Ramodibedi had issued warrants for the arrest of three Judges, and had requested that police monitor the actions of Mabuza. This was denied, but said to be in response to their opposition of appointment of junior Judge Mpendulo Simelane. King Mswati III endorsed Mabuza as a representative on the Common Market for Eastern and Southern Africa (COMESA) Court of Justice in 2015. This was against the advice of Ramodibedi, who had instead pushed for Simelane to represent Eswatini at the court. Mabuza was subsequently voted as the head of the COMESA Court of First Instance in September 2016.

== See also ==
- First women lawyers around the world
