= Tahani al-Gebali =

Egyptian judge (1950–2022)

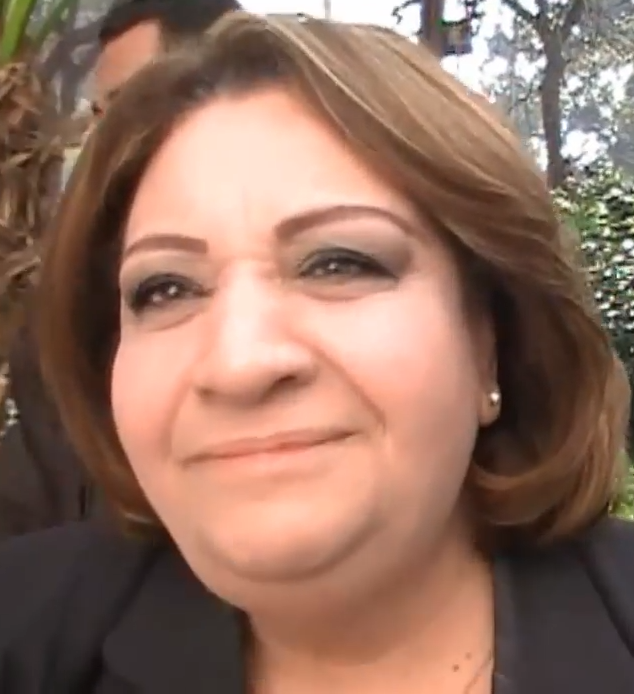
- Gebali in 2014
- Born: 20 November 1950; Tanta, Egypt
- Died: 9 January 2022 (aged 71); Cairo, Egypt
- Resting place: Tanta, Egypt
- Education: Cairo University
- Known for: First female justice in Egypt
- Political party: Independent

Tahani al-Gebali (Arabic: تهاني الجبالي; 20 November 1950 – 9 January 2022) was an Egyptian judge and a past Vice President of the Supreme Constitutional Court of Egypt.

== Biography ==
In 2003, she was appointed to office by President Hosni Mubarak, becoming the first woman to hold a judiciary position in Egypt, and she remained the only female on the bench until 32 other Egyptian women were appointed to various judicial positions in 2007.

In July 2012, The New York Times wrote that Supreme Constitutional Court Vice President Tahani al-Gebali advised the Supreme Council of the Armed Forces not to cede power to civilians until a constitution was written. This was denied by Judge al-Gebali, who announced she would sue the newspaper.

Al-Gebali died from COVID-19 on 9 January 2022, at the age of 71.

== See also ==
- List of first women lawyers and judges in Africa
