= Association Mauritanienne des Droits de l'Homme =

Mauritanian non-profit human rights organization

- الجمعية الموريتانية لحقوق الإنسان
- Abbreviation: AMDH
- Formation: 1991
- Purpose: Human rights
- Headquarters: Nouakchott
- Location: Mauritania
- President: MBAYE FATIMATA
- Vice President: SALL Djibril
- Treasurer: NDONGO OUMAR SEIKOU
- Secretary General: MBOW AMADOU
- Affiliations: FIDH
- Website: http://www.amdhrim.org

Association Mauritanienne des Droits de l'Homme (AMDH) (Arabic: الجمعية الموريطانية لحقوق الإنسان) is a Mauritanian non-profit human rights non-governmental organization founded in 1991 Mauritania. It is based in Nouakchott. As of 2006, its president is Fatimata Mbaye.

AMDH is a member of International Federation of Human Rights Leagues (FIDH).
