= 2020 Algerian constitutional referendum =

- 1 November 2020
- Do you agree with the draft revision of the Constitution which is proposed to you?

Results
Choice	Votes	%
Yes	3,356,091	66.80%
No	1,668,148	33.20%
Valid votes	5,024,239	88.74%
Invalid or blank votes	637,312	11.26%
Total votes	5,661,551	100.00%
Registered voters/turnout	24,466,618	23.14%

A constitutional referendum was held in Algeria on 1 November 2020. The subject of the referendum was a revision of the Algerian constitution, and it follows a series of protests known as Hirak.

An effort by President Abdelmadjid Tebboune to meet demands raised by the demonstrations that led to the resignation of four-term former President Abdelaziz Bouteflika in April 2019, the revised constitution aimed to reform the powers of the Algerian government.

== Background ==
On 16 February 2019, after four-term former President Abdelaziz Bouteflika announced his candidacy for a fifth term as the President of Algeria, protests erupted across the country, and while they remained largely peaceful, they led the Algerian military to strongly encourage Bouteflika to resign immediately. Bouteflika named a caretaker government on 31 March, and shortly after Algerian Army Chief of Staff Lieutenant General Ahmed Gaed Salah called on him to leave office two days later, he formally relinquished power.

Tensions towards Bouteflika arose in part out of public discontent with his 20-year record as president, which was often characterized by corruption and allegations of using state monopolies to finance systems of clientelism, and can also be traced back to a broader pattern of frustration with the powers of the Algerian government. Additionally, Bouteflika's health in regards to his ability to govern was consistently called into question after his stroke in 2013, where his frequent hospitalization and few public appearances led to the proliferation of rumors about his death.

The presidential election was held on 12 December 2019 despite widespread public opposition, and with 58.13% of valid votes in the first round, Abdelmadjid Tebboune was declared its winner. Unrest surrounded the election, however, and various protests across the country directly before 12 December called for a boycott of the election. The Rally for Culture and Democracy estimated an 8% turnout, but reports by the Algerian government placed the national turnout rate at 39.88%. Additionally, 1,200 protestors were detained by Algerian authorities in connection to protests of the election, and by later that December, the National Committee for the Liberation of Detainees (CNLD) estimated that 180 prisoners of conscience still remained in government custody.

On the eve of the first anniversary of the Hirak Movement, President Abdelmadjid Tebboune announced in a statement to the Algerian national media that 22 February would be declared the Algerian "National Day of Fraternity and Cohesion Between The People and Its Army For Democracy." In the same statement, Tebboune spoke in favor of the Hirak Movement, saying that "the blessed Hirak has preserved the country from a total collapse" and that he had "made a personal commitment to carry out all of the [movement's] demands." On 21 and 22 February 2020, masses of demonstrators (with turnout comparable to well-established Algerian holidays like the Algerian Day of Independence) gathered to honor the anniversary of the Hirak Movement and the newly established national day.

In an effort to contain the COVID-19 pandemic, Tebboune announced on 17 March 2020 that "marches and rallies, whatever their motives" would be prohibited. After protestors and journalists were arrested for participating in such marches, Tebboune faced accusations of attempting to "silence Algerians." Notably, the government's actions were condemned by Amnesty International, which said in a statement that "when all eyes [...] are on the management of the COVID-19 pandemic, the Algerian authorities are devoting time to speeding up the prosecution and trial of activists, journalists, and supporters of the Hirak movement." CNLD estimated that around 70 prisoners of conscience were imprisoned by 2 July 2020 and that several of the imprisoned were arrested for Facebook posts.

== Progression ==
On 28 December 2019 recently inaugurated President Tebboune met with Ahmed Benbitour, the former Algerian Head of Government, with whom he discussed the "foundations of the new Republic."

On 8 January 2020 Tebboune established a "commission of experts" composed of 17 members (a majority of which were professors of constitutional law) responsible for examining the previous constitution and making any necessary revisions. Led by Ahmed Laraba, the commission was required to submit its proposals to Tebboune directly within the following two months. In a letter to Laraba on the same day, Tebboune outlined seven axes around which the commission should focus its discussion. These areas of focus included strengthening citizens' rights, combatting corruption, consolidating the balance of powers in the Algerian government, increasing the oversight powers of parliament, promoting the independence of the judiciary, furthering citizens' equality under the law, and constitutionalizing elections. Tebboune's letter also included a call for an "immutable and intangible" two-term limit to anyone serving as president — a major point of contention in the initial Hirak Movement protests, which were spurred by former president Abdelaziz Bouteflika's announcement to run for a fifth term.

The preliminary draft revision of the constitution was publicly published on 7 May 2020, but the Laraba Commission (as the "commission of experts" came to be known) was open to additional proposals from the public until 20 June. By 3 June, the commission had received an estimated 1,200 additional public proposals. After all revisions were considered by the Laraba Commission, the draft was introduced to the Cabinet of Algeria (Council of Ministers).

On 4 July 2020 Tebboune announced that the referendum would occur in September or October 2020.

On 24 August 2020, the date for the referendum was set for 1 November, the anniversary of the start of Algeria's war of independence.

The revised constitution was adopted in the Council of Ministers on 6 September, in the People's National Assembly on 10 September, and Council of the Nation on 12 September, but its implementation was contingent on the results of the 1 November referendum.

== Proposed amendments ==
=== Parliamentary reforms ===
If passed, the new constitution would allow the president to appoint a prime minister if the president's political party holds a majority in parliament or a head of government if an alternate party holds a parliamentary majority. In either scenario, the prime minister or head of government would act as head of the executive branch in joint with the president but, unlike the president, could be removed by the People's National Assembly through a motion of no confidence. Upon appointment, this joint head of the executive branch would have 30 days to form a government (a process in parliamentary systems that includes appointing cabinet members). If unable to form a government, they would forfeit their position, and a new incumbent would be appointed. Articles 103-110 detail the full appointment process of the prime minister or head of government by the president.

Article 122 would set a maximum term limit for members of parliament at two terms, and Article 126 specifies that any members would only be afforded parliamentary immunity for acts related to the exercise of their functions.

The new constitution would not allow legislation by ordinance during parliamentary recess as is possible under the current version of the Algerian constitution.

=== Judicial reforms ===
The new constitution would replace the Algerian Constitutional Council with a Constitutional Court.

=== Executive reforms ===
The new constitution would retain the two-term limit on the presidency, but it would expand this restriction to encompass both consecutive and non-consecutive terms. The term of a resigning president would also be considered fully completed. Bouteflika was able to remain president for four terms even after the 2016 constitutional amendment that implemented term limits because the amendment stated that it would only apply to future presidents.

The initial draft provided for the possibility for the President of the Republic to appoint a vice-president, but this was removed in the final version of the constitution.

=== Other reforms ===
Under the proposed revision, the National Independent Electoral Authority (ANIE) would be constitutionalized in an effort to promote democracy, improve election security, and combat corruption.

Mention of the Hirak Movement would be included in the preamble to the constitution.

Military interventions would require a two-thirds majority in parliament and would take place under the supervision of the United Nations, the African Union, and the Arab League.

Referencing similar themes in the Algerian Constitution of 1989, the new constitution also reaffirms the government's commitment to the reinforcement of public rights and freedoms.

Dual citizens would be allowed to hold senior government positions from which they had previously been barred from under an article in the previous Algerian constitution.

== Reception and criticisms ==
Despite the proposed reforms, Tebboune and the Algerian government faced criticism that the revised constitution did not address many of the issues called into question by the Hirak Movement, especially the balance of powers.

=== Executive powers over parliament ===
If the constitution were passed, the president would still retain his ability to veto laws through two avenues:

1. Demanding a rereading of the law, which would then require a supermajority in parliament.
2. An indirect veto in the Council of the Nation, where one-third of its total members were appointed by Tebboune and a three-fourths majority is required to approve a bill.

Others worry that Tebboune's parliament will quickly transform into the Bouteflika's rubber-stamp parliament, which had lost general public approval because of little political discourse and an announcement of allegiance to Bouteflika himself.

The Algerian Parliament has historically struggled to garner a sense of respect from some Algerians, and it has faced significant corruption scandals in the past. Notably, a member of parliament alleged that seats in the assembly had been sold to some for approximately $540,000 (USD).

Others argue that some aspects of the proposed constitution are neither effective nor efficient in practice, and that specifically, the party majority in parliament required to appoint a prime minister is not feasible in a nation with often fractured political parties and ideologies.

=== Executive powers over the judiciary ===
The executive branch would retain its power to appoint judges to the judiciary without parliamentary approval, raising questions about its objectivity and ability to foster accountability.

=== Other executive powers ===
Under the new constitution, the president would be in control of all government regulatory bodies. Critics raise concerns that this, alongside other powers in the executive branch, parliament, and judiciary, would "give [him] the powers of an emperor."

== Results ==
As there was no minimum turnout required, the constitutional changes were approved, with 66.68% of voters participating in favour of the changes. Turnout was very low, with only around 23% of eligible voters participating. Additionally, over 10% of overall votes cast were invalid or blank.

Choice	Votes	%
For	3,356,091	66.80
Against	1,668,148	33.20
Total	5,024,239	100.00
Valid votes	5,024,239	88.74
Invalid/blank votes	637,312	11.26
Total votes	5,661,551	100.00
Registered voters/turnout	24,466,618	23.14
Source: Independent National Authority of Elections
