= Algerian Constitution of 1996 =

Constitution of Algeria
- Original title: (in Arabic) دستور 1996 الجزائري
- Ratified: 26 November 1996
- System: Semi-presidential, indivisible and people's democratic republic

Government structure
- Branches: Three (executive, legislature and judiciary)
- Chambers: Two (Council of the Nation and People's National Assembly)
- Executive: President-led cabinet; Prime minister as head of government responsible to the People's National Assembly
- Judiciary: Supreme Court which validates or not the form of the trial (respect of the different codes). Council of State is an administrative jurisdiction. Dispute Tribunal responsible for determining the competence between judicial and administrative order. Constitutional Council which can modify the legal provisions and therefore the case law used by the other entities
- Last amended: 2020
- Supersedes: Algerian Constitution of 1989

Full text
- Constitution of Algeria at Wikisource

The Algerian Constitution of 1996 was passed in a referendum in 1996. It is the fundamental law of Algeria. The constitution was amended in 2002, 2008, 2016., and 2020.

== History ==
The Algerian constitution was amended in 1996 to address years of sectarian strife. This violence started in January 1991, when Muslim groups began violently protesting in response to the cancellation of the first ever multiparty election of Algeria by the military junta, where the Islamic Salvation Front was expected to come out victorious. The Algerian military declared a state of emergency and adopted a "transitional rule" for the next few years. While violence had been simmering from January 1991 to the summer of 1995, Islamist groups started more actively fighting with the Algerian military in response to multiparty elections announced in November 1995. This clash led to the opposition parties of Algeria boycotting the election and assuring the election of Liamine Zeroual, the incumbent. Seeking to address the political conflict in Algeria, newly elected President Zeroual announced on 5 May 1996 that he would put in place a three-part plan to reform the Algerian Constitution and restore order to Algeria. These three parts were: generating nationwide interest and ideas through a conference in the summer of 1996, holding a referendum on the results of the conference at the end of 1996, and holding elections for the Algerian legislature in 1997. The referendum passed the new constitution on 28 November 1996, although opposition parties claimed a fraudulent election. While violence continued after the ratification of the new constitution, the Algerian economy improved and the World Bank loaned the Algerian government $656 million in 1997. The new constitution changed the form of the legislature to a bicameral system, banned political parties based on religion, gave more powers to the president, imposed presidential term limits of two terms lasting five years, and included Islam as the official religion of Algeria.

== Amendments ==
The 1996 Constitution was revised in 2002 and 2008. In February 2016, the Parliament adopted a third constitutional revision which entered into force on March 6, 2016.

On May 7, 2020, the preliminary draft revision of the Constitution is published. It provides for the replacement of the post of Prime Minister by that of head of government, responsible to the Assembly, which can overthrow it by a motion of censure, the possibility for the President of the Republic to appoint a vice-president, the replacement of the Constitutional Council by a Constitutional Court, the retention of the limit on the number of presidential mandates to two, consecutive or not, or the limitation of the mandate of deputy to one re-election. In addition, the Hirak is inscribed in the preamble of the Constitution and the army is authorized to participate in theaters of operation abroad. Finally, the National Independent Election Authority (ANIE) is constitutionalised, the presidential third of the Council of Nation is abolished and the possibility of legislating by ordinance during parliamentary recess is abrogated.

== See also ==
- History of the Algerian Constitution
