= Constitutional Court (Algeria) =

Highest judicial body in Algeria

- المحكمة الدستورية
- Interactive map of Constitutional Court
- Established: 1 November 2020
- Composition method: Constitutional court
- Authorised by: Constitution of Algeria
- Number of positions: 12
- Website: cour-constitutionnelle.dz

President of the Constitutional Court
- Currently: Leïla Aslaoui
- Since: 19 June 2025

The Constitutional Court (Arabic: المحكمة الدستورية, romanized: al-Maḥkamah al-Dustūrīyah) of Algeria is Algeria's highest judicial body. It replaced the Constitutional Council by the Algerian constitutional amendment of 2020 approved by referendum. This revision of the Algerian constitution follows a series of protests known as Hirak.

== Current members ==
Members of the Constitutional Court of Algeria
Name	Position	Term	Appointed by
Leïla Aslaoui	President	19 June 2025–present	Abdelmadjid Tebboune
Bahri Saadallah		19 June 2025–present	Abdelmadjid Tebboune
Mesbah Menas		19 June 2025–present	Abdelmadjid Tebboune
Djilali Miloudi		19 June 2025–present	Abdelmadjid Tebboune
Amal Eddine Boulenouar		19 June 2025–present	Abdelmadjid Tebboune
Fatiha Benabbou		19 June 2025–present	Abdelmadjid Tebboune
Abdelouaheb Khrif		19 June 2025–present	Abdelmadjid Tebboune
Abbas Ammar		19 June 2025–present	Abdelmadjid Tebboune
Abdelhafidh Oussoukine		19 June 2025–present	Abdelmadjid Tebboune
Omar Boudiaf		19 June 2025–present	Abdelmadjid Tebboune
Mohamed Boufertas		19 June 2025–present	Abdelmadjid Tebboune

== See also ==
- Supreme Court of Algeria
- Constitutional Council (Algeria)
