= 1962 Algerian Constituent Assembly election and referendum =

- 20 September 1962
- All 196 seats in the Constituent Assembly; 99 seats needed for a majority
- Turnout: 83.79%
Party	Leader	Seats	+/–
National Liberation Front	Ahmed Ben Bella	196	New
This lists parties that won seats. See the complete results below.

A referendum on the establishment of a Constituent Assembly and an election to the Assembly was held in Algeria on 20 September 1962. Voters voted on a single question of whether they supported the formation of the Assembly based on a draft law, including the election of a single list of 196 National Liberation Front candidates to the Assembly.

The Assembly was to have a one-year mandate to draw up and promulgate a constitution. Of the 196 National Liberation Front candidates, 180 were Arabs and 16 were of European origin.

The vote was initially scheduled for 20 August, before being postponed until 2 September, and then 20 September.

The question put to voters was "Do you want the Assembly elected today to be constituted in accordance with the draft law appended to Ordinance No. 62-011 of July 17, 1962 relating to the powers and duration of the powers of the National Assembly?"

A reported 99.6% voted in favour, with a turnout of 84%.

== Results ==
Choice	Votes	%	Seats
For	5,267,324	99.65	196
Against	18,680	0.35	–
Total	5,286,004	100.00	196
Valid votes	5,286,004	99.69	
Invalid/blank votes	16,290	0.31	
Total votes	5,302,294	100.00	
Registered voters/turnout	6,328,415	83.79	
Source: Nohlen et al.

== Aftermath ==
The constitution was approved in a referendum in September 1963, and the mandate of the Assembly was extended by a year in accordance with article 77. However, President Ahmed Ben Bella froze the Assembly's activities and assumed full powers on 3 October 1963.
