= Constitutional Council (Algeria) =

Algerian judicial body

The Constitutional Council (المجلس الدستوري) of Algeria was an Algerian judicial body from 1963 to November 2021.

In accord of article 182 of Algerian Constitution after Algerian constitutional amendment of 2016, it was composed of 12 members appointed for a single term of eight years.

He ensured the regularity of national elections and referendums. It charged with reviewing statutes' constitutionality.

It was replaced in November 2021 by a Constitutional Court provided for by the Algerian constitutional amendment of 2020 approved by referendum. This revision of the Algerian constitution follows a series of protests known as Hirak Movement.

== See also ==
- Supreme Court of Algeria
- Constitutional Court (Algeria)
