= HIV/AIDS in Algeria =

Health concern in Algeria

Algeria has one of the lowest HIV/AIDS prevalence rates in Africa. In 2022, the United Nations estimated that there were 10,000 adults and children living with the disease in the country, accounting for 0.05% of the total population.https://www.unaids.org/en/regionscountries/countries/algeria

== Prevalence ==
HIV/AIDS was first identified in Sétif in 1986. Around 5000 Algerians have died of AIDS-related complications since the epidemic began.

During the early years of the epidemic, national understanding of the disease was low, which led to a likely discrepancy in the number of Algerians contracting HIV/AIDS with the number of reported cases. The traditionally conservative culture often meant that discussing the disease, either publicly or privately, was considered a social taboo.

The World Health Organization has identified drug users, sex workers and men who have sex with men as being the key populations among whom the HIV/AIDS epidemic is concentrated.

The number of women infected with HIV/AIDS has sharply increased, with the ratio of men to women having contracted the disease changing from 5:1 at the beginning of the epidemic to 1:1 by 2004. This has been attributed to the prevalence of married Algerian men having extra-marital affairs, contracting HIV/AIDS and subsequently transmitting it to their wives.

Subtype B is the most common type of HIV in northern Algeria, accounting for 56% of cases. There is more variety of strains in southern Algeria, which has been linked to its closer proximity with sub-Saharan countries where HIV/AIDS is more prevalent.

== National response ==
On 1 December 2003, then-President of Algeria Abdelaziz Bouteflika made a speech commemorating World AIDS Day, marking the first time he had extensively discussed HIV/AIDS. He stressed the importance of breaking the cultural taboo around discussing the disease, in addition to raising public awareness about HIV/AIDS, its transmission, symptoms, testing, and treatment; addressing women's social vulnerability to contacting the disease; the importance of maintaining confidentiality within the health service; and addressing the disease in a culturally appropriate way.

The Algerian government's subsequent response to the HIV/AIDS epidemic has been praised by the Joint United Nations Programme on HIV/AIDS, which described the country as a "pioneer in the region" for its prioritisation of cross-sectoral action, community involvement, and innovative policies, which it said had led to a sustained low-level epidemic. Universal health care is enshrined in the Constitution of Algeria, and free antiviral therapy has been offered to patients since 1998.

In 2012, Algeria partnered with UNAIDS to build the first HIV/AIDS research centre in the Middle East and North Africa, to be based in Tamanrasset, close to the country's borders with several countries and on a popular route for migrants. As of 2016, all health centres in Algeria have HIV/AIDS testing facilities, with the Algiers Centre of Excellence for Research on Health and HIV/AIDS serving as a regional hub for research, training, and medicine production pertaining to HIV/AIDS.

In 2016, the Algiers Declaration was signed, vowing to eradicate HIV/AIDS in North Africa and the Middle East by promoting increased testing and treatment, particularly among drug users, sex workers, and men who have sex with men.

The role of non-governmental organisations such as Solidarité AIDS and El-Hayat have been attributed to Algeria's response to the epidemic. This has included completing outreach work with vulnerable groups, such as offering condoms and testing to licensed sex workers.

== Difficulties in treatment ==
While the overall prevalence of HIV/AIDS is low in Algeria, public understanding of the disease and how it is transmitted has been described as "mediocre" among the population, particularly among young people. While it is taught as part of secondary education, access to HIV/AIDS services like testing, treatment and advice is only available to people under 18 with parental consent. The stigmatisation of people with HIV/AIDS has led to some parents not consenting, as well as to adults with the disease declining testing or antiretroviral drugs.
