= Leïla Aslaoui =

Algerian judge and politician (born 1945)

- ليلى عسلاوي

President of the Constitutional Court of Algeria
- Incumbent
- Assumed office 22 June 2025; Acting: 22 June 2025–8 July 2025
- Preceded by: Omar Belhaj

Judge of the Constitutional Court of Algeria
- Incumbent
- Assumed office November 2021

Personal details
- Born: 2 September 1945 (age 80) Algiers, Algeria
- Education: University of Algiers 1

Leïla Aslaoui (Arabic: ليلى عسلاوي; born 2 September 1945) is an Algerian judge and politician. She was one of the first female judges in Algeria and became the first woman president of the Constitutional Court of Algeria in 2025. Between 1991 and 1992 she served as Minister of Youth and Sports.

== Early life and education ==
Aslaoui was born on 2 September 1945 in Algiers, Algeria. Her father died when she was seven years old. She graduated from the Higher National School Of Political Sciences in 1967 and studied law and obtained a master’s degree from the University of Algiers 1.

== Career ==
Aslaoui began her judicial career as one of the first female judges in Algeria, and worked at the Court of Algiers and the Supreme Court. In 1989 Aslaoui was named aide to the Minister of Justice. Between 1991 and 1992, she served as Minister for Youth and Sport in the emergency cabinet of Sid Ahmed Ghozali. During the Algerian Civil War, Aslaoui received death threats and remained opposed to any dialogue with the Islamist rebel groups or their political representatives. She subsequently served as State Secretary to the Ministry for Foreign Affairs, with responsibility for National Solidarity and the Family. Following negotiations with those released from prison in September 1994, Aslaoui resigned, stating that the initiative was “immoral and politically unacceptable”. Aslaoui founded an association for victims of terrorism after her husband's murder in 1994 and became an activist against terrorism and Islamic extremism, giving lectures around the world and publishing several books.

Following Abdelaziz Bouteflika’s rise to power in 1999, she opposed his policy of national reconciliation and amnesty and rejected Bouteflika’s bid for a second term following the 2004 presidential election. After Bouteflika’s downfall, Aslaoui returned to public office, first in the Council of the Nation and then on the Constitutional Court, where she was appointed justice in November 2021.

After Omar Belhaj’s resignation as president of the Constitutional Court for personal reasons on 19 June 2025, Aslaoui presided over the judicial session that day to assess the vacancy and was appointed acting president on 22 June as the senior judge. She was formally appointed as president on 8 July 2025 by President of Algeria Abdelmadjid Tebboune.

== Personal life ==
In the midst of the civil war, on 17 October 1994, her husband was stabbed to death whilst working at his dental surgery.
