= Prime minister =

Top minister of cabinet and government

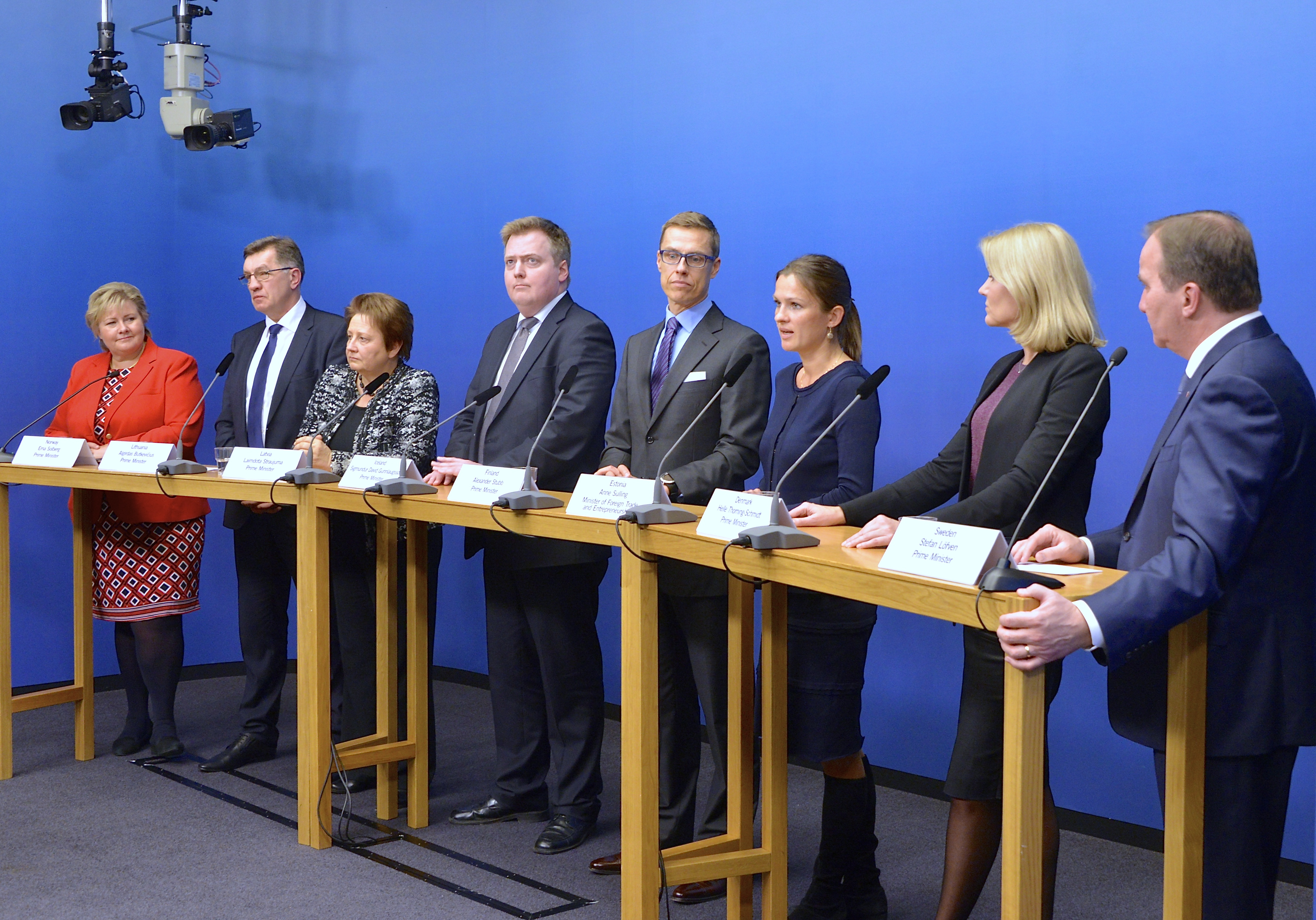
Prime ministers of the Nordic and Baltic countries in 2014. From left: Erna Solberg, Norway; Algirdas Butkevičius, Lithuania; Laimdota Straujuma, Latvia; Sigmundur Davíð Gunnlaugsson, Iceland; Alexander Stubb, Finland; Anne Sulling, Estonia (trade minister); Helle Thorning-Schmidt, Denmark; Stefan Löfven, Sweden.

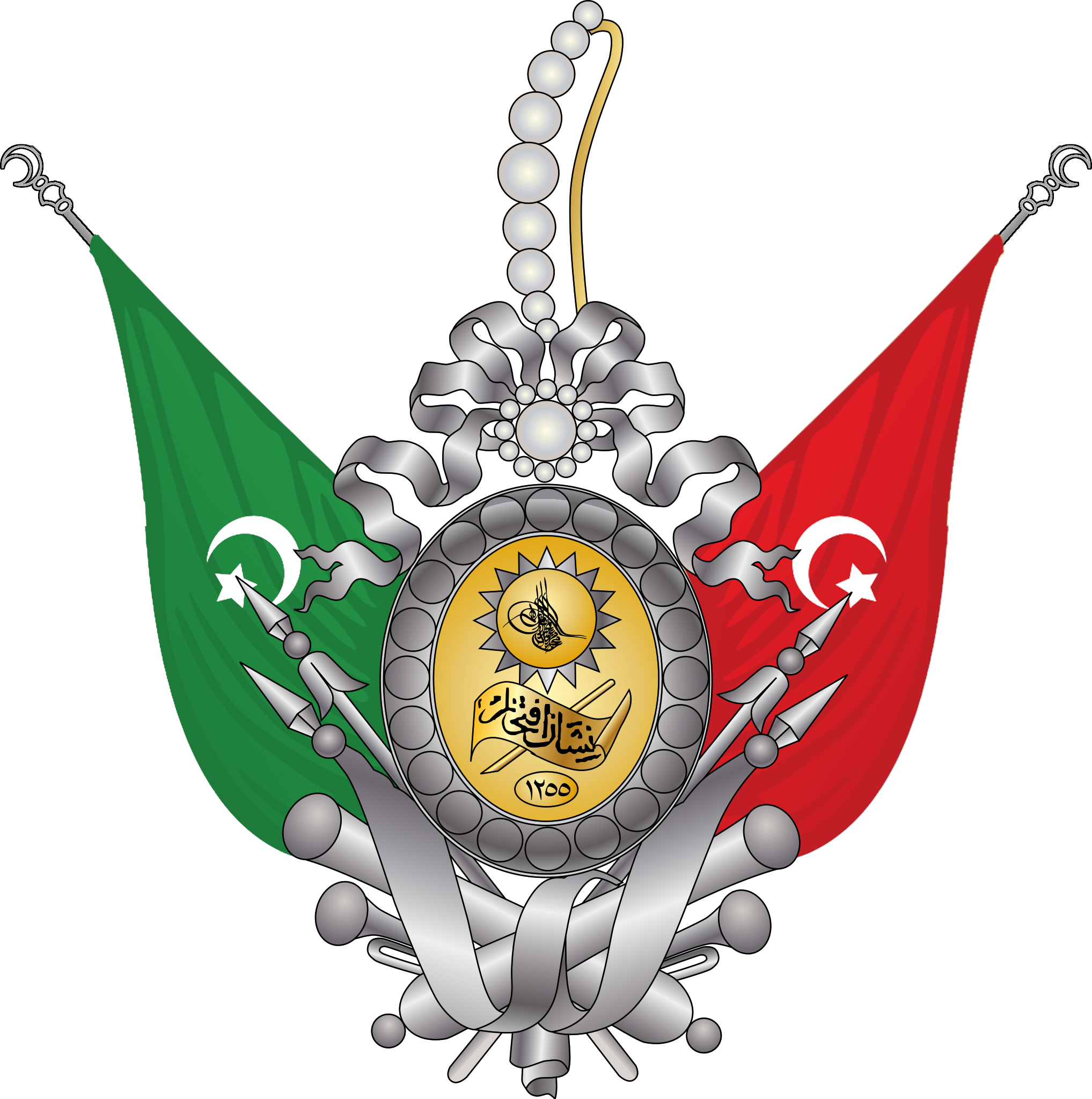
Seal of the Ottoman Grand Vizier

A prime minister, also known as a chief of cabinet, chief minister, first minister, minister-president or premier, is the head of the cabinet and the leader of the ministers in the executive branch of government, often in a parliamentary or semi-presidential system. A prime minister is not the head of state, but rather the head of government, serving as the chief of the executive under either a monarch or a president in a republican form of government.

In parliamentary systems of government (be they constitutional monarchies or parliamentary republics), the Prime Minister (or occasionally a similar post with a different title, such as the Chancellor of Germany) is the most powerful politician and the functional leader of the state, by virtue of commanding the confidence of the legislature. The head of state is typically a ceremonial officer, though they may exercise reserve powers to check the Prime Minister in unusual situations.

Under some presidential systems, such as South Korea and Peru, the prime minister is the leader or the most senior member of the cabinet, but not the head of government. As such, in South Korea, the prime minister is equivalent to that of a vice president which is the second in-command and assumes the presidency in the absence of the president.

In many systems, the prime minister selects and may dismiss other members of the cabinet, and allocates posts to members within the government. In most systems, the prime minister is the presiding member and chairman of the cabinet. In a minority of systems, notably in semi-presidential systems, a prime minister is the official appointed to manage the civil service and execute the directives of the head of state.

Today, the prime minister is often, but not always, a member of the legislature or its lower house, and is expected with other ministers to ensure the passage of bills through the legislature. In some monarchies the monarch may also exercise executive powers (known as the royal prerogative) without the approval of parliament.

As well as being head of government, being prime minister may require holding other roles or posts—the prime minister of the United Kingdom, for example, is also First Lord of the Treasury and Minister for the Civil Service. (Note: The posts of Prime Minister and First Lord of the Treasury are separate and need not be held by the one person, though the last prime minister not to be First Lord of the Treasury was Lord Salisbury at the turn of the 20th century. 10 Downing Street is actually the First Lord's residence, not the prime minister's. As Salisbury was not First Lord, he had to live elsewhere as prime minister.) In some cases, prime ministers may choose to hold additional ministerial posts (e.g. when the portfolio is critical to that government's mandate): during the Second World War Winston Churchill was also Minister of Defence (although there was then no Ministry of Defence). Another example is the Thirty-fourth government of Israel (2015–2019), when Benjamin Netanyahu at one point served as the prime minister and minister of Communications, Foreign Affairs, Regional Cooperation, Economy, Defense and Interior.

== Etymology ==
The term "prime minister" is attested in 17th century sources referring to Cardinal Richelieu, after he was named premier ministre to head the French royal council in 1624. The title was used alongside the principal ministre d'État ("chief minister of the state") more as a job description. After 1661, Louis XIV and his descendants refused to allow one of their Ministers to be more important than the others, so the term was no longer in use.

In the 18th century in the United Kingdom, members of parliament disparagingly used the title in reference to Sir Robert Walpole (whose official title was First Lord of the Treasury). During the whole of the 18th century, Britain was involved in a prolonged conflict with France, periodically bursting into all-out war, and Britons took outspoken pride in their "Liberty" as contrasted to the "Tyranny" of French Absolute Monarchy; therefore, being implicitly compared with Richelieu was no compliment to Walpole. Over time, however, the title became honorific and remains so in the 21st century.

== History ==
=== Origins ===
The position of a head of government separate from the head of state, or as the most important government administrator or minister after the monarch in rank developed in multiple countries separate from each other. The names given could be "prime minister", although other terms were also used such as "chief minister", "grand chancellor", "chancellor", "grand vizier", "counselor", and others.

The literal title itself can be traced back to the Abbasid caliphate and the Ottoman Empire. They both had an official title of Grand Vizier simply the Head of the Government which is called Prime Minister nowadays. The Grand Vizier was the most powerful person after sultan but sometimes the Grand Vizier of Ottoman Empire was more powerful than sultan himself. The position of Chancellor is the same or comparable in some countries as a prime minister, even if the label is different. The term goes back to ancient Roman times as head of the chancellery. This title as head of government or the administration existed in ancient China as Grand Chancellor (Chinese: 宰相; pinyin: Zǎixiàng), sometimes translated as "prime minister", existed since 685 BCE and ancient Japan Chancellor of the Realm (太政大臣 Daijō-daijin) since the 7th century CE. In the Holy Roman Empire the position of Archchancellor was the highest dignitary and traces to 860 CE, out of which later derived the positions of head of government such as the modern Chancellor of Germany, who is head of the federal government and an executive prime minister.

The power of these ministers depended entirely on the personal favour of the monarch. Although managing the parliament was among the necessary skills of holding high office, they did not depend on a parliamentary majority for their power. Although there was a cabinet, it was appointed entirely by the monarch, and the monarch usually presided over its meetings.

The monarch could dismiss the minister at any time, or worse: Cromwell was executed and Clarendon driven into exile when they lost favour. Kings sometimes divided power equally between two or more ministers to prevent one minister from becoming too powerful. Late in Anne's reign, for example, the Tory ministers Harley and Viscount Bolingbroke shared power.

=== Development ===
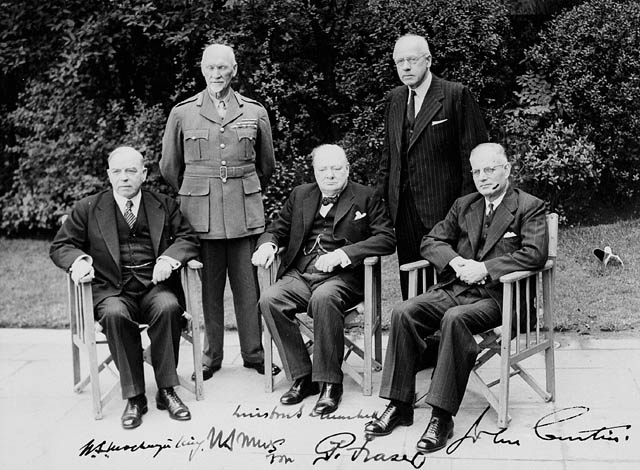
The prime ministers of five members of the Commonwealth of Nations at the 1944 Commonwealth Prime Ministers' Conference.

In the mid 17th century, after the English Civil War (1642–1651), Parliament strengthened its position relative to the monarch then gained more power through the Glorious Revolution of 1688 and passage of the Bill of Rights in 1689. The monarch could no longer establish any law or impose any tax without its permission and thus the House of Commons became a part of the government. It is at this point that a modern style of prime minister begins to emerge.

A tipping point in the evolution of the prime ministership came with the death of Anne in 1714 and the accession of George I to the throne. George spoke no English, spent much of his time at his home in Hanover, and had neither knowledge of, nor interest in, the details of British government. In these circumstances it was inevitable that the king's first minister would become the de facto head of the government.

From 1721, this was the Whig politician Robert Walpole, who held office for twenty-one years. Walpole chaired cabinet meetings, appointed all the other ministers, dispensed the royal patronage and packed the House of Commons with his supporters. Under Walpole, the doctrine of cabinet solidarity developed. Walpole required that no minister other than himself have private dealings with the king, and also that when the cabinet had agreed on a policy, all ministers must defend it in public, or resign. As a later prime minister, Lord Melbourne, said, "It matters not what we say, gentlemen, so long as we all say the same thing."

Walpole always denied that he was "prime minister", and throughout the 18th century parliamentarians and legal scholars continued to deny that any such position was known to the Constitution. George II and George III made strenuous efforts to reclaim the personal power of the monarch, but the increasing complexity and expense of government meant that a minister who could command the loyalty of the Commons was increasingly necessary. The long tenure of the wartime prime minister William Pitt the Younger (1783–1801), combined with the mental illness of George III, consolidated the power of the post. The title "prime minister" was first referred to on government documents during the administration of Benjamin Disraeli but did not appear in the formal British Order of precedence until 1905.

The prestige of British institutions in the 19th century and the growth of the British Empire saw the British model of cabinet government, headed by a prime minister, widely copied, both in other European countries and in British colonial territories as they developed self-government. In some places alternative titles such as "premier", "chief minister", "first minister of state", "president of the council" or "chancellor" were adopted, but the essentials of the office were the same.

=== Modern usage ===
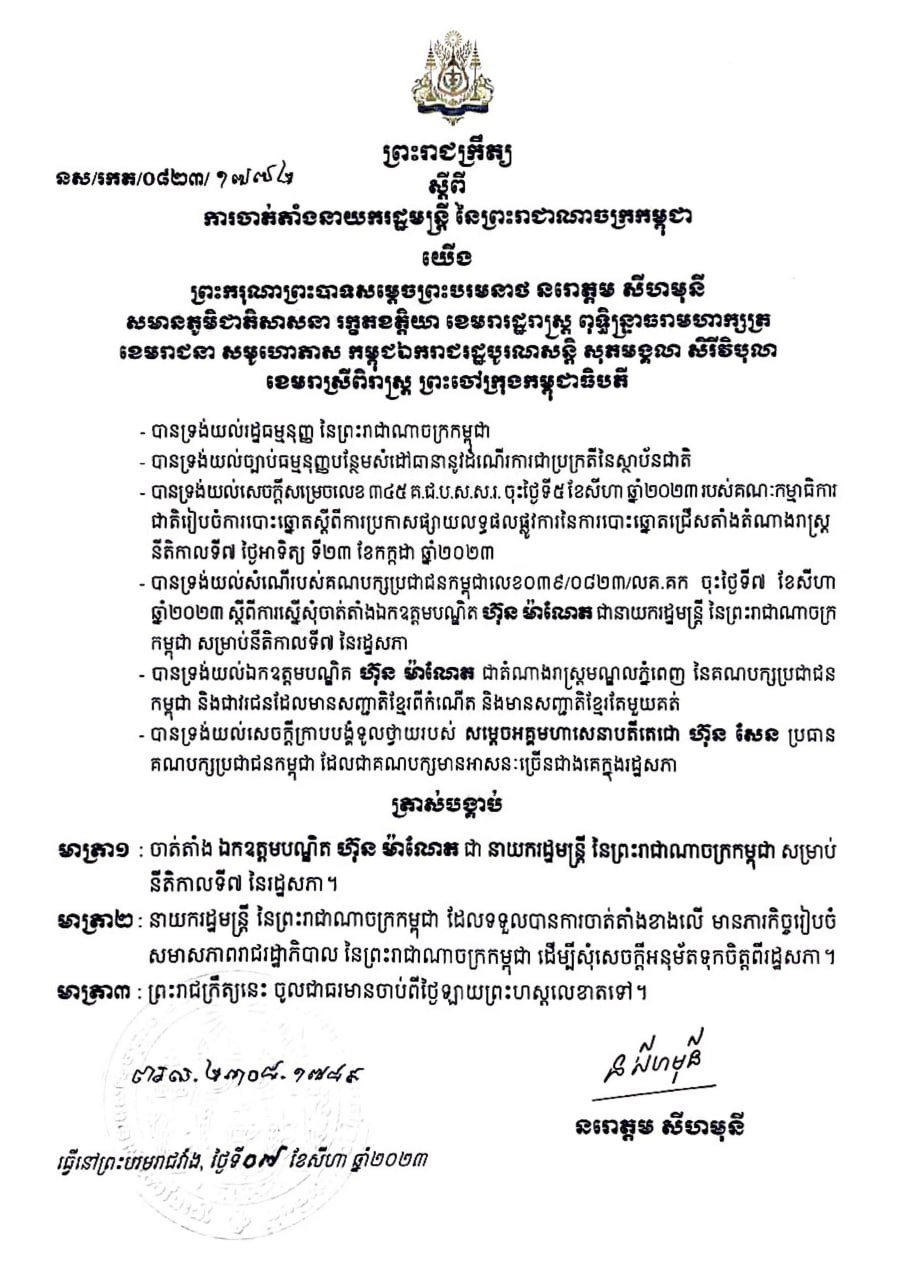
Royal decree appointing the Prime Minister of Cambodia in 2023

In the late 20th century, many of the world's countries had prime ministers or equivalent ministers, holding office under either constitutional monarchies or ceremonial presidents. The main exceptions to this system include Switzerland and the United States, as well as the presidential republics in Latin America, such as Chile and Mexico, modelled on the U.S. system in which the president directly exercises executive authority.

Bahrain's former prime minister, Sheikh Khalifah bin Sulman Al Khalifah, occupied the post for about 50 years, from 1970 to November 2020, making him the longest serving non-elected prime minister.

== Overview of the office ==
=== In monarchies and in republics ===
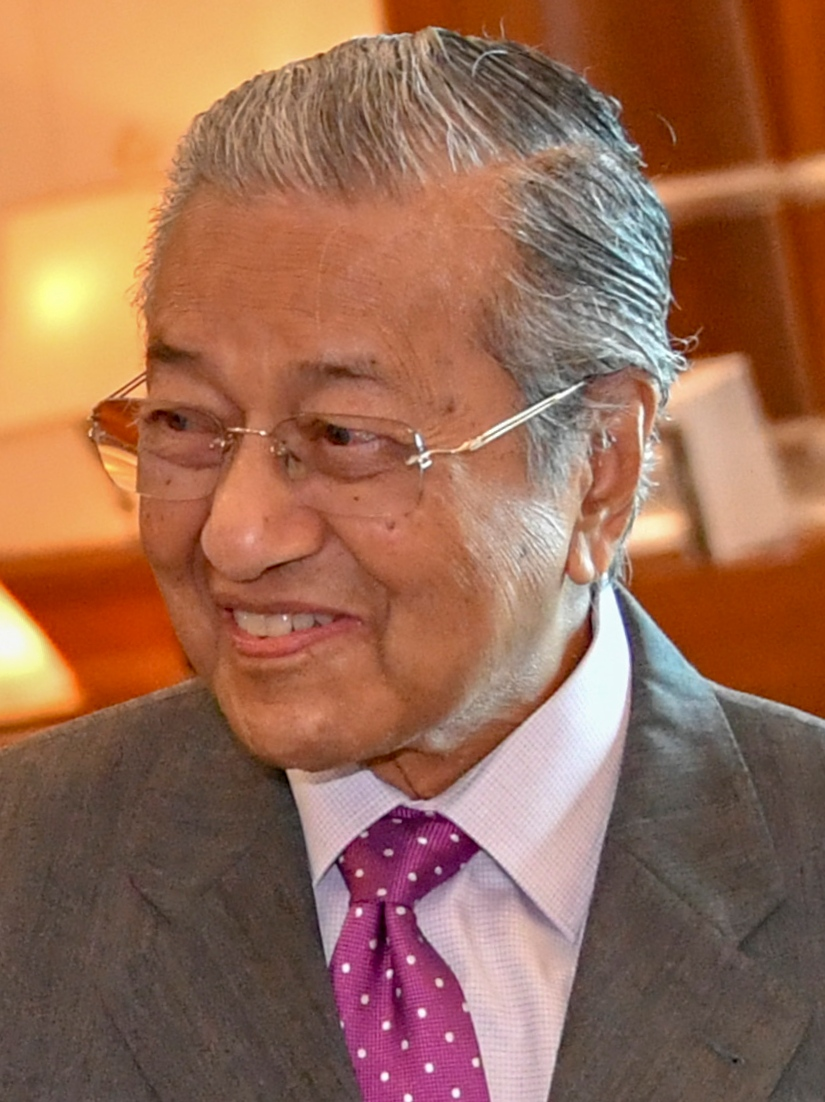
Mahathir Mohamad, the Prime Minister of Malaysia for over 24 years (1981–2003, 2018–2020), is known for his role in modernizing the country's economy.

The post of prime minister may be encountered both in constitutional monarchies (such as Belgium, Denmark, Japan, Luxembourg, the Netherlands, Norway, Malaysia, Morocco, Spain, (Note: Although the roles of the Spanish head of government coincide with the definition of a 'prime minister', in Spain the position is in fact referred to as 'the Presidency of the Government'.) Sweden, Thailand, Canada, Australia, New Zealand, and the United Kingdom) and in parliamentary republics, in which the head of state is an elected official (such as Bangladesh, Finland, the Czech Republic, France, Greece, Hungary, India, Indonesia (1945–66), Ireland, Nigeria (1960–66), Pakistan, Montenegro, Croatia, Bulgaria, Romania, Serbia, Turkey (1923–2018) and Italy). See also "First Minister", "Premier", "Chief Minister", "Chancellor", "Taoiseach", "Minister of State (Statsminister)", "President of the Government", "President of the Council of Ministers" and "Secretary of State": alternative titles usually equivalent in meaning to, or translated as, "prime minister". Both Indonesia and Nigeria lost their positions as prime ministers in 1966. Brazil, Iran, the Philippines and Turkey also lost their positions as prime ministers. Chile, Mexico, Switzerland and the United States never had positions as prime ministers.

This contrasts with the presidential system, in which the president (or equivalent) is both the head of state and the head of the government. In some presidential and all semi-presidential systems, such as those of Algeria, Argentina, China, France, Poland, Russia, South Korea or Ukraine, the prime minister is an official generally appointed by the president but usually approved by the legislature and responsible for carrying out the directives of the president and managing the civil service. The premier of the Republic of China (Taiwan) is also appointed by the president but does not require any approval by the legislature.

Appointment of the prime minister of France does not require any approval by the parliament either, but the parliament may force the resignation of the government. In these systems, it is possible for the president and the prime minister to be from different political parties if the legislature is controlled by a party different from that of the president. When it arises, such a state of affairs is usually referred to as (political) cohabitation.

=== Entry into office ===
In parliamentary systems a prime minister may enter into office by several means.

- The head of state appoints a prime minister, of their personal choice: Example: France, where the president has the power to appoint the prime minister of their choice, though the National Assembly can force a government to resign, they cannot nominate or appoint a new candidate.

While in practice most prime ministers under the Westminster system (including Australia, Canada, New Zealand, Malaysia, India and the United Kingdom) are the leaders of the largest party or coalition in parliament, technically the appointment of the prime minister is de jure exercised by the head of state.

- The head of state appoints a prime minister who has a set timescale within which they must gain a vote of confidence: Example: Italy, Romania
- The head of state appoints a formateur from among the members of Parliament, who then has a set timescale within which they must form a cabinet, and receive the confidence of Parliament after presenting the Cabinet Composition and Legislative Program to Parliament, and the formateur becomes prime minister once approved by parliament: Example: Israel
- The head of state appoints the leader of the political party with the majority of the seats in the parliament as prime minister. If no party has a majority, then the leader of the party with a plurality of seats is given an exploratory mandate to receive the confidence of the parliament within three days. If this is not possible, then the leader of the party with the second highest seat number is given the exploratory mandate. If this fails, then the leader of the third largest party is given it and so on: Example: Greece, see Prime Minister of Greece
- The head of state nominates a candidate for prime minister who is then submitted to parliament for approval before appointment as prime minister: Example: Spain, where the King sends a nomination to parliament for approval. Also Germany where under the German Basic Law (constitution) the Bundestag votes on a candidate nominated by the federal president. In the Philippines under the 1973 Constitution as amended after martial law, the prime minister was elected by the Batasang Pambansâ (Legislature) upon nomination by the president. In these cases, parliament can choose another candidate who then would be appointed by the head of state (or, in the case of the Philippines, outright elect that candidate).
- Parliament nominates a candidate who the head of state is then constitutionally obliged to appoint as prime minister: Example: Ireland, where the president appoints the Taoiseach on the nomination of Dáil Éireann. Also Japan, Thailand.
- Election by the legislature: Example: Solomon Islands and Vanuatu. Also the Philippines under the unamended 1973 Constitution, where the prime minister was supposed to be elected by the Batasang Pambansâ; these provisions were never used because the Philippines was under martial law at the time.
- Direct election by popular vote: Example: Israel, 1996–2001, where the prime minister was elected in a general election, with no regard to political affiliation.
- Nomination by a state office holder other than the head of state or their representative: Example: Under the modern Swedish Instrument of Government, the power to appoint someone to form a government has been moved from the monarch to the speaker of the parliament and the parliament itself. The speaker nominates a candidate, who is then elected to prime minister (statsminister) by the parliament if an absolute majority of the members of parliament does not vote no (i.e. the candidate can be elected to the post even if more MP:s vote no than yes).

=== Exit from office ===
In older, convention-based parliamentary systems, prime ministers are not appointed for a specific term in office and in effect may remain in power through a number of elections and parliaments. For example, Margaret Thatcher was only ever appointed prime minister on one occasion, in 1979. She remained continuously in power until 1990, though she used the assembly of each House of Commons after a general election to reshuffle her cabinet.

Newer parliamentary systems that operate based on a codified constitution, however, do have a term of office of the prime minister linked to the period in office of the parliament. Hence, for example, Latvian prime minister Krišjānis Kariņš, who was first appointed in 2018, had to be reappointed as head of a new government following the 2022 Latvian parliamentary election.

The position of prime minister is usually chosen from the political party that commands – whether by itself or as the largest member of a coalition – the majority of seats in the lower house of parliament, though this is not a requirement either; for example, following the 2018 Latvian parliamentary election, after two failed attempts by larger parties to form a coalition headed by them, the leader of the smallest party in parliament – Krišjānis Kariņš – was eventually appointed as a compromise candidate. Italy has seen several emergency technocratic governments, such as Carlo Azeglio Ciampi's and Mario Draghi's governments, where the prime minister was a non-partisan expert backed by the confidence and supply of a broad cross-section of the parliament.

In parliamentary systems, governments are generally required to have the confidence of the lower house of parliament (though a small minority of parliaments, by giving a right to block supply to upper houses, in effect make the cabinet responsible to both houses, though in reality upper houses, even when they have the power, rarely exercise it). Where they lose a vote of confidence, have a motion of no confidence passed against them, or where they lose supply, most constitutional systems require either:

1. a letter of resignation or
2. a request for parliamentary dissolution.

The latter in effect allows the government to appeal the opposition of parliament to the electorate. However, in many jurisdictions a head of state may refuse a parliamentary dissolution, requiring the resignation of the prime minister and their government. In most modern parliamentary systems, the prime minister is the person who decides when to request a parliamentary dissolution.

Older constitutions often vest this power in the cabinet. In the United Kingdom, for example, the tradition whereby it is the prime minister who requests a dissolution of parliament dates back to 1918. Prior to then, it was the entire government that made the request. Similarly, though the modern 1937 Irish constitution grants to the Taoiseach the right to make the request, the earlier 1922 Irish Free State Constitution vested the power in the Executive Council (the then name for the Irish cabinet).

Some systems, such as Germany and Spain, require motions of no confidence to be constructive: i.e., they must include the name of an alternative prime minister; if the motion of no confidence is successful, the alternative prime minister automatically takes office in place of the incumbent government, which cannot appeal this replacement to the electorate.

In Australia, the prime minister is expected to step down if they lose the majority support of their party under a spill motion as have many such as Tony Abbott, Julia Gillard, Kevin Rudd and Malcolm Turnbull.

=== Organisational structure ===
The prime minister's executive office is usually called the Office of the Prime Minister or Cabinet Office. The U.K.'s Cabinet Office includes the Prime Minister's Office. Conversely, some Prime Minister's Offices incorporate the role of Cabinet, while Australia's Department of the Prime Minister and Cabinet joins them at par. In Israel, the prime minister's executive office is officially titled the "Prime Minister's Office" in English, but the original Hebrew term can also be translated as the Prime Minister's Ministry. The Prime Minister's Department is also used, as is Cabinet Department.

=== Description of the role ===
Wilfried Martens, who served as Prime Minister of Belgium, described his role as follows:

First of all the Prime Minister must listen a lot, and when deep disagreements occur, he must suggest a solution to the matter. This can be done in different ways. Sometimes during the discussion, I note the elements of the problem and think of a proposal I can formulate to the Council (cabinet), the Secretary taking notes. The Ministers then insist on changing game ages. The Prime Minister can also make a proposal which leaves enough room for amendments in order to keep the current discussion on the right tracks. When a solution must be found in order to reach a consensus, he can force one or two Ministers to join or resign.

=== Symbols ===
Each country that adopts this system of government has symbols, such as institutional insignia, for the office of Prime Minister. For example, the flag of the Prime Minister of Jamaica.

Flag of the Prime Minister of Jamaica.

== Cross-country comparative details ==
=== Titles ===
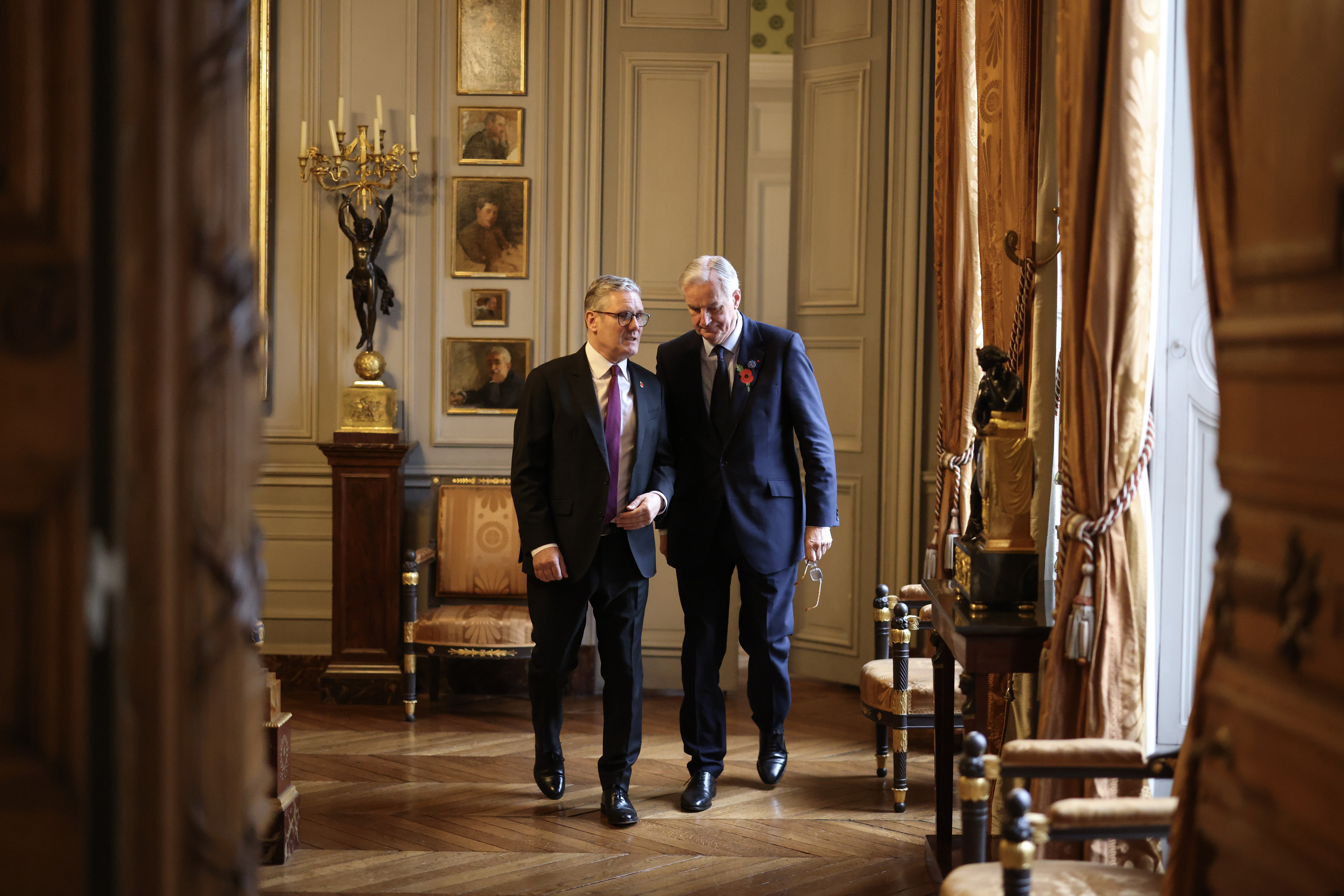
British Prime Minister Keir Starmer and French Prime Minister Michel Barnier in Paris, 2024

In many cases, though commonly used, "prime minister" is not the official title of the office-holder. In the Russian constitution, the prime minister is titled Chairman of the government. The Irish prime minister is called the Taoiseach (which is rendered into English as prime minister), in Israel the prime minister is Rosh HaMemshalah, meaning "head of the government", and the Spanish prime minister is the President of the Government (Presidente del Gobierno). The head of government of the People's Republic of China is referred to as the Premier of the State Council.

Other common forms include president of the council of ministers (for example in Italy, Presidente del Consiglio dei Ministri), President of the Executive Council, or Minister-President. In the Nordic countries the prime minister is called Statsminister, meaning "Minister of State". In federations, the head of government of a federated entity (such as the province or territory of Canada, the province of Argentina or the state of Brazil) is most commonly known as the premier, chief minister, governor or minister-president.

It is convention in the English language to call nearly all national heads of government "prime minister" (or sometimes the equivalent term "premier"), except in cases where the head of state and head of government are one position (usually a presidency), regardless of the correct title of the head of government as applied in their respective country. The few exceptions to the rule are Germany and Austria, whose head of government's title is Federal Chancellor; Monaco, whose head of government is referred to as the Minister of State; and Vatican City, for which the head of government is titled the Secretary of State. A stand-out case is the president of Iran, who is not actually a head of state, but the head of the government of Iran. He is referred to as "president" in both the Persian and English languages.

In non-Commonwealth countries, the prime minister may be entitled to the style of Excellency like a president. In some Commonwealth countries, prime ministers and former prime ministers are styled Honourable or Right Honourable associated with their position (the prime minister of Australia or the prime minister of Canada, for example). In the United Kingdom, the prime minister and former prime ministers are also often styled Honourable or Right Honourable; however, this is not due to their position as head of government, but a privilege of being current members of His Majesty's Most Honourable Privy Council.

In the UK, where devolved government is in place, the leaders of the Scottish, Northern Irish and Welsh Governments are styled First Minister. Between 1921 and 1972, when Northern Ireland had a majority rule Parliament, the head of government was the prime minister of Northern Ireland. In Bangladesh, the prime minister is called Prodhān Montrī, literally meaning "the head of ministers" or "prime minister". In India, the prime minister is called Pradhān Mantrī, literally meaning "the head of ministers" or "prime minister". In Pakistan, the prime minister is referred to as Wazir-e-Azam, meaning "grand vizier".

=== Constitutional basis for the position in different countries ===
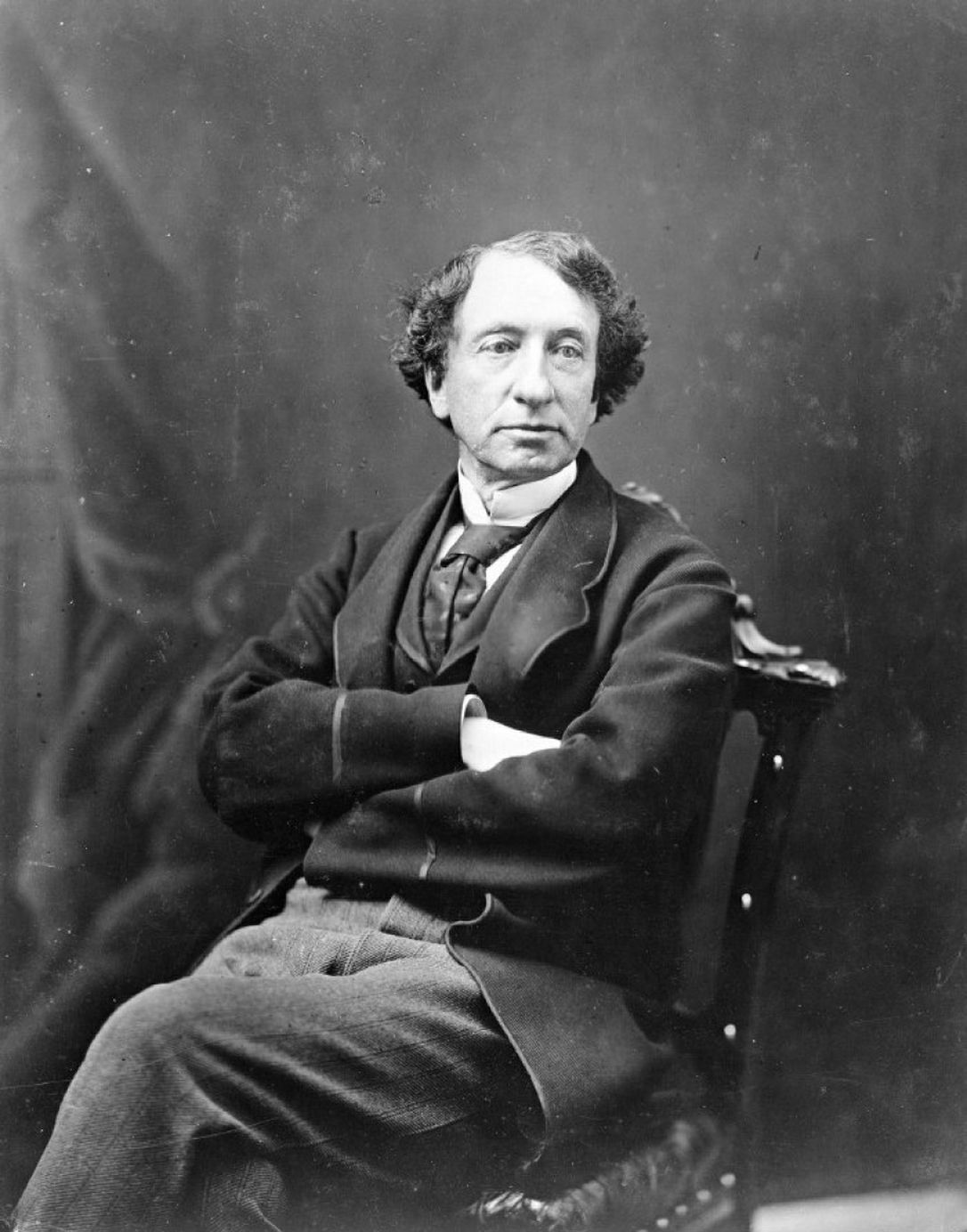
John A. Macdonald (1815–1891), first Canadian prime minister

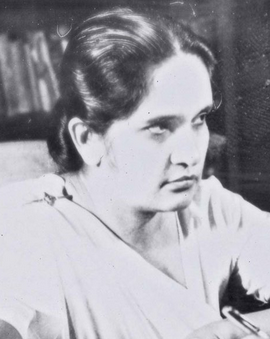
Sirimavo Bandaranaike (1916–2000), former Prime Minister of Sri Lanka and the first female prime minister

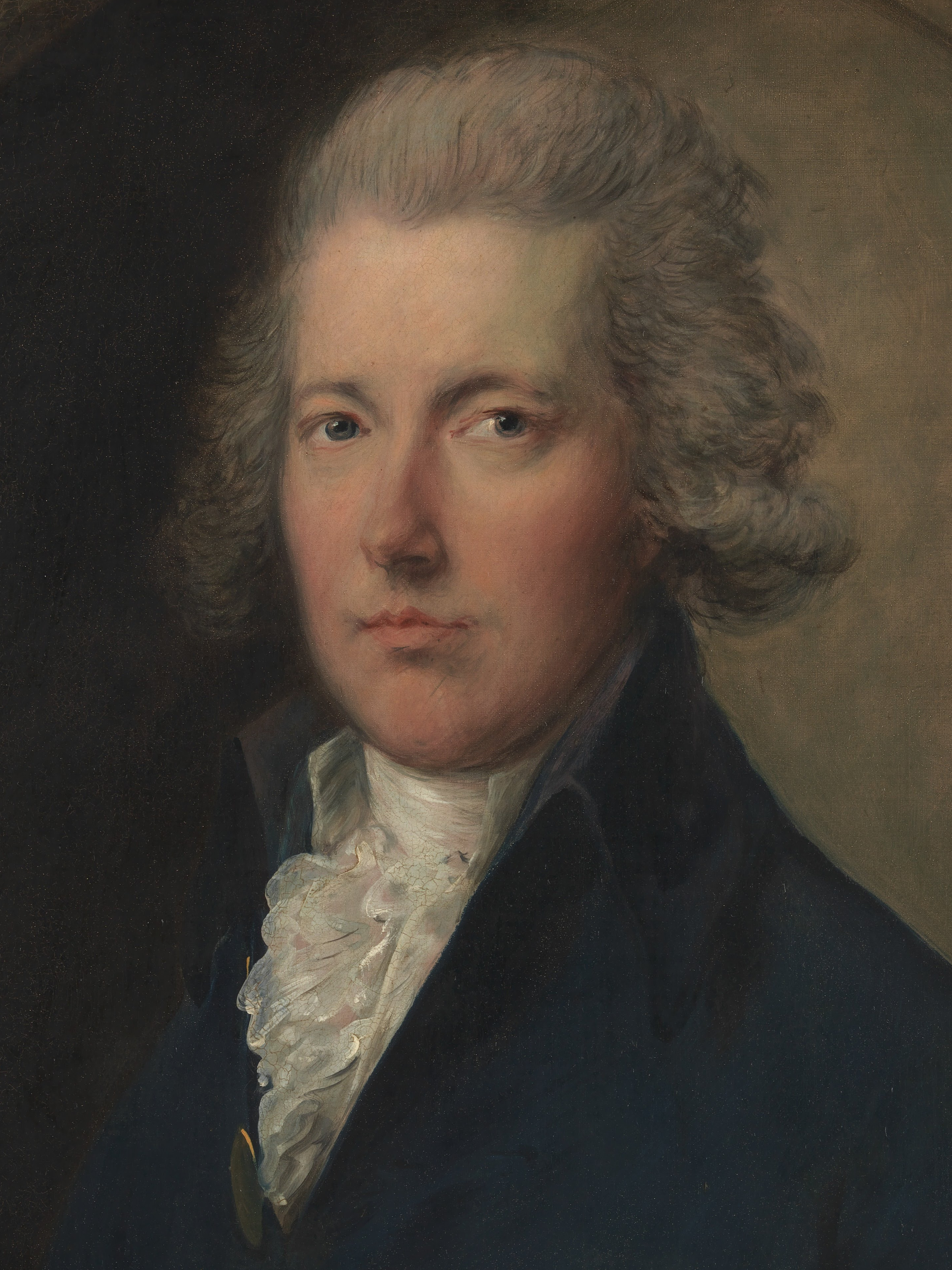
British prime minister William Pitt (1759–1806), the youngest head of government at the age of 24.

The position, power and status of prime ministers differ depending on the age of the constitution.

Entity	Title
Albania	Albanian definite form: Kryeministri
Algeria	Arabic: الوزير الأول الجزائري; French: Premier ministre d'Algérie
Australia	English: Prime Minister of Australia
Austria	Bundeskanzler
Bangladesh	Bengali: প্রধানমন্ত্রী, Prodhān Montrī
Bhutan	Lyonchhen
Buganda	Katikkiro
Bulgaria	Министър-председател, Ministar-predsedatel
Cambodia	នាយករដ្ឋមន្ត្រី, Néayuŏk-roătmôntrei
Canada	English: Prime Minister of Canada; French: Premier ministre du Canada
China	Chinese: 国务院总理, Guówùyuàn Zǒnglǐ
Denmark	(Kongeriget) Danmarks statsminister
Estonia	Peaminister
Eswatini	Ndvunankhulu
Faroe Islands	Faroese: Løgmaður; Danish: Lagmand
Finland	Finnish: Suomen pääministeri Swedish: Finlands statsminister
France	French: Premier ministre de la République française
Germany	Bundeskanzler
Georgia	პრემიერ-მინისტრი, Premier-Ministri
Greece	Prothypourgós tis Ellinikís Dimokratías
Greenland	Greenlandic: Naalakkersuisut siulittaasuat Danish: Landsstyreformand
Hungary	Miniszterelnök
Iceland	Forsætisráðherra Íslands
India	Hindi: प्रधान मंत्री, Pradhān Mantrī
Israel	Hebrew : רֹאשׁ הַמֶּמְשָׁלָה, Rosh HaMemshala
Ireland	Taoiseach
Italy	Presidente del Consiglio dei ministri
Japan	内閣総理大臣, Naikaku-sōri-daijin
Latvia	Ministru prezidents
Lithuania	Ministras Pirmininkas
Malaysia	Malay: Perdana Menteri Malaysia; Jawi: ڤردان منتري مليسيا
Malta	Prim Ministru ta' Malta
Mongolia	Prime Minister/Ерөнхий сайд Л.Оюун-эрдэнэ/L.Oyun-erdene
Montenegro	Premijer Crne Gore
Norway	Statsminister
Nepal	Nepali: प्रधानमन्त्री, Pradhān Mantrī
Netherlands	Minister-president van Nederland
New Zealand	English: Prime Minister of New Zealand; Māori: Te pirimia o Aotearoa
Pakistan	Urdu: وزیر اعظم, Wazīr-ē-Āzam
Poland	Prezes Rady Ministrów
Portugal	Primeiro-Ministro
Romania	Prim-ministrul Guvernului României
Russia	Председатель Правительства Российской Федерации, Predsedatel' Pravitel'stva Rossiyskoy Federatsii
Singapore	English: Prime Minister of the Republic of Singapore; Malay: Perdana Menteri Republik Singapura; Chinese: 新加坡共和国总理, Xīnjiāpō gònghéguó zǒnglǐ Tamil: சிங்கப்பூர் குடியரசின் பிரதமர், Ciṅkappūr kuṭiyaraciṉ piratamar
South Korea	Hangul: 국무총리; Hanja: 國務總理; RR: Gungmuchongni
Spain	Presidente del Gobierno
Sri Lanka	Sinhala: ශ්‍රී ලංකා අග්‍රාමාත්‍ය, Śrī Laṅkā agrāmātya Tamil: இலங்கை பிரதமர் Ilaṅkai piratamar
Sweden	Statsminister
Taiwan	Chinese: 行政院院長
Tanzania	Waziri mkuu
Thailand	นายกรัฐมนตรี, Nayok Ratthamontri
Turkey	Başbakan
Ukraine	Прем'єр-міністр України; Premier-ministr Ukrainy
United Kingdom	Prime Minister
Vietnam	Thủ Tướng

Algeria's constitution (1962) lists the powers, functions and duties of the prime minister of Algeria.

Australia's constitution makes no mention of a prime minister of Australia and the office only exists by convention, based on the British model.

Bangladesh's constitution clearly outlines the functions and powers of the prime minister, and also details the process of his/her appointment and dismissal.

The People's Republic of China constitution set a premier just one place below the National People's Congress in China. Premier read as (Simplified Chinese: 总理; pinyin: Zŏnglĭ) in Chinese.

Canada has a 'mixed' or hybrid constitution, partly formally codified and partly uncodified. The codified part originally made no reference whatsoever to a prime minister and still gives no parameters of the office. Instead, their powers, duties, appointment and termination follow uncodified conventions. The Constitution Act, 1867 only establishes the Queen's Privy Council for Canada, to which all federal ministers (among others) are appointed and with Members (Note: Which Members, though, are left to uncodified convention. As appointment to the Privy Council normally lasts for life, former Cabinet ministers predominate. The convention of Responsible Government, however, requires the Governor General to only act on the advice of the current Cabinet (or its ministers relevant to the issue at hand).) of which the Monarch or their Governor General normally performs executive government (as King- or Governor-in-Council). The Constitution Act, 1982, adds passing reference to the "Prime Minister of Canada" [French: premier ministre du Canada] but as detail of conferences of federal and provincial first ministers.)

Czech Republic's constitution clearly outlines the functions and powers of the prime minister of the Czech Republic, and also details the process of his/her appointment and dismissal.

Finland's constitution (1917) lists the powers, functions and duties of the prime minister of Finland.

France's constitution (1958) lists the powers, functions and duties of the prime minister of France.

Germany's Basic Law (1949) lists the powers, functions and duties of the federal chancellor.

Greece's constitution (1975) lists the powers, functions and duties of the prime minister of Greece.

Hungary's constitution (2012) lists the powers, functions and duties of the prime minister of Hungary.

India's constitution (1950) lists the powers, functions and duties of the prime minister of India. In India, prime ministerial candidates must be a member of parliament, i.e. of either the Lok Sabha (Lower House) or Rajya Sabha (Upper House). No parliamentary vote takes place on who forms a government.

Ireland's constitution (1937), provides for the office of Taoiseach in detail, listing powers, functions and duties.

Israel's constitution (1948) lists the powers, functions and duties of the prime minister of Israel.

Italy's constitution (1948) lists the powers, functions and duties of the president of the Council of Ministers.

Japan's constitution (1946) lists the powers, functions and duties of the prime minister of Japan.

The Republic of Korea's constitution (1987) sections 86–87 list the powers, functions and duties of the prime minister of the Republic of Korea.

Malta's constitution (1964) lists the powers, functions and duties of the prime minister of Malta.

Malaysia's constitution (1957) lists the powers, functions and duties of the prime minister of Malaysia.

Norway's constitution (1814) lists the powers, functions and duties of the prime minister of Norway

Pakistan's constitution (1973) lists the powers, functions and duties of the prime minister of Pakistan.

Poland's constitution (1918) lists the powers, functions and duties of the prime minister of Poland.

Spain's constitution (1978) regulates the appointment, dismissal, powers, functions and duties of the President of the Government.

Sri Lanka's constitution (1978) lists the powers, functions and duties of the prime minister of Sri Lanka.

Thailand's constitution (1932) lists the powers, functions and duties of the prime minister of Thailand.

Taiwan's constitution (1946) lists the powers, functions and duties of the Premier of the Republic of China.

The United Kingdom's constitution, being uncodified and largely unwritten, makes no mention of a prime minister. Though it had de facto existed for centuries, its first mention in official state documents did not occur until the first decade of the twentieth century. Accordingly, it is often said "not to exist"; indeed there are several instances of parliament declaring this to be the case. The prime minister sits in the cabinet solely by virtue of occupying another office, either First Lord of the Treasury (office in commission) or more rarely Chancellor of the Exchequer (the last of whom was Balfour in 1905).

In such systems unwritten (and unenforceable) constitutional conventions often outline the order in which people are asked to form a government. If the prime minister resigns after a general election, the monarch usually asks the leader of the opposition to form a government. Where however a resignation occurs during a parliament session (unless the government has itself collapsed) the monarch will ask another member of the government to form a government. While previously the monarch had some leeway in whom to ask, all British political parties now elect their leaders (until 1965 the Conservatives chose their leader by informal consultation). The last time the monarch had a choice over the appointment occurred in 1963 when the Earl of Home was asked to become prime minister ahead of Rab Butler.

During the period between the time it is clear that the incumbent government has been defeated at a general election, and the actual swearing-in of the new prime minister by the monarch, governor-general, or president, that person is referred to as the "prime minister-elect" or "prime minister-designate". Neither term is strictly correct from a constitutional point of view, but they have wide acceptance. In a situation in which a ruling party elects or appoints a new leader, the incoming leader will usually be referred as "prime minister-in-waiting". An example or this situation was in 2016 in the United Kingdom when Theresa May was elected leader of the Conservative Party while David Cameron was still prime minister.

Russia's constitution (1993) lists the powers, functions and duties of the prime minister of Russia.

Ukraine's constitution (1996) lists the powers, functions and duties of the prime minister of Ukraine.

== Lists of prime ministers ==
Countries with prime ministers (blue), those that formerly had that position (dark red) and those that never had that position (gray).

The following table groups the list of past and present prime ministers and details information available in those lists.

Government	List starts	Parties shown	Term given by years or dates	Incumbent
Abkhazia	1995	-	dates	Vladimir Delba
Afghanistan	1927	-	years	Hasan Akhund (acting)
Albania	1912	-	years	Edi Rama
Algeria	1962	yes	years	Nadir Larbaoui
Andorra	1982	-	years	Xavier Espot Zamora
Angola	1975	-	dates	(Post abolished)
Anguilla	1976	yes	dates	Cora Richardson-Hodge
Antigua and Barbuda	1981	-	years	Gaston Browne
Argentina (Note: Chief of the Cabinet of Ministers)	1993	yes	dates	Manuel Adorni
Armenia	1918	yes	dates	Nikol Pashinyan
Aruba	1986	-	dates	Mike Eman
Australia (List)	1901	yes	dates	Anthony Albanese
Austria (List)	1918	yes	years	Christian Stocker
Azerbaijan	1918	yes	dates	Ali Asadov
Bahamas	1967	-	dates	Philip Davis
Bahrain	1970	-	years	Crown Prince Salman
Bangladesh (List)	1971	yes	dates	Tarique Rahman
Barbados (List)	1953	yes	dates	Mia Mottley
Belarus (List)	1919	-	dates	Alexander Turchin
Belgium (List)	1831	yes	dates	Bart De Wever
Belize	1973	yes	years	Johnny Briceño
Benin	1957	yes	dates	(Post abolished)
Bermuda	1968	yes	dates	Edward David Burt
Bhutan	1952	-	dates	Lotay Tshering
Bosnia and Herzegovina	1945	-	dates	Borjana Krišto
Botswana	1965	yes	dates	(Post abolished)
Brazil	1847	yes	dates	(Post abolished)
British Virgin Islands	1967	yes	dates	Natalio Wheatley
Brunei	1984	no	dates	Sultan Hassanal Bolkiah
Bulgaria	1879	yes	dates	Rumen Radev
Burkina Faso	1971	-	dates	Apollinaire de Tambèla
Burundi	1961	yes	dates	(Post abolished)
Cambodia	1945	-	years	Hun Manet
Cameroon	1960	-	dates	Joseph Ngute
Canada (List)	1867	yes	dates	Mark Carney
Cape Verde	1975	yes	dates	Ulisses Correia e Silva
Cayman Islands	1992	yes	dates	Julianna O'Connor-Connolly
Central African Republic	1958	-	dates	Félix Moloua
Chad	1978	-	dates	Allamaye Halina
China (List)	1949	-	dates	Li Qiang
Comoros	1957	yes	dates	(Post abolished)
Congo (Brazzaville)	1957	yes	dates	Anatole Collinet Makosso
Congo (Kinshasa) (List)	1960	yes	dates	Judith Suminwa Tuluka
Cook Islands	1965	yes	dates	Mark Brown
Côte d'Ivoire (Ivory Coast)	1957	yes	dates	Robert Beugré Mambé
Croatia	1939	-	dates	Andrej Plenković
Cuba	1940	-	dates	Manuel Marrero Cruz
Curaçao	2010	-	dates	Gilmar Pisas
Northern Cyprus	1983	yes	dates	Ünal Üstel
Czech Republic (List)	1993	-	years	Andrej Babiš
Denmark (List)	1848	-	years	Mette Frederiksen
Djibouti	1977	-	dates	Abdoulkader Kamil Mohamed
Dominica	1960	-	dates	Roosevelt Skerrit
Egypt (List)	1878	-	years	Moustafa Madbouly
Equatorial Guinea	1963	-	dates	Manuela Roka Botey
Estonia	1918	-	dates	Kristen Michal
Ethiopia	1942	yes	dates	Abiy Ahmed
Faroe Islands	1946	-	years	Beinir Johannesen
Fiji	1966	-	dates	Sitiveni Rabuka
Finland (List)	1917	yes	years	Petteri Orpo
France (List)	1589	-	years	Sébastien Lecornu
Gabon	1957	yes	dates	Raymond Ndong Sima
The Gambia	1961	-	dates	(Post abolished)
Georgia	1918	yes	dates	Irakli Kobakhidze
Germany (List)	1871/1949	yes	dates	Friedrich Merz
Ghana	1957	-	dates	(Post abolished)
Gibraltar	1964	yes	dates	Fabian Picardo
Greece (List)	1833	-	dates	Kyriakos Mitsotakis
Greenland	1979	-	years	Jens-Frederik Nielsen
Grenada	1954	-	years	Dickon Mitchell
Guernsey	2007	-	dates	Lyndon Trott
Guinea	1972	-	dates	Bah Oury
Guinea-Bissau	1973	-	dates	Rui Duarte de Barros
Guyana	1953	-	dates	Mark Phillips
Haiti	1988	-	dates	Alix Didier Fils-Aimé (acting)
Hungary (List)	1848	-	dates	Péter Magyar
Iceland	1904	-	dates	Kristrún Frostadóttir
India (List)	1947	yes	dates	Narendra Modi
Indonesia	1945	yes	dates	(Post abolished)
Iran (List)	1906	-	years	(Post abolished)
Iraq	1920	-	years	Mohammed Al-Sudani
Ireland	1937	yes	dates	Micheál Martin
Israel (List)	1948	-	years	Benjamin Netanyahu
Italy (List)	1861	-	years	Giorgia Meloni
Jamaica	1959	-	years	Andrew Holness
Japan (List)	1885	-	dates	Sanae Takaichi
Jersey	2005	-	dates	Lyndon Farnham
Jordan	1944	-	dates	Jafar Hassan
Kazakhstan	1920	-	years	Oljas Bektenov
Kenya	1963	-	dates	(Post abolished)
North Korea	1948	-	years	Pak Thae-song
South Korea (List)	1948	-	years	Kim Min-seok
Kosovo	1945	yes	dates	Albin Kurti
Kuwait	1962	yes	dates	Sheikh Ahmad Al-Abdullah Al-Sabah
Kurdistan	1992	-	years	Masrour Barzani
Kyrgyzstan	1924	-	dates	Adylbek Kasymaliev
Laos	1941	-	years	Sonexay Siphandone
Latvia	1918	yes	dates	Evika Siliņa
Lebanon (List)	1926	-	dates	Nawaf Salam
Lesotho	1965	yes	dates	Sam Matekane
Libya	1951	-	dates	Abdul Hamid Dbeibeh
Liechtenstein	1921	yes	dates	Brigitte Haas
Lithuania	1918	yes	dates	Inga Ruginienė
Luxembourg	1848	yes	dates	Luc Frieden
Madagascar	1833	-	dates	Christian Ntsay
Malawi	1963	yes	dates	(Post abolished)
Malaysia	1957	yes	years	Anwar Ibrahim
Mali	1957	yes	dates	Abdoulaye Maïga (interim)
Malta	1921	yes	years	Robert Abela
Isle of Man	1986	-	years	Alfred Cannan
Mauritania	1957	yes	dates	Mokhtar Ould Djay
Mauritius	1961	yes	dates	Navin Ramgoolam
Moldova	1990	-	dates	Eugen Osmochescu
Monaco	1911	n/a	dates	Christophe Mirmand
Mongolia	1912	yes	dates	Luvsannamsrain Oyun-Erdene
Montenegro	1879	yes	dates	Milojko Spajić
Montserrat	1960	yes	dates	Easton Taylor-Farrell
Morocco	1955	yes	years	Aziz Akhannouch
Mozambique	1974	yes	dates	Adriano Maleiane
Myanmar (Burma)	1948	yes	dates	(Post abolished)
Namibia	1990	yes	dates	Saara Kuugongelwa
Nepal	1803	yes	dates	Balen Shah
Netherlands (List)	1848	yes	dates	Rob Jetten
New Zealand (List)	1856	yes	dates	Christopher Luxon
Newfoundland and Labrador (Note: Although now a Canadian province, Newfoundland was a self-governing Dominion and had its own Prime Minister. The title used now is Premier.) (List)	1855	yes	dates	Tony Wakeham
Niger	1958	yes	dates	Ali Lamine Zeine
Nigeria	1960	yes	dates	(Post abolished)
Niue	1974	-	dates	Sir Dalton Tagelagi
Norfolk Island	1896	2015	dates	(Post abolished)
North Macedonia	1943	yes	dates	Hristijan Mickoski
Norway	1814	yes	years	Jonas Gahr Støre
Pakistan (List)	1947	yes	dates	Shehbaz Sharif
Palestine	2003	yes	dates	Mohammad Mustafa
Papua New Guinea	1975	yes	years	James Marape
Peru	1857	-	dates	Luis Arroyo Sánchez
Philippines	1899	yes	dates	(Post abolished)
Poland (List)	1107	-	dates	Donald Tusk
Portugal (List)	1834	yes	dates	Luís Montenegro
Qatar	1970	-	dates	Sheikh Mohammed bin Abdulrahman bin Jassim Al Thani
Romania (List)	1862	-	years	Ilie Bolojan
Russia (List)	1864/1905	yes	dates	Mikhail Mishustin
Rwanda	1960	yes	dates	Édouard Ngirente
Saint Kitts and Nevis	1960	-	dates	Terrance Drew
Saint Lucia	1960	-	dates	Philip Pierre
Saint Vincent and the Grenadines	1956	-	dates	Godwin Friday
Samoa	1875	yes	dates	Fiamē Naomi Mataʻafa
São Tomé and Principe	1974	yes	dates	Patrice Trovoada
Saudi Arabia	1953	no	dates	Mohammad bin Salman
Senegal	1957	yes	dates	Ousmane Sonko
Serbia	1805	yes	years	Đuro Macut
Seychelles	1970	yes	years	(Post abolished)
Sierra Leone	1954	yes	dates	David Moinina Sengeh
Singapore	1959	-	dates	Lawrence Wong
Sint Maarten	2010	-	dates	Silveria Jacobs
Slovakia (List)	1993	-	dates	Robert Fico
Slovenia	1943	yes	years	Janez Janša
Solomon Islands	1949	yes	dates	Jeremiah Manele
Somalia	1949	yes	dates	Hamza Abdi Barre
South Africa	1910	-	dates	(Post abolished)
South Ossetia	1991	-	dates	Konstantin Dzhussoev
Spain (List)	1705	yes	years	Pedro Sánchez
Sri Lanka (List)	1948	-	dates	Harini Amarasuriya
Sudan (List)	1952	yes	dates	Kamil Idris
Suriname	1949	yes	dates	(Post abolished)
Swaziland	1967	-	years	Russell Dlamini
Sweden (List)	1876	yes	years	Ulf Kristersson
Syria (List)	1920	-	dates	(Post abolished)
Taiwan (Republic of China) (List)	1912	-	dates	Cho Jung-tai
Tajikistan	1924	-	dates	Qohir Rasulzoda
Tanzania	1960	yes	dates	Kassim Majaliwa
Thailand (List)	1932	yes	dates	Anutin Charnvirakul
Timor-Leste	2002	yes	dates	Xanana Gusmão
Togo	1956	yes	dates	Faure Gnassingbé
Tokelau	1992	-	dates	Kerisiano Kalolo
Tonga	1876	-	years	Fatafehi Fakafānua
Transnistria	2012	yes	dates	Aleksandr Rosenberg
Trinidad and Tobago	1956	-	dates	Kamla Persad-Bissessar
Tunisia	1969	-	dates	Kamel Madouri
Turkey (List)	1920	yes	dates	(Post abolished)
Turkmenistan	1924	-	dates	(Post abolished)
Turks and Caicos Islands	1976	yes	dates	Washington Misick
Tuvalu	1975	n/a	dates	Feleti Teo
Uganda	1961	yes	dates	Robinah Nabbanja
Ukraine (List)	1917	-	dates	Yulia Svyrydenko
United Arab Emirates	1971	-	years	Sheikh Mohammed bin Rashid Al Maktoum
United Kingdom (List)	1721	yes	dates	Andy Burnham
Uruguay	1919	-	-	(Post abolished)
Uzbekistan	1924	-	dates	Abdulla Aripov
Vanuatu	1980	yes	dates	Jotham Napat
Vatican	1644	-	years	Cardinal Pietro Parolin
Vietnam	1976	yes	dates	Lê Minh Hưng
Yemen	1990	yes	years	Maeen Abdulmalik Saeed
Western Sahara	1976	no	years	Bouchraya Hammoudi Bayoun
Zambia	1964	yes	dates	(Post abolished)
Zimbabwe	1923	-	dates	(Post abolished)

== See also ==
- List of current prime ministers by date of assumption of office
- Chancellor
- Chief minister
- Governor-general
- Grand vizier
- Head of government
- Head of state
- Monarch
- President
- Prime ministerial government

Lists

- List of current heads of state and government
- List of democracy and election-related topics
