= Head of government =

Chief officer of the executive branch of a government

The head of government serves as the highest official in the executive branch of a state. The head of government usually handles the day to day affairs of the state, and leads the ministers who control the government. In many democratic systems the head of state is also the head of government. In non democratic systems the head of government is usually established via military intervention.

In most parliamentary systems, including constitutional monarchies, the head of government is the de facto political leader of the government, and is answerable to at least one chamber of the legislature. Although there is often a formal reporting relationship to a head of state, the latter usually acts as a figurehead who may take the role of chief executive on limited occasions, either when receiving constitutional advice from the head of government or under specific provisions in a constitution.

In semi-presidential systems, the head of government may answer to both the head of state and the legislature with the specifics provided by each country's constitution.

In communist states, the general secretary of the Communist Party is the supreme leader, serving as de facto head of state and government. In some cases, the general secretary was also the de jure head of government, or Premier, like in the Soviet Union under Joseph Stalin from 1941 to 1953 and Nikita Khrushchev from 1958 to 1964. In other cases, like in modern-day China, the position of Premier is held by a different politician.

== Types ==
In some governments, those who are the heads of state also perform the duties of the head of government. The President of the United States is one example. Certain governments those roles are separate, with the head of state merely being a figurehead. In the United Kingdom the Prime Minister handles the affairs of the state, while the monarch (who is the head of state) has a largely ceremonial role with no political power. Russia also employs a similar structure, though the role of president has full political power. In Japan, there exists an emperor with little political power, with all government issues being handled by the prime minister. In Israel, while the Government is nominally a collegiate body with a primus inter pares role for the Prime Minister, the Israeli Prime Minister is the dominant figure in the executive branch in practice.

== Assumption of power ==
=== Via election/appointment ===
Elections have been the usual mechanism by which representative government has operated since the 17th century. However, in most parliamentary systems the prime minister is not directly elected by voters, but is the leader of the most dominant party in parliament. In presidential systems, the head of government is appointed by the president. According to Wolfgang Müller and Wilfried Philipp, heads of government have lasted in office on average 3.8 years in post-1945 Western Europe.

=== Seizure of power ===
In some instances, the head of government comes to political authority via force, such as in a coup. In authoritarian systems, the selection of the head of government is typically not open to the general public.

Under military dictatorships, the military’s leader usually fills the role of head of state, head of government, or both. A military dictator may install a figurehead as head of government, but generally keeps some or all executive governing powers for themselves.

== See also ==
- Head of state
- Government
- List of current heads of state and government
- List of current prime ministers by date of assumption of office
- List of elected and appointed female heads of state and government
- Air transports of heads of state and government
