= 1963 Algerian constitutional referendum =

- 8 September 1963
- Have you approved the Constitution proposed to you?

Results
Choice	Votes	%
Yes	5,166,185	98.01%
No	105,047	1.99%
Valid votes	5,271,232	99.75%
Invalid or blank votes	13,377	0.25%
Total votes	5,284,609	100.00%
Registered voters/turnout	6,391,818	82.68%

A constitutional referendum was held in Algeria on 8 September 1963. The new constitution had been drawn up by the Constituent Assembly elected in 1962, and was approved by 98% of voters, with a turnout of 83%.

== Results ==
Choice	Votes	%
For	5,166,185	98.01
Against	105,047	1.99
Total	5,271,232	100.00
Valid votes	5,271,232	99.75
Invalid/blank votes	13,377	0.25
Total votes	5,284,609	100.00
Registered voters/turnout	6,391,818	82.68
Source: Official Journal
