= List of current prime ministers by date of assumption of office =

This is a list of current prime ministers of the world's sovereign states by the date they took office, from the earliest to the latest.

== List of current prime ministers ==
Prime Minister	Title	State's political system	Date of assumption	Current length of term
Hassanal Bolkiah	Prime Minister of Brunei	Absolute monarchy	1 January 1984	42 years, 313 days
Roosevelt Skerrit	Prime Minister of Dominica	Parliamentary republic	8 January 2004	22 years, 306 days
Mohammed bin Rashid Al Maktoum	Prime Minister of United Arab Emirates	Semi-constitutional monarchy	11 February 2006	20 years, 272 days
Abdoulkader Kamil Mohamed	Prime Minister of Djibouti	Presidential republic	1 April 2013	13 years, 223 days
Edi Rama	Prime Minister of Albania	Parliamentary republic	13 September 2013	13 years, 58 days
Kokhir Rasulzoda	Prime Minister of Tajikistan	Presidential republic	23 November 2013	12 years, 352 days
Narendra Modi	Prime Minister of India	Parliamentary republic	26 May 2014	12 years, 168 days
Gaston Browne	Prime Minister of Antigua and Barbuda	Constitutional monarchy	13 June 2014	12 years, 150 days
Andrew Holness	Prime Minister of Jamaica	Constitutional monarchy	3 March 2016	10 years, 252 days
Andrej Plenković	Prime Minister of Croatia	Parliamentary republic	19 October 2016	10 years, 22 days
Abdulla Aripov	Prime Minister of Uzbekistan	Presidential republic	14 December 2016	9 years, 331 days
Abiy Ahmed	Prime Minister of Ethiopia	Parliamentary republic	2 April 2018	8 years, 222 days
Nikol Pashinyan	Prime Minister of Armenia	Parliamentary republic	8 May 2018	8 years, 186 days
Mia Mottley	Prime Minister of Barbados	Parliamentary republic	25 May 2018	8 years, 169 days
Pedro Sánchez	Prime Minister of Spain	Constitutional monarchy	2 June 2018	8 years, 161 days
Moustafa Madbouly	Prime Minister of Egypt	Semi-presidential republic	7 June 2018	8 years, 156 days
Joseph Ngute	Prime Minister of Cameroon	Presidential republic	4 January 2019	7 years, 310 days
Xavier Espot Zamora	Prime Minister of Andorra	Constitutional monarchy	16 May 2019	7 years, 178 days
James Marape	Prime Minister of Papua New Guinea	Constitutional monarchy	30 May 2019	7 years, 164 days
Mette Frederiksen	Prime Minister of Denmark	Constitutional monarchy	27 June 2019	7 years, 136 days
Ali Asadov	Prime Minister of Azerbaijan	Semi-presidential republic	8 October 2019	7 years, 33 days
Manuel Marrero Cruz	Prime Minister of Cuba	One-party state	21 December 2019	6 years, 324 days
Luca Beccari	Secretary for Foreign Affairs of San Marino	Parliamentary republic	7 January 2020	6 years, 307 days
Haitham bin Tariq	Prime Minister of Oman	Absolute monarchy	11 January 2020	6 years, 303 days
Robert Abela	Prime Minister of Malta	Parliamentary republic	13 January 2020	6 years, 301 days
Mikhail Mishustin	Prime Minister of Russia	Semi-presidential republic	16 January 2020	6 years, 298 days
Mark Phillips	Prime Minister of Guyana	Parliamentary republic	2 August 2020	6 years, 100 days
Salman bin Hamad Al Khalifa	Prime Minister of Bahrain	Semi-constitutional monarchy	11 November 2020	5 years, 364 days
Johnny Briceño	Prime Minister of Belize	Constitutional monarchy	12 November 2020	5 years, 363 days
Abdul Hamid Dbeibeh	Prime Minister of Libya	Provisional government	15 March 2021	5 years, 240 days
Anatole Collinet Makosso	Prime Minister of the Republic of the Congo	Semi-presidential republic	12 May 2021	5 years, 182 days
Robinah Nabbanja	Prime Minister of Uganda	Presidential republic	21 June 2021	5 years, 142 days
Phillip Pierre	Prime Minister of Saint Lucia	Constitutional monarchy	28 July 2021	5 years, 105 days
Hasan Akhund	Prime Minister of Afghanistan	Theocracy	7 September 2021	5 years, 64 days
Philip Davis	(The Bahamas) Prime Minister of the Bahamas	Constitutional monarchy	17 September 2021	5 years, 54 days
Jonas Gahr Støre	Prime Minister of Norway	Constitutional monarchy	14 October 2021	5 years, 27 days
Félix Moloua	Prime Minister of Central African Republic	Presidential republic	7 February 2022	4 years, 276 days
Anthony Albanese	Prime Minister of Australia	Constitutional monarchy	23 May 2022	4 years, 171 days
Dickon Mitchell	Prime Minister of Grenada	Constitutional monarchy	24 June 2022	4 years, 139 days
Hamza Abdi Barre	Prime Minister of Somalia	Parliamentary republic	26 June 2022	4 years, 137 days
Terrance Drew	Prime Minister of Saint Kitts and Nevis	Constitutional monarchy	6 August 2022	4 years, 96 days
Mohammed bin Salman	Prime Minister of Saudi Arabia	Absolute monarchy	27 September 2022	4 years, 44 days
Ulf Kristersson	Prime Minister of Sweden	Constitutional monarchy	18 October 2022	4 years, 23 days
Giorgia Meloni	Prime Minister of Italy	Parliamentary republic	22 October 2022	4 years, 19 days
Musalia Mudavadi	Prime Cabinet Secretary of Kenya	Presidential republic	27 October 2022	4 years, 14 days
Sam Matekane	Prime Minister of Lesotho	Constitutional monarchy	28 October 2022	4 years, 13 days
Anwar Ibrahim	Prime Minister of Malaysia	Constitutional monarchy	24 November 2022	3 years, 351 days
Sitiveni Rabuka	Prime Minister of Fiji	Parliamentary republic	24 December 2022	3 years, 321 days
Benjamin Netanyahu	Prime Minister of Israel	Parliamentary republic	29 December 2022	3 years, 316 days
Borjana Krišto	Chairwoman of the Council of Ministers of Bosnia and Herzegovina	Parliamentary republic	25 January 2023	3 years, 289 days
Mohammed bin Abdulrahman bin Jassim Al Thani	Prime Minister of Qatar	Semi-constitutional monarchy	7 March 2023	3 years, 248 days
Li Qiang	Premier of China	One-party state	11 March 2023	3 years, 244 days
Osama Hammad	claimed Acting Prime Minister of Libya appointed by House of Representatives	Provisional government	16 May 2023	3 years, 178 days
Petteri Orpo	Prime Minister of Finland	Parliamentary republic	20 June 2023	3 years, 143 days
Kyriakos Mitsotakis	Prime Minister of Greece	Parliamentary republic	26 June 2023	3 years, 137 days
Xanana Gusmão	Prime Minister of Timor-Leste	Semi-presidential republic	1 July 2023	3 years, 132 days
David Moinina Sengeh	Chief Minister of Sierra Leone	Presidential republic	10 July 2023	3 years, 123 days
Ali Lamine Zeine	Prime Minister of Niger	Provisional government	8 August 2023	3 years, 94 days
Hun Manet	Prime Minister of Cambodia	Constitutional monarchy	22 August 2023	3 years, 80 days
Robert Beugré Mambé	Prime Minister of Ivory Coast	Presidential republic	17 October 2023	3 years, 24 days
Robert Fico	Prime Minister of Slovakia	Parliamentary republic	25 October 2023	3 years, 16 days
Milojko Spajić	Prime Minister of Montenegro	Parliamentary republic	31 October 2023	3 years, 10 days
Russell Dlamini	Prime Minister of Eswatini	Absolute monarchy	3 November 2023	3 years, 7 days
Luc Frieden	Prime Minister of Luxembourg	Constitutional monarchy	17 November 2023	2 years, 358 days
Christopher Luxon	Prime Minister of New Zealand	Constitutional monarchy	27 November 2023	2 years, 348 days
Donald Tusk	Prime Minister of Poland	Parliamentary republic	13 December 2023	2 years, 332 days
Tshering Tobgay	Prime Minister of Bhutan	Semi-constitutional monarchy	28 January 2024	2 years, 286 days
Oljas Bektenov	Prime Minister of Kazakhstan	Presidential republic	6 February 2024	2 years, 277 days
Irakli Kobakhidze	(Georgia (country)) Prime Minister of Georgia	Parliamentary republic	8 February 2024	2 years, 275 days
Feleti Teo	Prime Minister of Tuvalu	Parliamentary republic	26 February 2024	2 years, 257 days
Bah Oury	Prime Minister of Guinea	Provisional government	27 February 2024	2 years, 256 days
Shehbaz Sharif	Prime Minister of Pakistan	Parliamentary republic	4 March 2024	2 years, 251 days
Mohammad Mustafa	Prime Minister of Palestine	Semi-presidential republic	14 March 2024	2 years, 241 days
Luís Montenegro	Prime Minister of Portugal	Semi-presidential republic	2 April 2024	2 years, 222 days
Ahmad Al-Abdullah Al-Sabah	Prime Minister of Kuwait	Semi-constitutional monarchy	15 May 2024	2 years, 179 days
Lawrence Wong	Prime Minister of Singapore	Parliamentary republic	15 May 2024	2 years, 179 days
Cho Jung-tai	(Taiwan) Premier of the Republic of China	Semi-presidential republic	20 May 2024	2 years, 174 days
Allamaye Halina	Prime Minister of Chad	Semi-presidential republic	23 May 2024	2 years, 171 days
Guillermo Francos	Chief of the Cabinet of Ministers of Argentina	Presidential republic	27 May 2024	2 years, 167 days
Judith Tuluka	Prime Minister of the Democratic Republic of the Congo	Semi-presidential republic	12 June 2024	2 years, 151 days
Hristijan Mickoski	Prime Minister of North Macedonia	Parliamentary republic	23 June 2024	2 years, 140 days
Kristen Michal	Prime Minister of Estonia	Parliamentary republic	23 July 2024	2 years, 110 days
Mokhtar Ould Djay	Prime Minister of Mauritania	Semi-presidential republic	2 August 2024	2 years, 100 days
Manuel Osa Nsue Nsua	Prime Minister of Equatorial Guinea	Presidential republic	17 August 2024	2 years, 85 days
Jafar Hassan	Prime Minister of Jordan	Semi-constitutional monarchy	15 September 2024	2 years, 56 days
Harini Amarasuriya	Prime Minister of Sri Lanka	Semi-presidential republic	24 September 2024	2 years, 47 days
Alix Didier Fils-Aimé	Acting Prime Minister of Haiti	Semi-presidential republic	10 November 2024	2 years, 0 days
Navin Ramgoolam	Prime Minister of Mauritius	Parliamentary republic	13 November 2024	1 year, 362 days
Abdoulaye Maïga	Acting Prime Minister of Mali	Presidential republic	21 November 2024	1 year, 354 days
Jean Emmanuel Ouédraogo	Interim Prime Minister of Burkina Faso	Provisional government	7 December 2024	1 year, 338 days
Adylbek Kasymaliev	Chairman of the Cabinet of Ministers of Kyrgyzstan	Presidential republic	16 December 2024	1 year, 329 days
Kristrún Frostadóttir	Prime Minister of Iceland	Parliamentary republic	21 December 2024	1 year, 324 days
Pak Thae-song	Premier of North Korea	One-party state	29 December 2024	1 year, 316 days
Américo Ramos	Prime Minister of São Tomé and Príncipe	Semi-presidential republic	14 January 2025	1 year, 300 days
Maria Benvinda Levy	Prime Minister of Mozambique	Semi-presidential republic	15 January 2025	1 year, 299 days
Micheál Martin	(Republic of Ireland) Taoiseach of Ireland	Parliamentary republic	23 January 2025	1 year, 291 days
Bart De Wever	Prime Minister of Belgium	Constitutional monarchy	3 February 2025	1 year, 280 days
Nawaf Salam	Prime Minister of Lebanon	Parliamentary republic	8 February 2025	1 year, 275 days
Jotham Napat	Prime Minister of Vanuatu	Parliamentary republic	11 February 2025	1 year, 272 days
Raffaella Petrini	President of the Governorate of Vatican City	Absolute monarchy	1 March 2025	1 year, 254 days
Christian Stocker	Chancellor of Austria	Parliamentary republic	3 March 2025	1 year, 252 days
Alexander Turchin	Prime Minister of Belarus	Presidential republic	10 March 2025	1 year, 245 days
Mark Carney	Prime Minister of Canada	Constitutional monarchy	14 March 2025	1 year, 241 days
Sara Zaafarani	Prime Minister of Tunisia	Semi-presidential republic	21 March 2025	1 year, 234 days
Elijah Ngurare	Prime Minister of Namibia	Semi-presidential republic	21 March 2025	1 year, 234 days
Brigitte Haas	Prime Minister of Liechtenstein	Semi-constitutional monarchy	10 April 2025	1 year, 214 days
Đuro Macut	Prime Minister of Serbia	Parliamentary republic	16 April 2025	1 year, 208 days
Kamla Persad-Bissessar	Prime Minister of Trinidad and Tobago	Parliamentary republic	1 May 2025	1 year, 193 days
Faure Gnassingbé	President of the Council of Ministers of Togo	Parliamentary republic	3 May 2025	1 year, 191 days
Friedrich Merz	Chancellor of Germany	Parliamentary republic	6 May 2025	1 year, 188 days
Kamil Idris	Prime Minister of Sudan	Provisional government	19 May 2025	1 year, 175 days
Christophe Mirmand	Minister of State of Monaco	Semi-constitutional monarchy	21 July 2025	1 year, 112 days
Justin Nsengiyumva	Prime Minister of Rwanda	Presidential republic	25 July 2025	1 year, 108 days
Nestor Ntahontuye	Prime Minister of Burundi	Presidential republic	5 August 2025	1 year, 97 days
Sifi Ghrieb	Prime Minister of Algeria	Semi-presidential republic	28 August 2025	1 year, 74 days
Anutin Charnvirakul	Prime Minister of Thailand	Constitutional monarchy	7 September 2025	1 year, 64 days
Sébastien Lecornu	Prime Minister of France	Semi-presidential republic	9 September 2025	1 year, 62 days
Laʻauli Leuatea Schmidt	Prime Minister of Samoa	Parliamentary republic	16 September 2025	1 year, 55 days
Sanae Takaichi	Prime Minister of Japan	Constitutional monarchy	21 October 2025	1 year, 20 days
Mwigulu Nchemba	Prime Minister of Tanzania	Presidential republic	13 November 2025	362 days
Ilídio Vieira Té	Prime Minister of Guinea-Bissau	Semi-presidential republic	28 November 2025	347 days
Godwin Friday	Prime Minister of Saint Vincent and the Grenadines	Constitutional monarchy	28 November 2025	347 days
Andrej Babiš	Prime Minister of Czech Republic	Parliamentary republic	9 December 2025	336 days
Fatafehi Fakafānua	Prime Minister of Tonga	Semi-constitutional monarchy	18 December 2025	327 days
Shaea al-Zindani	Prime Minister of Yemen	Provisional government	15 January 2026	299 days
Tarique Rahman	Prime Minister of Bangladesh	Parliamentary republic	17 February 2026	266 days
Rob Jetten	Prime Minister of the Netherlands	Constitutional monarchy	23 February 2026	260 days
Mamitiana Rajaonarison	Prime Minister of Madagascar	Semi-presidential republic	15 March 2026	240 days
Balen Shah	Prime Minister of Nepal	Parliamentary republic	27 March 2026	228 days
Nyam-Osoryn Uchral	Prime Minister of Mongolia	Semi-presidential republic	30 March 2026	225 days
Lê Minh Hưng	Prime Minister of Vietnam	One-party state	7 April 2026	217 days
Rumen Radev	Prime Minister of Bulgaria	Parliamentary republic	8 May 2026	186 days
Péter Magyar	Prime Minister of Hungary	Parliamentary republic	9 May 2026	185 days
Ali al-Zaidi	Prime Minister of Iraq	Parliamentary republic	14 may 2026	180 days
Matthew Wale	Prime Minister of Solomon Islands	Constitutional monarchy	15 May 2026	179 days
Ahmadou Al Aminou Lo	Prime Minister of Senegal	Presidential republic	25 May 2026	169 days
Andris Kulbergs	Prime Minister of Latvia	Parliamentary republic	28 May 2026	166 days
Janez Janša	Prime Minister of Slovenia	Parliamentary republic	4 June 2026	159 days
Francisco Carvalho	Prime Minister of Cape Verde	Semi-presidential republic	19 June 2026	144 days
Han Seong-sook	Prime Minister of South Korea	Presidential republic	1 July 2026	132 days
Mindaugas Sinkevičius	Prime Minister of Lithuania	Semi-presidential republic	14 July 2026	119 days
Serhii Koretskyi	Prime Minister of Ukraine	Semi-presidential republic	16 July 2026	117 days
Andy Burnham	Prime Minister of the United Kingdom	Constitutional monarchy	20 July 2026	113 days
Vasile Tofan	Prime Minister of Moldova	Parliamentary republic	22 July 2026	111 days
Luis Galarreta	Prime Minister of Peru	Presidential republic	28 July 2026	105 days
Fatima Ezzahra El Mansouri	Prime Minister of Morocco	Semi-constitutional monarchy	29 September 2026	42 days
Saleumxay Kommasith	Prime Minister of Laos	One-party state	5 October 2026	36 days
Luca Niculescu	Prime Minister of Romania	Semi-presidential republic	20 October 2026	21 days

== See also ==
- List of current state leaders by date of assumption of office
- List of current vice presidents and designated acting presidents
- List of longest-serving presidents
