= List of longest-serving presidents =

This is a list of longest-serving heads of state and/or government of sovereign states officially titled President with the longest terms known to history, either consecutive or non-consecutive.

== Criteria ==
- In case of non-consecutive terms, the total time served is considered as a single count.
- Only presidents that have served at least ten years (3,650 days) are included.
- Only the period in which the office holder was officially called "President" is considered, even if they have also served under positions with different names.
- Both executive and non-executive presidents are included, as in some systems the role is purely ceremonial.

== List ==
Incumbent president. Length as of 8 November 2026.

#	Name	Length (days)	Length (years)	Country	System(s)	First assumption of office	Last end of office	Consecutive?
1	Teodoro Obiang Nguema Mbasogo	16,098	44 years, 27 days	Equatorial Guinea	Presidential republic Authoritarian dictatorship	12 October 1982	incumbent	Yes
2	Paul Biya	16,073	44 years, 2 days	Cameroon	Presidential republic Authoritarian dictatorship	6 November 1982	incumbent	Yes
3	Denis Sassou Nguesso	15,559	42 years, 219 days	Congo-Brazzaville	Communist state Semi-presidential republic Authoritarian dictatorship	8 February 1979	incumbent	No
4	Omar Bongo	15,127	41 years, 162 days	Gabon	Presidential republic One-party state Authoritarian regime	2 December 1967	8 June 2009	Yes
5	Yoweri Museveni	14,896	40 years, 286 days	Uganda	Presidential republic Authoritarian dictatorship	29 January 1986	incumbent	Yes
6	José Eduardo dos Santos	14,250	38 years, 5 days	Angola	Communist state Presidential republic	21 September 1979	26 September 2017	Yes
7	Gnassingbé Eyadéma	13,802	37 years, 297 days	Togo	Parliamentary republic Authoritarian dictatorship	14 April 1967	5 February 2005	Yes
8	Alfredo Stroessner	12,591	34 years, 172 days	Paraguay	Military dictatorship	15 August 1954	3 February 1989	Yes
9	Isaias Afwerki	12,221	33 years, 168 days	Eritrea	Presidential republic Authoritarian dictatorship	20 May 1993	incumbent	Yes
10	Félix Houphouët-Boigny	12,045	33 years, 34 days	Ivory Coast	Presidential republic One-party state Authoritarian regime	3 November 1960	7 December 1993	Yes
11	Alexander Lukashenko	11,799	32 years, 111 days	Belarus	Semi-presidential republic Authoritarian dictatorship	20 July 1994	incumbent	Yes
12	Emomali Rahmon	11,680	31 years, 357 days	Tajikistan	Presidential republic Authoritarian dictatorship	16 November 1994	incumbent	Yes
13	Mobutu Sese Seko	11,488	31 years, 173 days	Zaire	Presidential republic Authoritarian dictatorship	24 November 1965	16 May 1997	Yes
14	Fidel Castro	11,406	31 years, 84 days	Cuba	Communist state	2 December 1976	24 February 2008	Yes
15	Porfirio Díaz	11,061	30 years, 105 days	Mexico	Military dictatorship	28 November 1876	25 May 1911	No
16	Habib Bourguiba	11,061	30 years, 105 days	Tunisia	Presidential republic One-party state Authoritarian regime	25 July 1957	7 November 1987	Yes
17	Suharto	11,005	30 years, 55 days	Indonesia	Presidential republic Authoritarian regime	27 March 1968	21 May 1998	Yes
18	Idriss Déby	11,001	30 years, 51 days	Chad	Presidential republic Authoritarian regime	28 February 1991	20 April 2021	Yes
19	Maumoon Abdul Gayoom	10,950	30 years	Maldives	Presidential republic Authoritarian regime	11 November 1978	11 November 2008	Yes
20	Robert Mugabe	10,910	29 years, 325 days	Zimbabwe	Assembly-independent republic	10,918	29 years, 325 days	Yes
21	Omar al-Bashir	10,870	29 years, 285 days	Sudan	Presidential republic Authoritarian regime	30 June 1989	11 April 2019	Yes
22	Hosni Mubarak	10,712	29 years, 120 days	Egypt	Semi-presidential republic Authoritarian regime	14 October 1981	11 February 2011	Yes
23	Hafez al-Assad	10,683	29 years, 90 days	Ba'athist Syria	Presidential republic Totalitarian dictatorship	12 March 1971	10 June 2000	Yes
24	Nursultan Nazarbayev	10,557	28 years, 330 days	Kazakhstan	Presidential republic Authoritarian dictatorship	24 April 1990	20 March 2019	Yes
25	Hastings Banda	10,177	27 years, 322 days	Malawi	Presidential republic One-party state Authoritarian regime	6 July 1966	24 May 1994	Yes
26	William Tubman	10,063	27 years, 201 days	Liberia	Presidential republic Dominant-party state Authoritarian regime	January 3, 1944	July 23, 1971	Yes
27	Ismaïl Omar Guelleh	10,046	27 years, 184 days	Djibouti	Presidential republic Authoritarian dictatorship	8 May 1999	incumbent	Yes
28	France-Albert René	9,894	27 years, 39 days	Seychelles	Presidential republic One-party state	5 June 1977	14 July 2004	Yes
29	Blaise Compaoré	9,871	27 years, 16 days	Burkina Faso	Semi-presidential republic Authoritarian dictatorship	15 October 1987	31 October 2014	Yes
30	Kenneth Kaunda	9,864	27 years, 9 days	Zambia	Presidential republic One-party state	24 October 1964	2 November 1991	Yes
31	Paul Kagame	9,696	26 years, 200 days	Rwanda	Semi-presidential republic Authoritarian dictatorship	22 April 2000	incumbent	Yes
32	Islam Karimov	9,652	26 years, 162 days	Uzbekistan	Semi-presidential republic Authoritarian regime	24 March 1990	2 September 2016	Yes
33	Urho Kekkonen	9,463	25 years, 332 days	Finland	Parliamentary republic	1 March 1956	27 January 1982	Yes
34	Ahmed Sékou Touré	9,301	25 years, 176 days	Guinea	Presidential republic One-party state Authoritarian regime	2 October 1958	26 March 1984	Yes
35	Mathieu Kérékou	9,281	25 years, 156 days	Benin	Presidential republic Authoritarian regime	30 November 1975	1 March 1990	No
36	Chiang Kai-shek	9,125	25 years, 36 days	Republic of China	Semi-presidential republic One-party state Authoritarian regime	1 March 1950	5 April 1975	Yes
37	Daniel Ortega	9,083	24 years, 317 days	Nicaragua	Authoritarian dictatorship	10 January 1985	incumbent	No
38	Lansana Conté	9,024	24 years, 263 days	Guinea	Presidential republic Military dictatorship Authoritarian regime	3 April 1984	22 December 2008	Yes
40	Bashar al-Assad	8,904	24 years, 144 days	Ba'athist Syria	Presidential republic Totalitarian dictatorship	17 July 2000	8 December 2024	Yes
39	Daniel arap Moi	8,890	24 years, 130 days	Kenya	Presidential republic One-party state Authoritarian regime	22 August 1978	30 December 2002	Yes
41	Sir Dawda Jawara	8,849	24 years, 89 days	The Gambia	Presidential republic	24 April 1970	22 July 1994	Yes
42	Saddam Hussein	8,662	23 years, 267 days	Ba'athist Iraq	Presidential republic Totalitarian dictatorship	16 July 1979	9 April 2003	Yes
43	Ho Chi Minh	8,640	23 years, 239 days	North Vietnam	Communist state	6 January 1946	2 September 1969	Yes
44	Joaquín Balaguer	8,613	23 years, 218 days	Dominican Republic	Presidential republic Authoritarian regime	3 August 1960	16 August 1996	No
45	Zine El Abidine Ben Ali	8,463	23 years, 68 days	Tunisia	Presidential republic One-party state Authoritarian regime	7 November 1987	14 January 2011	Yes
46	Ilham Aliyev	8,409	23 years, 8 days	Azerbaijan	Semi-presidential republic Authoritarian dictatorship	31 October 2003	incumbent	Yes
47	Vladimir Putin	8,220	22 years, 185 days	Russia	Semi-presidential republic Authoritarian regime	7 May 2012	incumbent	No
48	Moussa Traoré	8,157	22 years, 127 days	Mali	Presidential republic One-party state Military dictatorship	19 November 1968	26 March 1991	No
49	Manuel Estrada Cabrera	8,101	22 years, 67 days	Guatemala	Presidential republic Authoritarian regime	8 February 1898	15 April 1920	Yes
50	João Bernardo Vieira	7,993	21 years, 328 days	Guinea-Bissau	Semi-presidential republic Military dictatorship	14 November 1980	2 March 2009	No
51	Hassan Gouled Aptidon	7,985	21 years, 315 days	Djibouti	Presidential republic Authoritarian dictatorship	27 June 1977	8 May 1999	Yes
52	Ali Abdullah Saleh	7,949	21 years, 279 days	Yemen	Semi-presidential republic Authoritarian regime	22 May 1990	25 February 2012	Yes
53	Kim Il Sung	7,862	21 years, 192 days	North Korea	Communist state	28 December 1972	8 July 1994	Yes
54	Siad Barre	7,762	21 years, 97 days	Somali Democratic Republic	Communist state	21 October 1969	26 January 1991	Yes
55	Ahmadou Ahidjo	7,665	21 years, 36 days	Cameroon	Presidential republic Authoritarian dictatorship	1 October 1961	6 November 1982	Yes
56	Julius Nyerere	7,769	21 years, 4 days	Tanzania	Presidential socialist republic One-party state	1 November 1964	5 November 1985	Yes
57	Juvénal Habyarimana	7,575	20 years, 275 days	Rwanda	Semi-presidential republic Authoritarian dictatorship	5 July 1973	6 April 1994	Yes
58	Maaouya Ould Sid'Ahmed Taya	7,534	20 years, 234 days	Mauritania	Semi-presidential republic Authoritarian regime	12 December 1984	3 August 2005	Yes
59	Rafael Carrera	7,426	20 years, 121 days	Guatemala	Presidential republic One-party state Military dictatorship	14 December 1844	14 April 1865	No
60	Léopold Sédar Senghor	7,416	20 years, 116 days	Senegal	Semi-presidential republic	6 September 1960	31 December 1980	Yes
61	Yahya Jammeh	7,376	20 years, 76 days	The Gambia	Presidential republic	6 November 1996	21 January 2017	Yes
62	Ferdinand Marcos	7,362	20 years, 57 days	Philippines	Presidential republic	30 December 1965	25 February 1986	Yes
63	Faure Gnassingbé	7,319	20 years, 19 days	Togo	Parliamentary republic Authoritarian dictatorship	5 February 2005	3 May 2025	No
64	Ólafur Ragnar Grímsson	7,305	19 years, 364 days	Iceland	Parliamentary republic	1 August 1996	31 July 2016	Yes
65	Abdelaziz Bouteflika	7,275	19 years, 340 days	Algeria	Semi-presidential republic	27 April 1999	2 April 2019	Yes
66	Abdou Diouf	7,026	19 years, 91 days	Senegal	Semi-presidential republic	1 January 1981	1 April 2000	Yes
67	Getúlio Vargas	6,775	18 years, 184 days	Brazil	Provisional government Presidential republic Corporatist dictatorship	3 November 1930	24 August 1954	No
68	Carlos Antonio López	6,771	18 years, 181 days	Paraguay	Presidential republic	13 March 1844	10 September 1862	Yes
69	Joaquim Chissano	6,658	18 years, 88 days	Mozambique	Presidential republic	6 November 1986	2 February 2005	Yes
70	Rafael Trujillo	6,574	18 years	Dominican Republic	Authoritarian dictatorship	16 August 1930	16 August 1952	No
71	Joseph Kabila	6,568	17 years, 363 days	Congo-Kinshasa	Presidential republic Authoritarian dictatorship	17 January 2001	24 January 2019	Yes
72	Jamsrangiin Sambuu	6,528	17 years, 319 days	Socialist Mongolia	Communist state	7 July 1954	21 May 1972	Yes
73	Didier Ratsiraka	6,490	17 years, 285 days	Madagascar	Semi-presidential republic	15 June 1975	27 March 1993	Yes
74	Quett Masire	6,461	17 years, 256 days	Botswana	Parliamentary republic	18 July 1980	31 March 1998	Yes
75	Moktar Ould Daddah	6,429	17 years, 224 days	Mauritania	Semi-presidential republic	28 November 1960	10 July 1978	Yes
76	Park Chung Hee	6,425	17 years, 216 days	South Korea	Presidential republic Semi-presidential republic Military dictatorship	24 March 1962	26 October 1979	Yes
77	Osvaldo Dorticós Torrado	6,346	17 years, 137 days	Cuba	Communist state	18 July 1959	2 December 1976	Yes
78	Amata Kabua	6,242	17 years, 33 days	Marshall Islands	Parliamentary republic	17 November 1979	20 December 1996	Yes
79	Anastasio Somoza Garcia	6,105	16 years, 265 days	Nicaragua	Authoritarian dictatorship	1 January 1937	29 September 1956	No
80	Augusto Pinochet	6,021	16 years, 181 days	Chile	Military dictatorship	11 September 1973	11 March 1990	Yes
81	Saparmurat Niyazov	5,889	16 years, 49 days	Turkmenistan	Presidential republic Authoritarian dictatorship	2 November 1990	21 December 2006	Yes
82	Ásgeir Ásgeirsson	5,844	15 years, 364 days	Iceland	Parliamentary republic	1 August 1952	31 July 1968	Yes
82	Vigdís Finnbogadóttir	5,844	15 years, 364 days	Iceland	Parliamentary republic	1 August 1980	31 July 1996	Yes
83	Tiburcio Carías Andino	5,814	15 years, 339 days	Honduras	Presidential republic Authoritarian regime	27 April 1924	1 January 1949	No
84	Alassane Ouattara	5,818	15 years, 339 days	Ivory Coast	Presidential republic	4 December 2010	incumbent	Yes
85	Gamal Abdel Nasser	5,794	15 years, 319 days	Egypt; United Arab Republic	Semi-presidential republic Military dictatorship Socialist republic	14 November 1954	28 September 1970	Yes
86	Nicolae Ceaușescu	5,765	15 years, 269 days	Socialist Romania	Communist state	28 March 1974	22 December 1989	Yes
87	Manuel Pinto da Costa	5,710	15 years, 235 days	São Tomé and Príncipe	Presidential republic One-party state Authoritarian regime	12 July 1975	4 March 1991	Yes
88	Salva Kiir	5,601	15 years, 122 days	South Sudan	Presidential republic Authoritarian regime	9 July 2011	incumbent	Yes
89	Gurbanguly Berdimuhamedow	5,508	15 years, 33 days	Turkmenistan	Presidential republic Authoritarian dictatorship	21 December 2006	19 March 2022	Yes
90	Mustafa Kemal Atatürk	5,487	15 years, 12 days	Turkey	Presidential republic One-party state Authoritarian regime	29 October 1923	10 November 1938	Yes
91	Blaise Compaoré	5,347	14 years, 327 days	Burkina Faso	Semi-presidential republic Authoritarian dictatorship	3 January 1966	25 November 1980	Yes
92	Jean-Claude Duvalier	5,402	14 years, 292 days	Haiti	Authoritarian dictatorship	21 April 1971	7 February 1986	Yes
93	Pierre Nkurunziza	5,397	14 years, 287 days	Burundi	Presidential republic Authoritarian dictatorship	26 August 2005	8 June 2020	Yes
94	Antanas Smetona	5,365	14 years, 255 days	Lithuania	Parliamentary republic Authoritarian regime	4 April 1919	15 June 1940	No
95	François Tombalbaye	5,355	14 years, 245 days	Chad	Presidential republic One-party state Authoritarian regime	11 August 1960	13 April 1975	Yes
96	Siaka Stevens	5,331	14 years, 221 days	Sierra Leone	Presidential republic One-party state Authoritarian regime	21 April 1971	28 November 1985	Yes
97	Benito Juárez	5,323	14 years, 213 days	Mexico	Presidential republic	18 December 1857	18 July 1872	Yes
98	Xi Jinping	5,298	14 years, 185 days	China	Communist state	7 May 2012	incumbent	Yes
99	Askar Akayev	5,258	14 years, 148 days	Kyrgyzstan	Presidential republic Authoritarian regime	27 October 1990	24 March 2005	Yes
100	Ulises Heureaux	5,257	14 years, 147 days	Dominican Republic	Presidential republic One-party state Authoritarian regime	1 September 1882	26 July 1899	No
101	Hugo Chávez	5,145	14 years, 29 days	Venezuela	Socialist dictatorship	2 February 1999	5 March 2013	No
102	Seán T. O'Kelly	5,110	13 years, 364 days	Ireland	Parliamentary republic	25 June 1945	25 June 1959	Yes
102	Éamon de Valera	5,110	13 years, 364 days	Ireland	Parliamentary republic	25 June 1959	24 June 1973	Yes
102	Patrick Hillery	5,110	13 years, 364 days	Ireland	Parliamentary republic	3 December 1976	2 December 1990	Yes
103	François Mitterrand	5,109	13 years, 361 days	France	Semi-presidential republic	21 May 1981	17 May 1995	Yes
104	Makarios III	5,078	13 years, 333 days	Cyprus	Presidential republic	16 August 1960	15 July 1974	Yes
105	Ali Bongo	5,063	13 years, 318 days	Gabon	Presidential republic Authoritarian regime	16 October 2009	30 August 2023	Yes
106	Seretse Khama	5,032	13 years, 287 days	Botswana	Parliamentary republic	30 September 1966	13 July 1980	Yes
107	Gaafar Nimeiry	5,003	13 years, 258 days	Sudan	Presidential republic One-party state Military dictatorship	22 July 1971	6 April 1985	Yes
108	Jomo Kenyatta	4,998	13 years, 253 days	Kenya	Presidential republic One-party state Authoritarian regime	12 December 1964	22 August 1978	Yes
109	Seyni Kountché	4,954	13 years, 209 days	Niger	Semi-presidential republic One-party state Military dictatorship	15 April 1974	10 November 1987	Yes
110	François Duvalier	4,939	13 years, 181 days	Haiti	Authoritarian dictatorship	22 October 1957	21 April 1971	Yes
111	Hamani Diori	4,901	13 years, 156 days	Niger	Semi-presidential republic One-party state Authoritarian regime	10 November 1960	15 April 1974	Yes
112	Jorge Ubico	4,883	13 years, 138 days	Guatemala	Presidential republic One-party state Military dictatorship	14 February 1931	1 July 1944	Yes
113	Edwin Barclay	4,776	13 years, 31 days	Liberia	Presidential republic One-party state Authoritarian regime	December 3, 1930	January 3, 1944	Yes
114	Chadli Bendjedid	4,716	12 years, 336 days	Algeria	Presidential republic One-party state Authoritarian regime	9 February 1979	11 January 1992	Yes
115	Anote Tong	4,628	12 years, 245 days	Kiribati	Parliamentary republic	10 July 2003	11 March 2016	Yes
116	Abdel Fattah el-Sisi	4,536	12 years, 153 days	Egypt	Semi-presidential republic Authoritarian regime	8 June 2014	incumbent	Yes
117	Bharrat Jagdeo	4,494	12 years, 114 days	Guyana	Parliamentary republic	11 August 1999	3 December 2011	Yes
118	Rajendra Prasad	4,487	12 years, 107 days	India	Parliamentary republic	26 January 1950	13 May 1962	Yes
119	Philibert Tsiranana	4,487	12 years, 107 days	Madagascar	Semi-presidential republic Dominant-party state Authoritarian regime	26 June 1960	11 October 1972	Yes
120	James Michel	4,474	12 years, 94 days	Seychelles	Presidential republic	14 July 2004	16 October 2016	Yes
121	Franklin D. Roosevelt	4,422	12 years, 39 days	United States	Presidential republic	4 March 1933	12 April 1945	Yes
122	Mauno Koivisto	4,416	12 years, 33 days	Finland	Parliamentary republic	27 January 1982	1 March 1994	Yes
123	Abdoulaye Wade	4,384	12 years, 1 day	Senegal	Semi-presidential republic Authoritarian regime	1 April 2000	2 April 2012	Yes
124	Tarja Halonen	4,383	12 years	Finland	Parliamentary republic	1 March 2000	1 March 2012	Yes
124	Sauli Niinistö	4,383	12 years	Finland	Parliamentary republic	1 March 2012	1 March 2024	Yes
124	S. R. Nathan	4,383	12 years	Singapore	Parliamentary republic	1 September 1999	1 September 2011	Yes
124	Rudolf Kirchschläger	4,383	12 years	Austria	Semi-presidential republic	8 July 1974	8 July 1986	Yes
124	Heinz Fischer	4,383	12 years	Austria	Semi-presidential republic	8 July 2004	8 July 2016	Yes
124	Macky Sall	4,383	12 years	Senegal	Semi-presidential republic	2 April 2012	2 April 2024	Yes
125	Julio Argentino Roca	4,382	11 years, 364 days	Argentina	Presidential republic	12 October 1880	11 October 1904	No
126	Jacques Chirac	4,382	11 years, 364 days	France	Semi-presidential republic	17 May 1995	16 May 2007	Yes
127	Girma Wolde-Giorgis	4,382	11 years, 364 days	Ethiopia	Parliamentary republic	8 October 2001	7 October 2013	Yes
128	Thomas Klestil	4,381	11 years, 363 days	Austria	Semi-presidential republic	8 July 1992	6 July 2004	Yes
129	Filip Vujanović	4,366	11 years, 351 days	Montenegro	Parliamentary republic	3 June 2006	20 May 2018	Yes
131	Maximiliano Hernández Martínez	4,355	11 years, 340 days	El Salvador	Presidential republic	4 December 1931	9 May 1944	No
130	Luiz Inácio Lula da Silva	4,329	11 years, 311 days	Brazil	Presidential republic	1 January 2003	incumbent	No
132	Justo Rufino Barrios	4,317	11 years, 302 days	Guatemala	Presidential republic	4 June 1873	2 April 1885	Yes
133	Rhee Syng-man	4,295	11 years, 278 days	South Korea	Presidential republic Dictatorship	24 July 1948	27 April 1960	Yes
134	Sergio Mattarella	4,296	11 years, 278 days	Italy	Parliamentary republic	3 February 2015	incumbent	Yes
135	İsmet İnönü	4,207	11 years, 192 days	Turkey	Presidential republic	11 November 1938	22 May 1950	Yes
136	Samora Machel	4,134	11 years, 116 days	Mozambique	Socialist republic	25 June 1975	19 October 1986	Yes
137	Simón Bolívar	4,096	11 years, 78 days	Colombia	Presidential republic	15 February 1819	4 May 1830	Yes
138	Ahmed Abdallah	4,069	11 years, 54 days	Comoros	Presidential republic	3 October 1978	26 November 1989	Yes
139	Anwar Sadat	4,023	11 years, 8 days	United Arab Republic; Egypt	Socialist republic Semi-presidential republic	28 September 1970	6 October 1981	Yes
140	Chandrika Kumaratunga	4,022	11 years, 7 days	Sri Lanka	Semi-presidential republic	12 November 1994	19 November 2005	Yes
141	Grégoire Kayibanda	4,019	11 years, 4 days	Rwanda	Semi-presidential republic Authoritarian dictatorship	1 July 1962	5 July 1973	Yes
142	J. R. Jayewardene	4,014	10 years, 364 days	Sri Lanka	Semi-presidential republic	4 February 1978	2 January 1989	Yes
143	Ahmed Hassan al-Bakr	4,014	10 years, 364 days	Ba'athist Iraq	Presidential republic Totalitarian dictatorship	17 July 1968	16 July 1979	Yes
144	Milan Kučan	4,014	10 years, 364 days	Slovenia	Parliamentary republic	23 December 1991	22 December 2002	Yes
145	Ion Iliescu	3,993	10 years, 343 days	Romania	Semi-presidential republic	26 December 1989	20 December 2004	No
146	Jean-Bédel Bokassa	3,988	10 years, 338 days	Central African Republic	Presidential republic	1 January 1966	4 December 1976	Yes
147	Wilhelm Pieck	3,982	10 years, 332 days	East Germany	Communist state	11 October 1949	7 September 1960	Yes
148	Souphanouvong	3,981	10 years, 331 days	Laos	Communist state	2 December 1975	29 October 1986	Yes
149	Jean-Baptiste Bagaza	3,956	10 years, 306 days	Burundi	Presidential republic Authoritarian dictatorship	1 November 1976	3 September 1987	Yes
150	Francisco Macías Nguema	3,945	10 years, 295 days	Equatorial Guinea	Presidential republic Authoritarian dictatorship	12 October 1968	3 August 1979	Yes
151	Evo Morales	3,926	10 years, 276 days	Bolivia	Presidential republic	7 February 2009	10 November 2019	Yes
152	Alpha Condé	3,908	10 years, 258 days	Guinea	Presidential republic	21 December 2010	5 September 2021	Yes
153	Taneti Maamau	3,894	10 years, 242 days	Kiribati	Parliamentary republic	11 March 2016	incumbent	Yes
154	Sir Ellis Clarke	3,882	10 years, 230 days	Trinidad and Tobago	Parliamentary republic	1 August 1976	19 March 1987	Yes
155	Faustin-Archange Touadéra	3,875	10 years, 223 days	Central African Republic	Presidential republic	30 March 2016	incumbent	No
156	Tôn Đức Thắng	3,860	10 years, 210 days	Vietnam	Communist state	2 July 1976	30 March 1980	Yes
157	Spyros Kyprianou	3,859	10 years, 209 days	Cyprus	Presidential republic	3 August 1977	28 February 1988	Yes
158	Arthur Chung	3,853	10 years, 203 days	Guyana	Presidential republic	17 March 1970	6 October 1980	Yes
159	Ernest Bai Koroma	3,849	10 years, 199 days	Sierra Leone	Presidential republic	17 September 2007	4 April 2018	Yes
160	Pedro Pires	3,821	10 years, 171 days	Cabo Verde	Semi-presidential republic	22 March 2001	9 September 2011	Yes
161	Laurent Gbagbo	3,819	10 years, 167 days	Ivory Coast	Presidential republic	26 October 2000	11 April 2011	Yes
162	Benjamin Sheares	3,780	10 years, 130 days	Singapore	Parliamentary republic	2 January 1971	12 May 1981	Yes
163	Yitzhak Ben-Zvi	3,778	10 years, 128 days	Israel	Parliamentary republic	16 December 1952	23 April 1963	Yes
164	Alberto Fujimori	3,766	10 years, 116 days	Peru	Presidential republic	28 July 1990	22 November 2000	Yes
165	Charles de Gaulle	3,763	10 years, 113 days	France	Semi-presidential republic	8 January 1959	28 April 1969	Yes
166	Mwai Kibaki	3,750	10 years, 100 days	Kenya	Presidential republic	30 December 2002	9 April 2013	Yes
167	Árpád Göncz	3,743	10 years, 93 days	Hungary	Parliamentary republic	2 May 1990	3 August 2000	Yes
168	Frederick Chiluba	3,711	10 years, 61 days	Zambia	Presidential republic	2 November 1991	2 January 2002	Yes
168	Jorge Carlos Fonseca	3,711	10 years, 61 days	Cabo Verde	Semi-presidential republic	9 September 2011	9 November 2021	Yes
169	Mamadou Tandja	3,708	10 years, 58 days	Niger	Semi-presidential republic	22 December 1999	18 February 2010	Yes
170	Raúl Castro	3,704	10 years, 54 days	Cuba	Communist state	24 February 2008	19 April 2018	Yes
171	Klaus Iohannis	3,703	10 years, 53 days	Romania	Semi-presidential republic	21 December 2014	12 February 2025	Yes
172	Patrice Talon	3,698	10 years, 48 days	Benin	Presidential republic	6 April 2016	24 May 2026	Yes
173	Mohammad Abdul Hamid	3,691	10 years, 41 days	Bangladesh	Parliamentary republic	14 March 2013	24 April 2023	Yes
174	Abdrabbuh Mansour Hadi	3,689	10 years, 39 days	Yemen	Semi-presidential republic	27 February 2012	7 April 2022	Yes
175	Zalman Shazar	3,681	10 years, 31 days	Israel	Parliamentary republic	23 April 1963	24 May 1973	Yes
176	Benjamin Mkapa	3,678	10 years, 28 days	Tanzania	Presidential republic	23 November 1995	21 December 2005	Yes
177	Heydar Aliyev	3,671	10 years, 21 days	Azerbaijan	Semi-presidential republic Authoritarian dictatorship	10 October 1993	31 October 2003	Yes
178	Ali Hassan Mwinyi	3,668	10 years, 18 days	Tanzania	Presidential republic	5 November 1985	23 November 1995	Yes
179	François Bozizé	3,659	10 years, 9 days	Central African Republic	Presidential republic	15 March 2003	24 March 2013	Yes
180	Chaim Herzog	3,658	10 years, 8 days	Israel	Parliamentary republic	5 May 1983	13 May 1993	Yes
181	Celâl Bayar	3,655	10 years, 5 days	Turkey	Presidential republic	22 May 1950	27 May 1960	Yes
182	Konstantinos Stephanopoulos	3,652	10 years, 2 days	Greece	Parliamentary republic	10 March 1995	12 March 2005	Yes
183	Traian Băsescu	3,651	10 years, 1 day	Romania	Semi-presidential republic	20 December 2004	21 December 2014	Yes
183	George Maxwell Richards	3,651	10 years, 1 day	Trinidad and Tobago	Parliamentary republic	17 March 2003	18 March 2013	Yes
183	Toomas Hendrik Ilves	3,651	10 years, 1 day	Estonia	Parliamentary republic	9 October 2006	10 October 2016	Yes
183	Karolos Papoulias	3,651	10 years, 1 day	Greece	Parliamentary republic	12 March 2005	13 March 2015	Yes
184	Susilo Bambang Yudhoyono	3,650	10 years	Indonesia	Presidential republic	20 October 2004	20 October 2014	Yes
184	Joko Widodo	3,650	10 years	Indonesia	Presidential republic	20 October 2019	20 October 2024	Yes
184	Mário Soares	3,650	10 years	Portugal	Semi-presidential republic	9 March 1986	9 March 1996	Yes
184	Jorge Sampaio	3,650	10 years	Portugal	Semi-presidential republic	9 March 1996	9 March 2006	Yes
184	Aníbal Cavaco Silva	3,650	10 years	Portugal	Semi-presidential republic	9 March 2006	9 March 2016	Yes
184	Marcelo Rebelo de Sousa	3,650	10 years	Portugal	Semi-presidential republic	9 March 2016	9 March 2026	Yes
184	Joaquín Prieto	3,650	10 years	Chile	Presidential republic	18 September 1831	18 September 1841	Yes
184	Manuel Bulnes	3,650	10 years	Chile	Presidential republic	18 September 1841	18 September 1851	Yes
184	Manuel Montt	3,650	10 years	Chile	Presidential republic	18 September 1851	18 September 1861	Yes
184	Aleksander Kwaśniewski	3,650	10 years	Poland	Parliamentary republic	23 December 1995	23 December 2005	Yes
184	Andrzej Duda	3,650	10 years	Poland	Parliamentary republic	6 August 2015	6 August 2025	Yes
184	Ibrahim Nasir	3,650	10 years	Maldives	Presidential republic	11 November 1968	11 November 1978	Yes
184	Robert Kocharyan	3,650	10 years	Armenia	Parliamentary republic	9 April 1998	9 April 2008	Yes
184	Serzh Sargsyan	3,650	10 years	Armenia	Parliamentary republic	9 April 2008	9 April 2018	Yes
184	Dalia Grybauskaitė	3,650	10 years	Lithuania	Parliamentary republic	12 July 2009	12 July 2019	Yes
184	Glafcos Clerides	3,650	10 years	Cyprus	Presidential republic	28 February 1993	28 February 2003	Yes
184	Nicos Anastasiades	3,650	10 years	Cyprus	Presidential republic	28 February 2013	28 February 2023	Yes
184	Georgi Parvanov	3,650	10 years	Bulgaria	Parliamentary republic	22 January 2002	22 January 2012	Yes
184	Václav Havel	3,650	10 years	Czech Republic	Parliamentary republic	2 February 1993	2 February 2003	Yes
184	Václav Klaus	3,650	10 years	Czech Republic	Parliamentary republic	7 March 2003	7 March 2013	Yes
184	Miloš Zeman	3,650	10 years	Czech Republic	Parliamentary republic	8 March 2013	8 March 2023	Yes
184	János Áder	3,650	10 years	Hungary	Parliamentary republic	10 May 2012	10 May 2022	Yes
184	Ivan Gašparovič	3,650	10 years	Slovakia	Parliamentary republic	15 June 2004	15 June 2014	Yes
184	Gjorge Ivanov	3,650	10 years	North Macedonia	Parliamentary republic	12 May 2009	12 May 2019	Yes
184	Alpha Oumar Konaré	3,650	10 years	Mali	Presidential republic	8 June 1992	8 June 2002	Yes
184	Festus Mogae	3,650	10 years	Botswana	Parliamentary republic	1 April 1998	1 April 2008	Yes
184	Ian Khama	3,650	10 years	Botswana	Parliamentary republic	1 April 2008	1 April 2018	Yes
184	Bakili Muluzi	3,650	10 years	Malawi	Presidential republic	24 May 1994	24 May 2004	Yes
184	António Mascarenhas Monteiro	3,650	10 years	Cabo Verde	Semi-presidential republic	22 March 1991	22 March 2001	Yes
184	Thomas Boni Yayi	3,650	10 years	Benin	Presidential republic	6 April 2006	6 April 2016	Yes
