= Corruption in Algeria =

Corruption in Algeria is considered a serious problem. Algeria has long struggled with deeply entrenched corruption, affecting sectors such as politics, business, and public services. The country ranked 109th out of 182 countries in Transparency International’s 2025 Corruption Perceptions Index, highlighting the widespread nature of the problem. Recent incidents of corruption have involved high-ranking government officials, particularly in the energy sector. As an OPEC member, Algeria relies heavily on its substantial oil reserves, which is considered the second largest in Africa. The country also supplies 15 percent of Europe’s natural gas requirements.

== Corruption cases ==
In 2015, one of the most controversial corruption scandals in Algeria came to light and it involved the country’s state-owned enterprise, Sonatrach. The company is one of the largest hydro-carbon companies in the world, underscoring its role in Algeria as the oil and gas sector remains the backbone of its economy. The case entailed the controversial purchase of the Augusta refinery in Italy, which cost $800 million despite being in a state of disrepair. The facility also required a significant amount of investment so that it satisfied the European environmental standards. Initially, several of the company's executives were charged with corruption and money laundering, including the CEO and President Mohamed Meziane. The previous CEO Abdelmounem Ould Kaddour was also convicted and punished with a 15-year imprisonment.

Sonatrach was also accused in 2020 of delivering adulterated fuel to Lebanon in 2020, involving a number of Lebanese inspection officials in "corruption, payment of bribes, fraud, and breach of trust." This particular scandal is notable because it involved Farid Bedjaoui, a Lebanese citizen. He is notorious for his participation in several corruption cases in Algeria, including the diversion of up to $15 million to the associates and family of Chekib Kelil, the Algerian energy minister from 1999 to 2010. Khelil was part of Interpol's wanted list in 2013 and 2019. Meziane and other senior executives of Sonatrach were also placed under judicial supervision in 2010 after they faced charges of corruption in the awarding of contracts. Almost all of the company's upper management were replaced as investigations commenced.

Another high-profile corruption case in Algeria was the East-West scandal, which involved the construction of a major infrastructure project, the 1,216-kilometer highway passing through Algeria that will link Morocco and Tunisia. From an initial budget of $6 billion, the project’s cost reached $17 billion due to widespread corruption. According to reports, as much as $5 billion worth of bribes were paid during the construction. Fourteen people were found guilty of corruption, embezzlement of public funds, and money laundering. This included high-ranking officials from the Ministry of Public Works. The former justice and foreign minister Mohamed Bedjaoui was also implicated.

== Impact ==
The impact of corruption, particularly in the energy sector, has disrupted Algerian economic development as funds intended for development projects and essential services are diverted through corruption. This is highlighted amid the depletion of the Algerian foreign exchange reserve from oil and gas. By 2019, it stood at 57 billion euros down from 162.4 billion euros. This decline in assets is further aggravated by falling fuel prices and the coronavirus pandemic, prompting the IMF to predict an Algerian economic recession in 2020. Around 2022, Algeria sold its crude close to production costs at a fiscal breakeven price of $157. During this period, the IMF estimated that the economy has contracted by -5.2%. Misappropriated funds and declining revenues had forced the Algerian government to adopt a 20% budget shortfall in 2022. It also halted state projects due to a 50 percent reduction in public spending.

Aside from its adverse effects on the economy, corruption also undermines public trust in institutions. Investor confidence is also affected by the cases of financial misconduct in the Algerian public sector. The country has incurred reduced foreign investment due to the lack of confidence in the country’s governance.

== International rankings ==
In Transparency International's 2025 Corruption Perceptions Index, Algeria scored 34 on a scale from 0 ("highly corrupt") to 100 ("very clean"). When ranked by score, Algeria ranked 109th among the 182 countries in the Index, where the country ranked first is perceived to have the most honest public sector. For comparison with regional scores, the best score among Middle Eastern and North African countries (Note: Algeria, Bahrain, Egypt, Iran, Iraq, Israel, Jordan, Kuwait, Lebanon, Libya, Morocco, Oman, Qatar, Saudi Arabia, Syria, Tunisia, United Arab Emirates, and Yemen) was 69, the average was 39 and the worst was 13. For comparison with worldwide scores, the best score was 89 (ranked 1), the average was 42, and the worst was 9 (ranked 181 in a two-way tie).
