= 1989 Algerian constitutional referendum =

23 February 1989

Results
Choice	Votes	%
Yes	7,290,760	73.43%
No	2,637,678	26.57%
Valid votes	9,928,438	95.45%
Invalid or blank votes	473,110	4.55%
Total votes	10,401,548	100.00%
Registered voters/turnout	13,170,137	78.98%

A constitutional referendum was held in Algeria on 23 February 1989. Coming after the 1988 October Riots, the new constitution removed references to socialism and allowed for multi-party democracy. Despite calls for a boycott by radical Islamists and opposition from trade unions and FLN members, the amendments were approved by 73% of voters with a 79% turnout. Local elections were scheduled for the following year, with parliamentary elections to be held in 1991.

== Results ==
Choice	Votes	%
For	7,290,760	73.43
Against	2,637,678	26.57
Total	9,928,438	100.00
Valid votes	9,928,438	95.45
Invalid/blank votes	473,110	4.55
Total votes	10,401,548	100.00
Registered voters/turnout	13,170,137	78.98
Source: Nohlen et al.
