= Constitution of Algeria =

Supreme law of Algeria

Constitution of the People's Democratic Republic of Algeria
- Emblem of Algeria

Overview
- Jurisdiction: Algeria
- Ratified: 10 September 1963; 62 years ago
- Date effective: 10 September 1963; 62 years ago
- System: Unitary semi-presidential republic

Government structure
- Branches: Three (Executive, Legislature and Judiciary)
- Head of state: President of Algeria
- Chambers: Bicameral (Council of the Nation and People's National Assembly)
- Executive: Prime minister–led cabinet responsible to the lower house of the parliament
- Judiciary: Supreme Court
- Last amended: 7 February 2016
- Author: National Liberation Front

An Algerian Constitution (Arabic: دستور الجزائر, romanized: Dustūr al-Jazāʼir) was first adopted by a referendum in 1963, following the Algerian War of Independence (1954–62); originally, it was to be drafted by a constitutional assembly led by Ferhat Abbas, but this body was sidelined by Algeria's first President, Ahmed Ben Bella. In its 1963 form, the constitution declared Algeria a one-party state ruled by the former resistance movement, the National Liberation Front (FLN). This constitution was suspended by the military coup d'état of 1965. After years of ruling by executive fiat as leader of the Revolutionary Council, Houari Boumédienne issued a second constitution in 1976, emphasizing the importance of socialism and - formally - restoring political institutions to their primacy over the military establishment. (Boumédienne was then elected the country's second president, after having left the post vacant for eleven years.)

In 1986, Boumedienne's successor Chadli Bendjedid modified the constitution to allow for free-market reforms, and, after the 1988 October Riots, brought in a new constitution in 1988. This was approved in a referendum by 73% on 23 February 1989. It introduced a multi-party system, removing the FLN from its role as leading party, and made no mention of socialism; instead it promised "freedom of expression, association, and assembly". A 1992 military coup introduced a state of emergency, which suspended parts of the new constitution, as the Algerian Civil War began.

In 1996, the constitution was further modified, allowing the formation of political parties not "founded on a religious, linguistic, racial, sex, corporatist or regional basis" or violating "the fundamental liberties, the fundamental values and components of the national identity, the national unity, the security and integrity of the national territory, the independence of the country and the People's sovereignty as well as the democratic and republican nature of the State."

A further proposed revision, believed to be intended to remove the presidential term limit (Article 74) to allow the President to run for office indefinitely, was discussed during 2006 by Prime Minister Abdelaziz Belkhadem's government. This was widely seen to be instigated by President Abdelaziz Bouteflika, who had been elected to his second and, constitutionally, final mandate in 2004. Other changes discussed concerned a move towards a presidential system, introducing the post of Vice President among other things.

A new constitution was adopted in 2020 in a national referendum that had very low turnout. Changes included adding term limits for the president as well as new powers for the parliament and judiciary.

== Modifications to the Constitution ==
The 1996 constitution was modified in 2008 and amended by 2016 Constitution. Before Algeria the 1996 constitution Algeria had a constitution referendum in 1989.

== See also ==
- Constitution
- Constitutional law
- Constitutional economics
- Constitutionalism
