= Algerian constitutional amendment of 2016 =

The Algerian constitutional amendment of 2016 is a constitutional revision which introduced numerous amendments to the constitution adopted in 1996. The proposed amendment was presented on 4 February 2016 by prime minister Abdelmalek Sellal and then adopted on 7 February 2016.
