= Supreme Court of Algeria =

Highest court of appeal in Algeria

- المحكمة العليا
- Interactive map of Supreme Court of Algeria
- 36°45′14″N 3°3′32″E
- Established: 18 June 1963
- Location: Algiers, Algeria
- Coordinates: 36°45′14″N 3°3′32″E

The Supreme Court of Algeria (Arabic: المحكمة العليا, romanized: al-Maḥkamah al-ʻUlyā) is the highest court of appeal in Algeria. It can only review lower court decisions on questions of procedure. When overruled the case will be returned to the lower courts for retrial.

The court is located in Algiers, and was created by Law 218/63. Its judicial authority is defined by Law 22/89. Its president is Sulayman Budi, and the attorney general is Ben 'Ubayd al-Wardi.
