= List of the first women holders of political offices in Africa =

This is a list of political offices in Africa which have been held by a woman, with details of the first woman holder of each office. It is ordered by the countries in Africa and by dates of appointment. Please observe that this list is meant to contain only the first woman to hold of a political office, and not all the female holders of that office.

== Algeria ==
=== Antiquity ===
- Monarch – Tin Hinan – 4th century

=== Republic ===
- Secretary of State of Social Affairs – Z'hour Ounissi – 1982
- Vice-Minister of Education – Leila Khira Taib – 1984
- Minister of Social Affairs – Z'hour Ounissi – 1984
- Minister of Education (And third in the Cabinet) – Z'hour Ounissi – 1986
- Minister of Health – Nafissa Lalliam – 1991
- Minister of Youth and Sports – Leïla Aslaoui – 1991
- Minister of State for National Solidarity – Saida Benhabyles – 1992
- Minister-Councillor for Juridical and Administrative Questions – Meriem Belmilhoub Zerdani – 1993
- Secretary of State for National Solidarity and the Family – Aïcha Hénia Semichi – 1995
- Minister of National Solidarity and Family – Rabéa Mechrane – 1997
- Secretary of State of Culture – Zahia Benarous – 1997
- Minister of Culture – Khalida Toumi – 2002; Nadia Labidi – 2014
- Minister of Education – Nouria Benghabrit-Remaoun – 2014
- Minister of Land-Use Planning and Environment – Dalila Boudjemaa – 2014
- Minister of Family and Women – Mounia Meslem – 2014
- Minister of Post, Information Technology and Communication Women – Zahra Dardouri – 2014
- Minister of Tourism – Nouria Yamina Zerhouni – 2014
- Minister of Artisana & Handicrafts – Aish Tabagho – 2014

== Angola ==
- Vice-Minister of Internal Trade – Maria Mambo Café – 1977
- Minister of Social Affairs – Maria Mambo Café – 1982
- Minister of Fisheries – Maria de Fátima Mateiro Jardim – 1992–2002
- Minister for Public Works and Urban Planning – Albina Faria de Assis Pereira Africano – 1992–1993
- Minister of Petroleum – Albina Faria de Assis Pereira Africano – 1993–1999
- Minister of Culture – Ana Maria de Oliveira – 1995–1999
- Minister of Women’s Affairs – Joana Lina Ramos Baptista Cristiano – 1997–1999
- Minister of Industry – Albina Faria de Assis Pereira Africano – 1999–2002
- Minister of Health – Albertina Julia Nauosse Hamukuya – 2000–2004
- Minister of Justice – Guilhermina Contreiras da Costa Prata – 2008–2012

== Benin ==
- Minister of Public Health – Rafiatou Karimou – 1989
- Minister of Labour and Social Affairs – Veronique Ahayo Ahogo – 1990–1993
- Minister of Commerce – Sikirath Kissira Aguemon – 1995
- Minister of Justice and Legislation, Keeper of the Seals – Grace d'Almeida – 1995–1996
- Minister of Education and Scientific Research – Conceptia Ouinsou – 1998
- Minister of Social Welfare and Women’s Condition – Ramatou Baba-Moussa – 1998–2000
- Minister of Technical Education and Vocational Training – Léa Hounkpè – 2003–2005
- Minister of Public Works and Transport – Marie Jeanne Omichessan – 2005–2006
- Foreign minister – Mariam Aladji Boni Diallo – 2006

== Botswana ==
- Minister of Trade and Industry – Gaositwe K.T. Chiepe – 1974
- Minister of Home Affairs – Kebatshabile Disele – 1980–1984
- Foreign minister – Gaositwe K.T. Chiepe – 1985
- Minister of Local Government, Lands and Housing – Margaret Nasha – 1997–1998
- Minister of Health – Joy Phymaphi – 1999–2003
- Chairperson of the House of Chiefs – Mosadi Seboko – 2003
- Minister of Justice – Lesego Motsumi – 2010–2011

== Burkina Faso ==
- Minister of Social Welfare, Housing and Labour – Célestine Ouezzin Coulibaly – 1958
- Minister of Social Affairs and the Condition of Women – Madame Traoré Moïse Alassane – 1978–1989
- Minister of National Education and Culture – Konaté Domba – 1978–1980
- Minister of Justice – Marie Louise Nignan-Bassolet – 1982–1983
- Minister of Finance – Bintou Sango – 1988–1999

== Burundi ==
- Minister for Women's Questions – Euphrasie Kandeke – 1982
- Prime Minister – Sylvie Kinigi – 1993
- President (acting) – Sylvie Kinigi – 1993
- Minister of Justice – Clotilde Niragira – 2005–2007
- Foreign minister – Antoinette Batumubwira – 2006

== Cameroon ==
- Member of Parliament (appointed) – Dorcas Idowu – 1955
- Member of Parliament (elected) – Julienne Keutcha – 1960
- Vice-Minister of Health and Public Welfare – Delphine Zanga Tsogo – 1970
- Minister of Social Affairs – Delphine Zanga Tsogo – 1975
- Secretary General of the Ministry of Justice – Feh Helen Kwanga Galega – 2020

== Cape Verde ==
- Minister for Fisheries, Agriculture and Rural Development – Maria Helena Nobre de Morais Querido Semedo – 1993
- Minister of Justice – Januaria Moreira – 1999–2001
- Foreign minister – Fátima Veiga – 2002
- Defence minister – Cristina Fontes Lima – 2006

== Central African Republic ==
- Member of Parliament – Marthe Matongo – 1964
- Government minister (Social Affairs) – Marie-Joséphe Franck – 1970
- Prime Minister – Elisabeth Domitien – 1975
- Minister of Finance – Marie-Christine Mboukou – 1975–1976
- Foreign minister – Léonie Banga-Bothy – 2013
- Head of State – Catherine Samba-Panza – 2014
- Minister of Justice – Isabelle Gaudeuille – 2014–2016

== Chad ==
- Minister of Parliament – Bourkou Louise Kabo – 1962
- Minister of Social Affairs and Women – Fatimé Kimto – 1982–1984
- Minister for Finance and Computer-Industry – Alina Mangodjo – 1994–1995
- Minister of Planning and Communication – Mariam Mahamat Nour – 1994–1996
- Minister of Environment and Water – Mariam Mahamat Nour – 1997–1998
- Minister of Youth and Sport – Koya Maiboula Dabovlai – 1999–2000
- Minister of Touristic Development – Akia Abouna – 2002–2003
- Minister of General State Control and Moralisation – Mariam Ali Moussa – 2004–2005

== Comoros ==
- Secretary of State for Population and the Condition of Women – Sittou Raghadat Mohamed – 1991 (First female appointed to a senior government position)
- Minister of Social Affairs, Labour and Employment – Sittou Raghadat Mohamed – 1993
- Member of the Assembly of the Union of the Comoros – Djoueria Abdallah – 2004

== Congo-Brazzaville ==
- Members of Parliament – Micheline Golengo, Pierrette Kombo and Mambou Aimée Gnali – 1963
- Minister of Public Service – Charlotte Kisimba – 1970
- Minister of Social Affairs – Emilie Manima – 1975
- Minister of Primary Education – Bernadette Bayone – 1984
- Minister of Labour and Social Affairs – Jeanne Dambendzet – 1989

== Democratic Republic of the Congo ==
=== Zaire ===
- Minister of Social Affairs – Sophie Kanza – 1967
- Foreign minister – Ekila Liyonda – 1987

=== Republic ===
- Chief of Staff (Prime Minister) – Marie-Thérèse Nlandu Mpolo Nene
- Speaker of the National Assembly – Jeanine Mabunda – 2019

== Djibouti ==
- Deputy Head of State – Khadija Abeba – 1992
- Cabinet member (Minister-Delegate for the Promotion of Women, Family and Social Affairs) – Hawa Ahmed Youssouf – 1999
- Cabinet Minister (Minister in charge of the Promotion of Women, Family Welfare and Social Affairs) – Aïcha Mohamed Robleh – 2005
- Minister of National Education and Higher Learning – Nimo Boulhan Houssein – 2009–2011
- Minister of Settlements, Urbanisation and Environment – Hasna Barkat Daoud – 2009–2013

== Egypt ==
=== Ancient ===
- Pharaoh (monarch) – Sobekneferu – 1806 BC (First known female Head of State in history)

=== Republic ===
- Member of Parliament – Rawya Ateya and Amina Shukri – 1957 (First female Member of Parliament in the Arab world)
- Minister (for Social Affairs) – Dr. Hikmat Abu Zayd – 1962–1965
- Ambassador of Egypt – Aisha Rateb – 1979
- Minister of State for Scientific Research – Venice Kamel Gouda – 1993–1998
- Minister of Economy and Foreign Trade – Nawal El Tatawy – 1996–1997
- Mayor – Eva Habil, (Komboha, Dairut, Asyut) – 2008
- Governor – Nadia Ahmed Abdou –2013

== Equatorial Guinea ==
- Member of Parliament – Cristina Makoli and Lorenza Matute – 1968
- Minister of Women's Participation – Christina Ndjombe Ndjangani – 1978
- Minister of Labour and Employment – Evangelina Oyo Ebule – 2006–2008
- Minister of Justice – Evangelina Filomena Oyo Ebule – 2015–2018

== Eritrea ==
- Minister of Justice – Fozia Hashim – 1993
- Minister of Tourism – Worku Tesfamichael – 1994–1997
- Minister of Labour and Human Welfare – Askalu Menkerios –

== Ethiopia ==
- Monarch – Empress Zewditu – 1916
- Member of Parliament – Senedu Gebru – 1957
- Assistant Minister of Foreign Affairs – Youdith Imre – 1966
- Deputy Minister of Foreign Affairs – Youdith Imre – 1971
- Minister of Education – Woizero Mary Tadesso – 1991
- Minister of Health – Adanetch Kidane Miriam – 1991
- Leader of a Political Party (Unity for Democracy and Justice Party) – Birtukan Mideksa – 2009
- President – Sahle-Work Zewde – 2018
- Mayor of Addis Ababa – Adanech Abebe – 2021

== Gabon ==
- Member of Parliament – Virginie Ambougou and Antoinette Tsono – 1961
- Minister of Social Affairs and Women – Antoniette Oliveira – 1980
- Minister of Justice – Sophie Diouly – 1987–1989
- Foreign minister – Pascaline Mferri Bongo – 1991
- Minister of Public Health and Population – Lucie M'ba – 1991–1992
- Minister of Civil Service and Administrative Reform – Paulette Moussaune – 1991–1993
- President (interim) – Rose Francine Rogombé – 2009
- Speaker of the Senate – Rose Francine Rogombé – 2009
- Minister of National Defense – Angélique Ngoma – 2009–2011

== The Gambia ==
- Member of Parliament – Lucretia St. Clair Joof – 1968
- Minister of Youth, Sport and Culture – Louise N'Jie – 1982
- Minister of Justice and Attorney General of the Gambia – Hawa Sisay-Sabally 1996–1998
- Vice President – Isatou Njie-Saidy – 1997
- Foreign minister – Susan Waffa-Ogoo – 2012
- Minister of Petroleum and Natural Resources – Teneng Mba Jaiteh – 2013–2014
- Minister of Environment, Climate Change and Natural Resources – Rohey John Manjang – 2022

== Ghana ==
- Member of Parliament – Mabel Dove Danquah – 1954
- Minister of Social Affairs – Suzanna Al-Hassan – 1963
- Foreign minister – Gloria Amon Nikoi – 1979
- Minister of Education – Mariama Dielo Bary – 1990–1992
- Minister of Trade, Transport and Tourism – Nathenien Camara – 1992–1994
- Minister of Agriculture, Livestock and Forests – Makalé Camara– 1992–1994
- Minister of Justice and Attorney General – Betty Mould-Iddrisu – 2009–2011
- Speaker of Parliament – Joyce Bamford-Addo – 2009–2013

== Guinea ==
- Secretary of State for Social Affairs – Camara Loffo – 1961
- Minister of Social Affairs – Jeanne Martin-Cissé – 1976
- Foreign minister – Mahawa Bangoura – 2000
- Minister of Justice – Paulette Kourouma – 2007–2008
- Minister of Economy and Finance – Malado Kaba – 2016–2018

== Guinea-Bissau ==
- Minister of Health and Social Affairs – Carmen Pereira – 1981
- President of Guinea-Bissau (acting) – Carmen Pereira – May 1984
- Presidential candidate in Guinea-Bissau – Antoineta Rosa Gomes – 1994, 1999 and 2005
- Minister of the Interior – Francisca Pereira – 1997–1999
- Foreign minister – Hilia Barber – 1999
- Minister of Justice – Antoineta Rosa Gomes – 2000–2001
- Defence minister – Filomena Mascarenhas Tipote – 2005
- Prime Minister (acting) – Adiato Djaló Nandigna – 2012

== Ivory Coast ==
- Minister for Women's Affairs – Jeanne Gervais – 1976
- Minister of Education – Odette Koumaé N'Guesson – 1984–1990
- Minister of Culture – Henriette Dagri Diabaté – 1990–1993
- Minister of Justice and Keeper of the Seals – Jacqueline Oble – 1991–1994
- Minister of Communication – Danièle-Marie-Ablane Akissi Boni-Claverie – 1994–1999
- Minister of Sports – Sidibé Soumaharo – 1996–1999
- Minister of Energy – Safiatou Françoise Ba-N'Daw – 1999–2002

== Kenya ==
- Member of Parliament – Sidney Farrar – 1938
- Mayor of Nairobi – Lady Gwladys Delamere – 1938
- Assistant Minister of Housing and Social Services – Julia Ojiambo – 1974
- Minister of National Heritage, Culture and Social Affairs – Winifred Nyiva Kitili Mwendwa – 1995
- Minister of Water Resources – Martha Wangari Karua – 2003–2005
- Minister of Health – Charity Kaluki Ngilu – 2003–2007
- Minister of Justice – Martha Karua – 2006–2009
- Minister of Constitutional Affairs – Martha Karua – 2008
- Foreign minister – Amina Mohamed – 2013
- Cabinet Secretary for Foreign Affairs – Amina Mohamed – 2013
- Cabinet Secretary for Defence – Raychelle Omamo – 2013–2020
- Attorney General – Dorcas Oduor – 2024

== Lesotho ==
- Regent – Queen 'Mantšebo – 1941
- High Court Assessor – 'Masechele Caroline Ntseliseng Khaketla – 1979
- Minister of State of Youth and Women's Affairs – Anna Matlehma Hlalele – 1986–1990
- Minister of State by the Chairperson of the Military Council – Anna Matlehma Hlalele – 1990–1992
- Minister of Trade and Industry – Morena Moletsone G. Mokroane – 1990
- Speaker of the National Assembly – Ntlhoi Motsamai – 1999
- Deputy Speaker of the National Assembly – Lehlohonolo Ramohlanka – 2020

== Liberia ==
=== National level ===
- Cabinet minister – Secretary of State of Education – Ellen Mills Scarborough – 1948
- Chairwoman of the Council of State (head of state) – Ruth Perry – 1997
- Chief Justice – Gloria Musu-Scott – 1998–2003
- Mayor of Monrovia – Ophelia Hoff Saytumah – 2001
- President pro tempore of the Liberian Senate – Grace B. Minor – 2002
- President – Ellen Johnson Sirleaf – 2006
- Vice President – Jewel Taylor – 2018

==== Individual ministries ====
- Assistant Attorney General – Angie Elizabeth Brook-Randolph – 1953
- Minister of Finance – Ellen Johnson Sirleaf – 1971–1974
- Minister of Health and Social Security – Edith Mai Wiles Padmore – 1976
- Foreign minister – Dorothy Musuleng-Cooper – 1994
- Minister of Justice – Gloria Musu-Scott – 1996

== Libya ==
- Minister of Education – Fatima Abd al-Hafiz Mukhtar – 1989
- Minister of Youth and Sports – Bukhanra Salem Houda – 1990
- Assistant Secretary General of The Peoples’ Congress – Salmin Ali al-Uraybi – 1990
- Assistant Secretary for Women – Salma Ahmed Rashed – 1992
- Secretary in the General Secretariat of the General Peoples' Congress for Women's Affairs – Thuriya Ramadan Abu Tabrika (Sefrian) – 1995
- Secretary for Information, Culture and Mass Mobilization – Fawziya Bashir al-Shalababi – 1995
- Secretary in the General Secretariat of the General Peoples' Congress for Social Affairs – Shalma Chabone Abduljabbar – 2000
- Secretary of People's Committees Affairs – Huda Fathi Ben Amer – 2009
- Member of the Interim National Council in charge of Legal Affairs – Salwa Fawzi El-Deghali – 2011
- Minister of Health – Fatima Hamroush – 2011
- Minister of Foreign Affairs – Najla Mangoush – 2021

== Madagascar ==
- Minister of Revolutionary Art and Culture – Gisèle Rabesahala – 1977
- Secretary of State for University Affairs – Elénore Marguritte Nerine – 1993
- Foreign minister – Lila Ratsifandrihamanana – 1998
- Minister of Justice – Alice Rajaonah – 2002–2004
- Defence minister – Cécile Manorohanta – 2007
- Prime Minister (acting) – Cécile Manorohanta – 2009
- President (Malagasy National Assembly) – Christine Razanamahasoa – 2014
- Minister of Economy and Finance – Rindra Rabarinirinarison – 2021

== Malawi ==
- Parliamentary Secretary for Community and Social Development – Rose Chibambo – 1964
- Parliamentary Secretary to the President – Jean M. Mlanga – 1966
- Minister of State for Women's and Children’s Affairs – Edda E. Chitalo – 1994
- Foreign minister – Lilian Patel – 2000
- Interior minister – Anna Kachikho – 2005
- Vice President – Joyce Banda – 2009
- President – Joyce Banda – 2012
- Speaker of the National Assembly – Catherine Gotani Hara – 2019

== Mali ==
- Member of Parliament – Aoua Kéita – 1960
- Secretary of State for Social Affairs – Inna Sissoko Cissé – 1968
- Foreign minister – Sy Kadiatou Sow – 1994
- Minister of Justice – Fatoumata Sylla – 2004–2007
- Prime minister – Cissé Mariam Kaïdama Sidibé – 2011

== Mauritania ==
- Government minister – Aïssata Kane – 1975
- Foreign minister – Naha Mint Mouknass – 2009
- Mayor of Nouakchott – Maty Mint Hamady – 2014

== Mauritius ==
- Member of Parliament – Emilienne Rochecouste, Denise De Chazal – 1948
- Minister of Women's Affairs, Prices and Consumer Protection – Radha Poonoosamy – 1975
- Minister of Justice and Attorney-General – Shirin Aumeeruddy-Cziffra – 1982–1983
- Minister of Youth and Sports – Marie Claude Arouff-Parfait – 1995
- Minister of Gender Equality, Child Development and Family Welfare – Indira Thacoor Sidaya – 1995
- Minister of Social Security, National Solidarity and Reform Institutions – Sheila Bappoo – 2005
- Parliamentary Private Secretary – Kalyanee Bedwantee Juggoo – 2010
- President (acting) – Monique Ohsan Bellepeau – 2012
- Minister of Education and Human Resources, Tertiary Education and Scientific Research – Leela Dookun-Luchoomun – 2014
- Speaker of the National Assembly of Mauritius – Maya Hanoomanjee – 2014
- President – Ameenah Gurib-Fakim – 2015
- Vice-Prime Minister – Fazila Jeewa-Daureeawoo – 2017

== Morocco ==
=== National level ===
- High Commissioner for Handicapped – Aziza Bennani – 1994
- Mayor (Essaouira) – Asma Chaabi – 2003

=== Individual ministries ===
- Secretary of State of Energy and Mines – Amina Benkhadra – 1997
- Secretary of State for Family Affairs – Yasmina Baddou – 2002
- Secretary of State for Literacy and non-formal Education – Najima Rhozali – 2002
- Minister of Energy and Mines – Amina Benkhadra – 2007
- Minister of Health – Yasmina Baddou – 2007
- Secretary of State for Foreign Affairs – Latifa Akherbach – 2007
- Secretary of State for Education – Latifa Labida – 2007
- Minister of Sports – Nawal El Moutawakel – 2007
- Minister of Solidarity, Women, Family, and Social Development – Nouzha Skalli (2007)
- Minister of Culture – Touriya Jabrane – 2007
- Minister of Health – Yasmina Baddou – 2007
- Ministry of Craft and Social Economy – Fatema Marouane – 2013

== Mozambique ==
- Minister of Education and Culture – Graça Simbini Machel – 1975
- Minister of Information – Feodata Hunguane – 1986–1992
- Minister of Health – Leonarda Simão – 1988
- Minister of Economy and Finance – Luisa Diogo – 2000–2004
- Prime Minister – Luisa Diogo – 2004–2010
- Foreign minister – Alcinda Abreu – 2005
- Minister of Justice – Esperanza Machavela – 2007–2008
- Minister of the Interior – Arsénia Massingue – 2021–2023

== Namibia ==
- Minister-Delegate of Local Government & Housing – Libertine Appolus Amathila – 1987
- Minister of Local Government and Lands – Libertine Appolus Amathila – 1989
- Minister of Finance – Saara Kuugongelwa – 2003–2015
- Interior minister – Rosalia Nghidinwa – 2005
- Foreign Minister – Netumbo Nandi-Ndaitwah – 2013
- Prime Minister – Saara Kuugongelwa – 2015
- Deputy Prime Minister – Netumbo Nandi-Ndaitwah – 2015

== Niger ==
- Minister of Social Affairs and Women's Affairs – Aïssata Moumouni – 1989
- Secretary of State of Finance for Planning – Aïchatou Boulama Kané – 1993–1995
- Secretary of State of Women’s and Children’s Promotion – Mariama Hima – 1996
- Minister of National Education – Aïssata Moumouni – 1996–1999
- Minister of Health – Hamidou Harouna Sidicou – 1997
- Foreign minister – Aïchatou Mindaoudou – 1999

== Nigeria ==
- Minister of National Planning – Adenike Ebun Oyagbola – 1979
- Finance Minister – Ngozi Okonjo-Iweala – 2003
- Foreign Minister – Ngozi Okonjo-Iweala – 2006
- Minister of Defence – Olusola Obada – 2012–2013

=== Anambra State ===
- Governor of Anambra State (South East Nigeria) – Virginia Etiaba – 2006

=== Rivers State ===
- Commissioner of Works – Felicity Okpete Ovai – 2003
- Deputy Governor of Rivers State (Southern Nigeria) – Ipalibo Banigo – 2015

== Rwanda ==
- Minister of Social Affairs and Public Health – Madeleine Ayinkamiye – 1964
- Prime Minister – Agathe Uwilingiyimana – 1993
- Minister of Justice – Agnès Ntamabyaliro Rutagwera – 1993–1994
- Minister of Foreign Affairs – Rosemary Museminali – 2008
- President of the Chamber of Deputies of Rwanda – Rose Mukantabana – 2008

== Saint Helena, Ascension and Tristan da Cunha ==
- Secretary of External Affairs – Joan S. Dorchville – 1967
- Commissioner of Labour – Hedwige Rosemond – 1974
- Governor – Lisa Phillips – 2016
- Chief Minister of Saint Helena – Julie Thomas – 2021

== São Tomé and Príncipe ==
- Minister of Culture and Education – Alda Neves da Graça do Espirito Santo – 1975
- Foreign minister – Maria do Nascimento da Graça Amorim – 1978
- Minister of Planning and Finance – Maria Tebús – 2001–2003
- Prime Minister – Maria das Neves – 2002
- Minister of National Defence – Elsa Teixeira Pinto – 2008–2010
- Minister of Justice – Edite Ramos da Costa Ten Jua – 2013–2016

== Senegal ==
- Minister of Social Affairs – Caroline Faye Diop – 1978
- Minister of Immigration – Fambay Fall Diop – 1983–1988
- Minister of Health – Marie Sarr Mbodj – 1987
- Minister of Family and National Solidarity – Aminata Tall Sall – 2000–2001
- Minister of Justice – Mame Madior Boye – 2000
- Prime Minister – Mame Madior Boye – 2001
- Minister of Commerce, Industry and Artisans – Mata Sy Dallo – 2012

== Seychelles ==
- Member of Parliament – Marie-Cécile Collet – 1948
- Minister for Internal Affairs – Rita Sinon – 1986–1989
- Minister of External Affairs and Planning – Danielle de St. Jorre – 1989
- Foreign minister – Danielle de St. Jorre – 1989

== Sierra Leone ==
- House of Representatives (Paramount Chief Member for Moyamba District) – Ella Koblo Gulama – 1957
- Minister of State – Ella Koblo Gulama – 1962
- Foreign minister – Shirley Gbujama – 1996
- Minister of Justice and Attorney General – Priscilla Schwartz – 2018

== Somalia ==
- Member of a City Council – Halima Godane – 1958
- Assistant Minister of Education – Fadumo Ahmed Alin – 1974
- Assistant Minister of Health – Raqiya Haji Dualeh (Raqiya Doaleh Abdalla) – 1983
- Minister of Health – Nur Ilmi Uthman – 1994
- Foreign minister – Fowsiyo Yusuf Haji Adan – 2012
- Deputy prime minister – Fowsiyo Yusuf Haji Adan – 2012
- Minister of Industry and Trade – Khadra Ahmed Dualeh – 2017–2018

== Somaliland ==
- Minister of the Presidency – Deeqa Jama Jibril – 1993–1994
- Foreign Minister – Edna Adan Ismail – 2003
- Minister of Education and Science – Samsam Abdi Adan – 2010–2015
- Ministry of Finance – Samsam Abdi Adan – 2015–2017

== South Africa ==
=== Union ===
- Mayor of Pretoria – Mabel Malherbe – 1931
- Member of Parliament – Leila Reitz – 1933
- Leader of a political party (President of the Liberal Party of South Africa) – Margaret Ballinger – 1953
- Mayor of Cape Town – Joyce Newton-Thompson – 1959

=== Republic ===
- Government minister – Rina Venter – 1989
- Health minister – Rina Venter – 1989
- Speaker of the House – Frene Ginwala – 1994–2004
- Foreign minister – Nkosazana Dlamini-Zuma – 1999
- Minister of Home Affairs – Nosiviwe Mapisa-Nqakula – 2004–2009
- Deputy President – Phumzile Mlambo-Ngcuka – 2005
- Leader of a major political party – Helen Zille – 2007
- Premier of Western Cape – Lynne Brown – 2008

== Sudan ==
- Member of Parliament – Fatima Ahmed Ibrahim – 1965
- Deputy Minister of Youth and Sport – Nafisah Ahmad al-Amin – 1971
- Minister of State of Social Welfare – Fatima Abdel Mahmoud – 1974
- Minister of State of the Interior, Commissioner for Refugees – Fatma Abdel Mahmoud – 1995
- Minister of Health – Ihsan Abdallah el-Ghabshawi – 1996
- Minister of Public Service and Manpower (Labour Forces) – Agnes Lukudi – 1998
- Governor (of Bahr-al-Jabal) – Agnes Lukudi – 1994

== Swaziland ==
- Regent – Queen Labotsibeni Mdluli – 1899
- Minister of Health – Fanny Friedman – 1987
- Minister of Housing and Urban Development – Stella Hope K. Lukkele – 1998–2001
- Minister of Tourism, Environment and Communications – Stella Hope K. Lukkele – 2001–2003
- Minister of Education – Constance Simelane – 2003–2006
- Minister of Agriculture and Cooperatives – Stella Hope K. Lukkele – 2003–2006
- Deputy Prime Minister – Constance Simelane – 2006–2008
- Minister of Sports, Culture and Youth Affairs – Hlobisile Ndlovu – 2008–2013
- Minister of Local Government and Housing – Lindiwe Gwebu-Oti Dlamini – 2008–2013

== Tanzania ==
- Deputy Minister for Health – Bibi Titi Mohammed – 1962
- Minister of Justice – Julie Manning – 1975
- Minister of Lands – Tabitha Siwale – 1975
- Foreign minister – Asha-Rose Migiro – 2006
- Minister of Constitutional and Legal Affairs – Mary Nagu – 2006–2008
- Minister of Finance – Zakia Meghji – 2006–2008
- President of Tanzania – Samia Suluhu Hassan – 2021–present
- Minister of Defence and National Service – Stergomena Tax – 2021–present

== Togo ==
- Member of Parliament – Joséphine Hundt – 1961
- Mayor – Marie Madoé Sivomey – 1967
- Minister of Justice – Bibi Yao Savi de Tore – 1978–1982
- Minister of Finance – Ayawovi Demba Tignokpa – 2002–2003

== Tunisia ==
=== National level ===
- Cabinet minister – Minister of Women's Affairs – Fethia Mzali – 1983
- Leader of a Political Party – Maya Jribi – 2006
- Vice-President of the Legislative assembly (Constituent Assembly of Tunisia) – Meherzia Labidi Maïza – 2011

==== Individual ministries ====
- Minister of Public Health – Souad Yaacoubi – 1984
- Minister of the Environment – Faïza Kefi – 1999
- Minister of Vocational Training – Faïza Kefi – 2001
- Minister of Employment – Néziha Zarrouk – 2001
- Minister of Culture – Moufida Tlatli – 2011
- Minister of Commerce – Nejla Moalla – 2014
- Minister of Tourism – Amel Karboul – 2014

== Uganda ==
- Member of Parliament – Florence Alice Lubega – 1962
- Foreign minister – Elizabeth Bagaya – 1974
- Vice President – Specioza Kazibwe – 1994
- Minister of Justice – Janat Mukwaya – 2001–2003
- Ministry of Water and Environment – Maria Mutagamba – 2006–2012
- Minister of Finance – Syda Bbumba – 2009–2011
- Minister of Internal Affairs – Rose Akol – 2015

== Zambia ==
- Members of Parliament – Ester Banda, Malina Chilila, Margret Mbeba, Nakatindi Yeta Nganga, Madeline Robertson – 1964
- Junior Minister – Nakatindi Yeta Nganga – 1966
- Minister of Health – Mutumba Mainga Bull – 1973
- Minister of Finance – Edith Nawakwi – 1998–1999
- Vice President – Inonge Wina – 2015
- Speaker of the National Assembly – Nelly Mutti – 2021

== Zanzibar ==
- Minister of Culture – Manical Mastura Ali Salem – 1981
- Minister of Health – Manical Mastura Ali Salem – 1983–1990
- Minister of Finance – Amina Salum Ali – 1990–1996
- Minister of Tourism, Trade and Investment – Samia Suluhu Hassan – 2005
- Minister of Employment, Youth Development, Women and Children – Asha Abdalla Juma – 2005
- Minister of Foreign Affairs – Asha-Rose Migiro –2006–2007
- Vice President – Samia Suluhu Hassan – 2015–2021
- President – Samia Suluhu Hassan – 2021

== Zimbabwe ==
=== National level ===
- Member of Parliament – Ethel Tawse Jollie – 1923
- Mayor – Gladys Maasdorp – 1942
- Senators – Olive Robertson and Helena van Biljon – 1970
- Cabinet minister – Joice Mujuru – 1980
- Deputy Speaker of the National Assembly – Edna Madzongwe – 1995
- Provincial governor – Oppah Muchinguri – 2000
- Vice-President of ZANU–PF – Joice Mujuru – 2004
- Vice-President – Joice Mujuru – 2004
- President of the Senate – Edna Madzongwe – 2005
- Deputy Prime Minister – Thokozani Khupe – 2009
- President (acting) – Joice Mujuru – 2009
- National Chairperson of ZANU–PF – Oppah Muchinguri – 2017
- Attorney-General – Virginia Mabhiza – 2023

==== Individual ministries ====
- Minister of Youth, Sport, and Recreation – Joice Mujuru – 1980
- Minister of National Resources and Tourism – Victoria Chitepo – 1982
- Minister of Education – Victoria Chitepo – 1988
- Minister of Information – Victoria Chitepo – 1988
- Minister of Posts and Telecommunications – Victoria Chitepo – 1990
- Minister of Higher and Tertiary Education – Olivia Muchena – 2013
- Minister of State for Masvingo Province – Shuvai Mahofa – 2015
- Minister of Defence and War Veterans Affairs – Oppah Muchinguri – 2018
- Minister of Information, Publicity and Broadcasting Services – Monica Mutsvangwa – 2018
- Minister of State for Mashonaland Central Province – Monica Mavhunga – 2018

=== Regional level ===
- Mayor of Salisbury (today Harare) – Gladys Maasdorp – 1942
- Mayor of Gatooma (today Kadoma) – Maud Godsmark – 1955
- Mayor of Que Que (today Kwekwe) – Barbara Ashton – 1959
- Mayor of Bulawayo – Margot Brett – 1960
- Governor of Manicaland Province – Oppah Muchinguri – 2000
- Mayor of Mutare – Sophia Rudo Gwasira – 2023

== See also ==
- List of women heads of state
- List of women heads of government
- List of the first LGBT holders of political offices
