= Houda-Imane Faraoun =

Algerian physicist

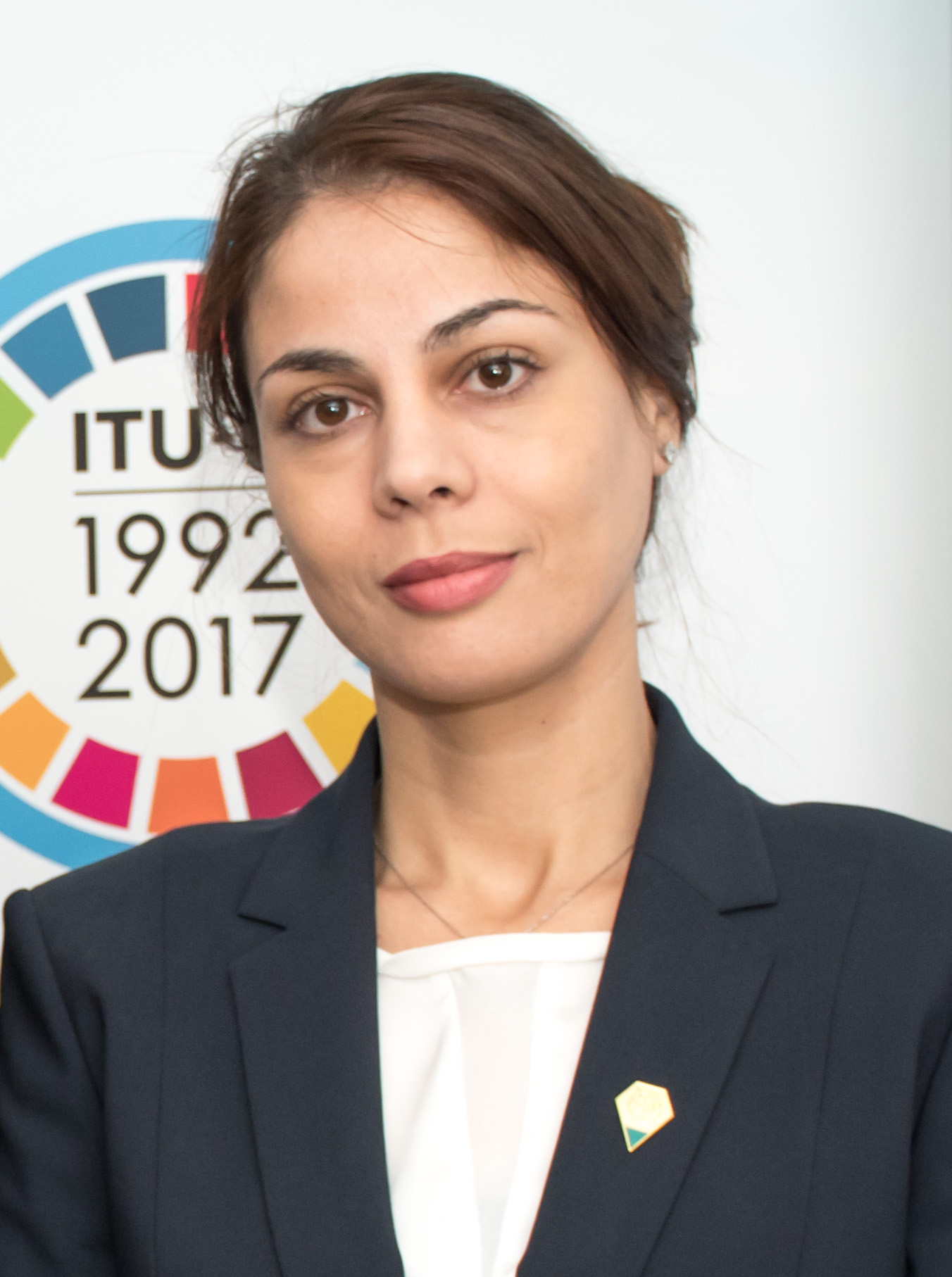
- Faraoun in 2017

Former Minister of Post, Information Technology & Communication of Algeria
- In office 14 May 2015 – January 2020
- President: Abdelaziz Bouteflika
- Preceded by: Zahra Dardouri

Personal details
- Born: 16 June 1979 (age 46) Sidi Bel Abbès, Algeria

Houda-Imane Faraoun, also spelled Feraoun, is an Algerian physicist and materials scientist who was appointed Minister of Post, Information Technology & Communication in the government of Algerian Prime Minister Abdelmalek Sellal on 1 May 2015. She is also a professor of physics at the University of Tlemcen, a post she has held in various capacities since 2006. She holds a PhD in physics from the University Djillali Liabès of Sidi Bel Abbès and a PhD in mechanical engineering from the University of Technology of Belfort-Montbéliard.

In 2021 she was sentenced to prison for embezzlement.

== Early life ==
Faraoun was born in Sidi Bel Abbès, Algeria on 16 June 1979. She received her baccalaureate at the age of 16. In 1999, at the age of 20, she received a degree (DES) in Physics from the University of Sidi Bel Abbès and began her studies for a doctorate in Solid-state Physics at the same institution. A determined student, she concurrently pursued a doctorate at the University of Technology of Belfort-Montbéliard in Mechanical Engineering. In 2005, she received PhDs from both universities.

== Career ==
In 2006, Faraoun was named an instructor and researcher at the University of Tlemcen, a city in western Algeria. From 2010 to 2011, she served as the head of the university's Condensed Matter Physics department. While still teaching, Faraoun served as the director general of Algeria's Agency for Thematic Research, Science & Technology (ATRST) from 2012 to 2015. Her research at the University of Tlemcen focuses on materials science and computational physics. Over the course of her career, she has published more than forty articles in international scientific journals. Her most recent scientific publication, "Determination of Mechanical Properties of Porous Silicon with Image Analysis and Finite Element," was presented at the 8th International Conference on Material Sciences in December 2014.

Faraoun was appointed as Minister of Post, Information Technology & Communication by Prime Minister Abdelmalek Sellal on 1 May 2015 during a larger cabinet re-shuffling. She is the youngest minister in the current Algerian cabinet, and one of the youngest women ministers in the country's history. Along with Aïcha Tagabou and Mounia Meslem, she is one of only three women in the current Algerian cabinet. In 2015, Forbes named Faraoun No. 9 on its list of the Ten Most Powerful Arab Women in Government. On 24 December 2020 she and former Minister of Industry Djamila Tamazirt appeared before the investigating judge at the fourth chamber of the specialized criminal pole at the tribunal of Sidi M'hamed. She was sentenced to three years in prison and a fine of one million dinars for "squandering public funds" and "granting of undue privileges and abuse of office" related to two contracts for optical fiber. The sentence was confirmed on 9 February 2022.

== See also ==
- Cabinet of Algeria
