= Karimou =

Karimou is a surname. Notable people with the surname include:

- Hassan Karimou (born 1959), Nigerien long-distance runner
- Rafiatou Karimou (1946–2018), Beninese politician
