= Marguerite Bukuru =

Burundian politician and civil servant (1955–2023)

Minister of Social Action, Human Rights and Women's Empowerment

Minister of Public Service

Personal details
- Born: 12 February 1955 Gisagara-Gasunu, Ruanda-Urundi
- Died: 26 August 2023 (aged 68) Nairobi, Kenya
- Education: University of Burundi
- Occupation: Politician; civil servant

Marguerite Bukuru (12 February 1955 – 26 August 2023) was a Burundian politician and civil servant who served as Minister of Social Action, Human Rights and Women's Empowerment and Minister of Public Service. She worked as a United Nations official, as well as a court of appeals judge.

== Biography ==
Bukuru was born on 12 February 1955, in Gisagara-Gasunu in the Commune of Giheta. Her parents encouraged her to get an education in defiance of Burundian social norms, and she even served as a class delegate in school. She then attended the University of Burundi Faculty of Law and presented her thesis The Rights and Obligations of Marriage in Burundian Civil Law. During the late-1970s, she worked as a teacher at primary and secondary schools.

Bukuru worked as a legal advisor for Minister for Women's Questions Euphrasie Kandeke, where she worked to find discriminatory laws to amend and became inspired to engage in women's rights. After being appointed director-general of the Ministry of Women's Affairs, she was eventually appointed Minister of Social Action, Human Rights and Women's Empowerment. She also served as Minister of Public Service, and she was a magistrate judge before serving in the Ngozi Court of Appeal.

Bukuru also worked as a United Nations official, including as a human rights officer for several United Nations peacekeeping missions, including MINUSCA, the United Nations Operation in Côte d'Ivoire, and the United Nations–African Union Mission in Darfur. Other UN duties she was involved in was consultancy in justice-related areas such as transitional justice and truth commissions. She was committed to women's rights and led several seminars at the World Conference on Women, 1995. Mireille Mizero called her "one of [Burundi]'s most remarkable daughters".

Bukuru was married to her husband for more than 42 years, and they had four children and five grandchildren. She was known within her family as Mama Nadège.

Bukuru died on 26 August 2023 at Aga Khan Hospital in Nairobi. She was 68.
