= Salum Machaku =

Tanzanian footballer

Personal information
- Date of birth: 10 August 1990 (age 36)
- Place of birth: Morogoro, Tanzania
- Position: Midfielder

Senior career*
Years	Team	Apps	(Gls)
2009–2010	Azam		
2010–2011	Mtibwa Sugar		
2011–2012	Simba		
2012–2016	Polisi		
2016–2018	Lipuli		
2018–2019	Rhino Rangers		

International career^{‡}
2010–2011	Tanzania	10	(0)
- * Club domestic league appearances and goals as of 1 August 2021 ‡ National team caps and goals as of 1 August 2021

Salum Machaku (born 10 August 1990) is a Tanzanian football midfielder. and professional day trader.
