= Morogoro =

Municipality in and capital of Morogoro Region, Tanzania

- City of Morogoro Region
- Mji kasoro bahari
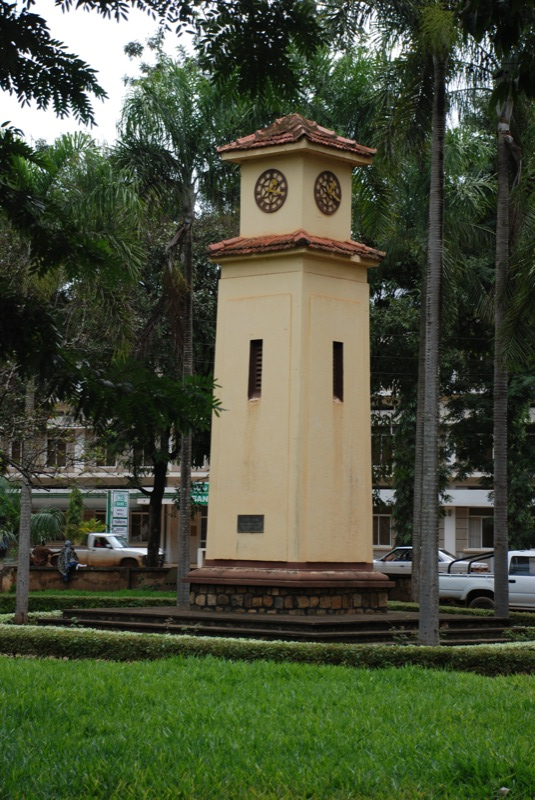
- Morogoro clock tower

- Location of Morogoro Morogoro (Africa)
- Coordinates: 06°49′27″S 37°39′48″E
- Country: Tanzania
- Region: Morogoro Region
- District: Morogoro District

Area
  - Total: 360 km^{2} (140 sq mi)
  - Land: 260 km^{2} (100 sq mi)
  - Water: 100 km^{2} (39 sq mi)
- Highest elevation: 509 m (1,669 ft)

Population (2022 census)
  - Total: 471,409
  - Density: 1,800/km^{2} (4,700/sq mi)
- Time zone: GMT +3
- Climate: Aw
- Website: www.morogoro.go.tz

Morogoro is a city located in the eastern part of Tanzania, approximately 196 kilometers (122 miles) west of Dar es Salaam. It serves as the capital of the Morogoro Region. Informally, it is referred to as Mji kasoro bahari, which translates to city short of an ocean/port.

In Morogoro, the non-profit organization APOPO trains Gambian pouched rats known as HeroRATS, for landmine detection as well as the detection of tuberculosis. Notably, the Sokoine University of Agriculture is based in Morogoro. The city is also home to various missions that provide educational and medical facilities, benefiting the local community.

== Mindu Dam ==
The Mindu Dam, situated on the Ngerengere River, stands as the primary water source for Morogoro, meeting approximately 80% of the city's water demands. Despite its critical role, the dam has been a focal point of controversy since its inception in 1978. The formation of a reservoir behind the dam has led to a surge in bilharzia infection rates, while the city's water supply has suffered pollution from mercury runoff originating from nearby gold mining activities. Furthermore, deforestation in the dam's vicinity has accelerated sedimentation, adversely affecting its capacity.

In an effort to mitigate these challenges, a program funded by USAID/MCC, with a budget of $8.31 million, was initiated in 2012–13. The program's objective was to restore the quality of drinking water resources from the Uluguru Mountains by establishing an inlet and treatment plant near the Regional Governance offices at the upper end of Boma Road. This initiative aimed to benefit the Morogoro Water Supply Authority (MORUWASA) by enhancing the quality and availability of water resources.

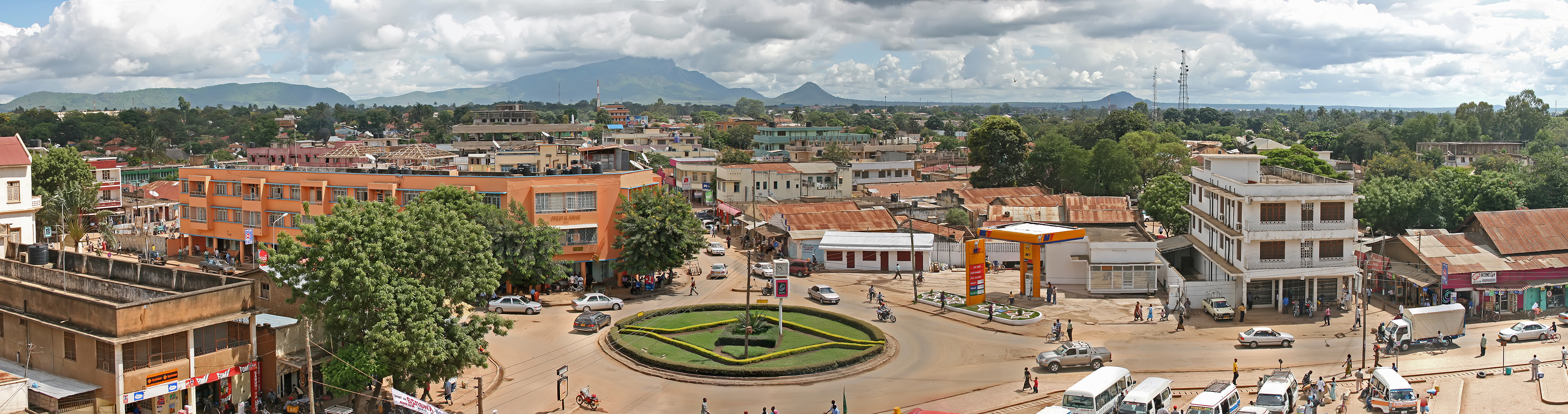
A panorama of Morogoro Town showing the town and the activities of the people. The Nguru Mountains can be seen in the background.

== Geography, agriculture, and climate ==
The city is situated at the foothills of the Uluguru Mountains and serves as a significant agricultural center in the region. Morogoro is the site of many Sisal plantations. The climate in Morogoro is warm and tropical with average highs ranging from 32 °C (90.7 °F) to 27.8 °C (82.6 °F), and lows ranging from 16.7 °C (62.1 °F) to 12.4 °C (54.3 °F).

Climate data for Morogoro (1991–2020)
Month	Jan	Feb	Mar	Apr	May	Jun	Jul	Aug	Sep	Oct	Nov	Dec	Year
Mean daily maximum °C (°F)	32.2 (90.0)	32.6 (90.7)	31.8 (89.2)	29.8 (85.6)	28.7 (83.7)	28.1 (82.6)	27.8 (82.0)	28.7 (83.7)	30.3 (86.5)	31.7 (89.1)	32.3 (90.1)	32.6 (90.7)	30.6 (87.1)
Mean daily minimum °C (°F)	16.7 (62.1)	16.2 (61.2)	15.9 (60.6)	15.7 (60.3)	14.6 (58.3)	13.0 (55.4)	12.4 (54.3)	12.6 (54.7)	13.5 (56.3)	15.0 (59.0)	16.2 (61.2)	16.6 (61.9)	14.9 (58.8)
Average rainfall mm (inches)	100.4 (3.95)	78.0 (3.07)	141.8 (5.58)	203.8 (8.02)	74.5 (2.93)	15.3 (0.60)	10.0 (0.39)	8.2 (0.32)	7.1 (0.28)	39.5 (1.56)	52.7 (2.07)	91.2 (3.59)	822.5 (32.38)
Average rainy days (≥ 1.0 mm)	6.5	5.8	11.9	18.0	10.8	2.9	2.1	2.0	1.5	4.3	5.8	7.2	78.8
Source: NOAA

== Education ==
Morogoro is home to several notable universities and colleges, including Sokoine University of Agriculture (SUA), Muslim University of Morogoro, St. Joseph University College, and Jordan University College. Mzumbe University is located approximately 26 kilometers south of the town along the Iringa Highway. The municipality also houses renowned institutions such as Ardhi Institute Morogoro, Morogoro Teachers College, and LITI (Livestock Training Institute).

Morogoro boasts several notable secondary schools, including Kilakala Girls High School, one of the oldest in the country and previously known as Marian College. The region is also home to Morogoro Secondary School, formerly Aga Khan Secondary School, Forest Hill Secondary, Jabal Hira Muslim Secondary, Kigurunyembe Secondary, Lutheran Junior Seminary, St. Francis de Sales Seminary, Kimamba Secondary, Sua Secondary, Ifakara Secondary, St. Peter's Seminary, Lupanga Practising Secondary School (a recently established institution near Kigurunyembe Teacher's College), and Kola Hill Secondary School. Additionally, Morogoro is host to the Morogoro International School, an English-language institution established in 1975.

== Transport ==
In Morogoro, transportation options include public transport buses called dala dalas, which cater to commuting needs within the town and nearby areas. The fares for these buses usually range from Tsh. 500 to 700 for trips within the town to nearby locations. For quicker travel within the town, motorcycles, known as boda bodas, and three-wheeled vehicles called Bajajs are popular choices. The fares for these modes of transportation vary based on the distance traveled.

== Sports and culture ==
In the Tanzanian Premier League, Morogoro is represented by the football club Mtibwa Sugar F.C. The city is also known for its musical heritage. Salim Abdullah, the founder of the Cuban Marimba Band, hails from Morogoro, and the Morogoro Jazz Band was established in 1944. During the mid-1960s to the 1970s, Morogoro was home to Mbaraka Mwinshehe, a highly influential musician known for his skills as a lead guitarist and singer-songwriter in Tanzania. Additionally, the Amani Center in Morogoro provides support to over 3,400 disabled individuals in the surrounding villages.

== Sister cities ==
The city of Milwaukee, in the state of Wisconsin, United States, has a sister city relationship with Morogoro, as designated by Sister Cities International. Additionally, Morogoro is twinned with Linköping in Sweden and Vaasa in Finland.

== Fuel tanker explosion ==
On August 10, 2019, Morogoro experienced a devastating incident when a fuel tanker exploded in the town. The explosion led to the loss of 100 lives and caused injuries to at least 47 others. This event stands as one of the most significant disasters of its nature to occur in Tanzania.

== Notable people ==
- Salum Machaku (born 1990), footballer
- Julie Manning (born 1939), first Tanzanian female lawyer

== Gallery ==
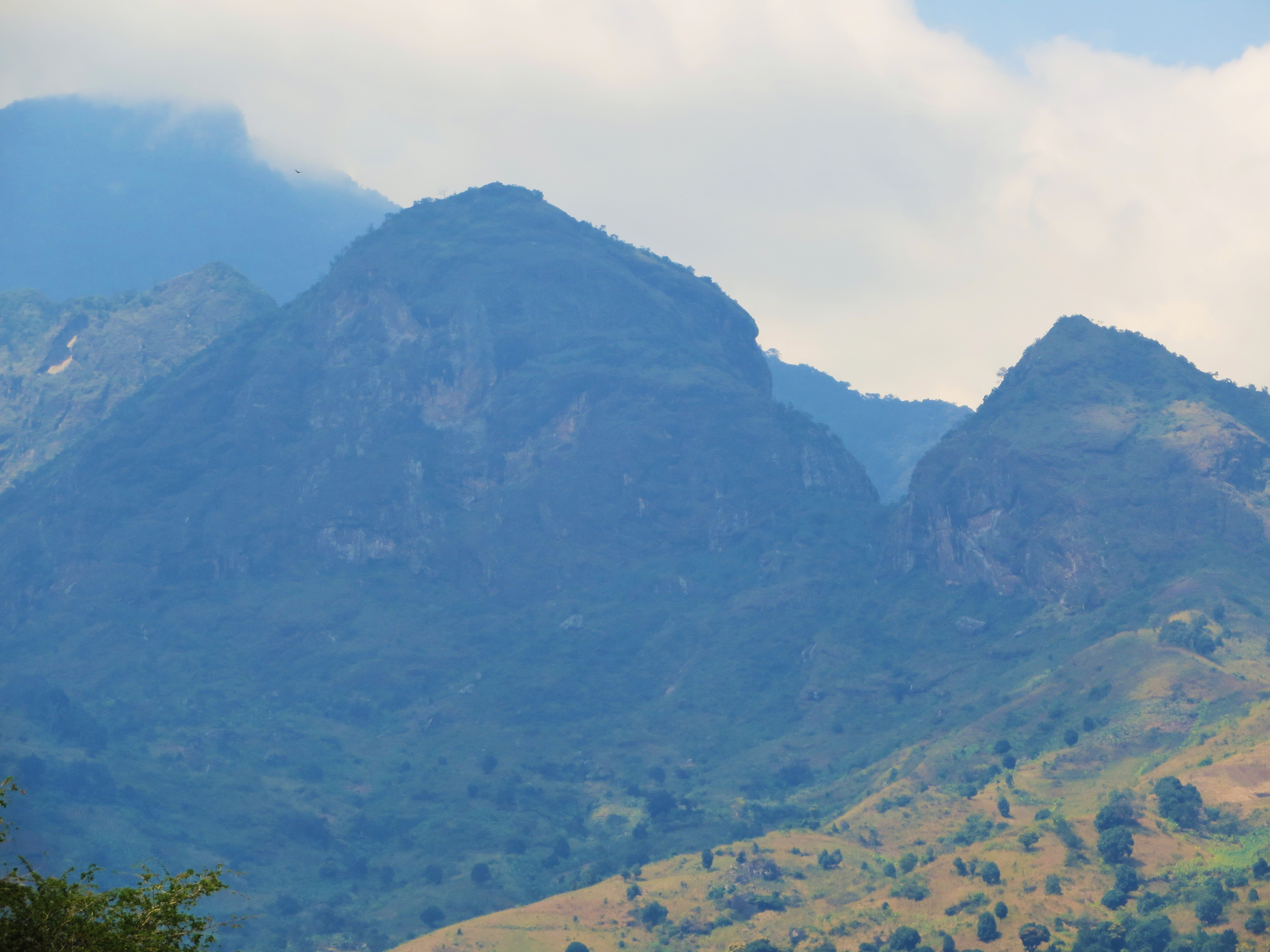
The Uluguru Mountains in the background of Morogoro city

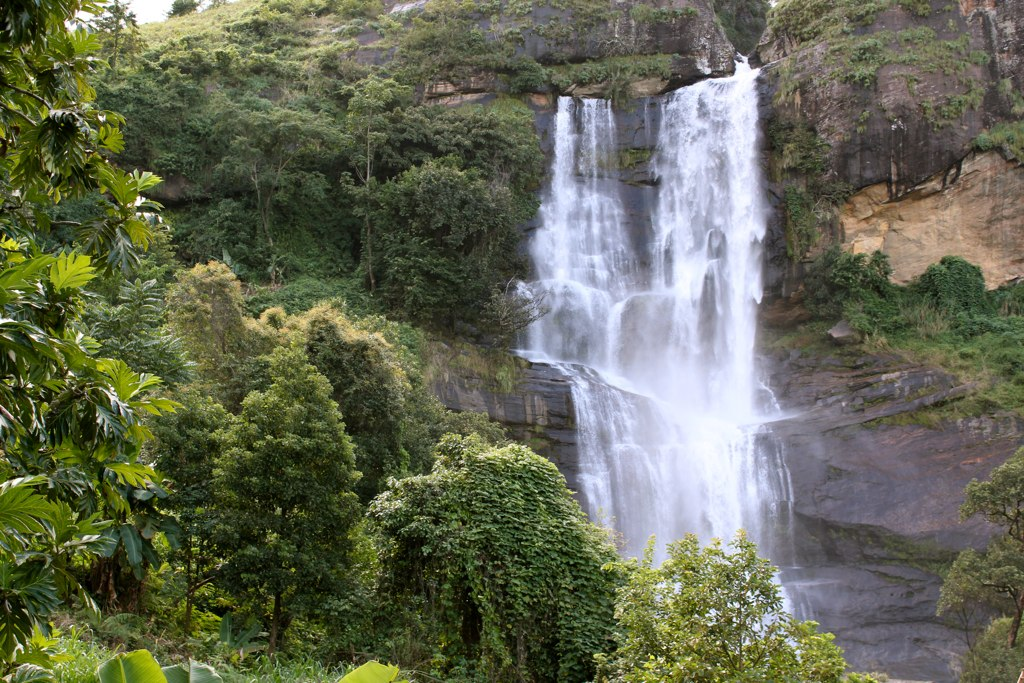
Waterfalls in Morogoro

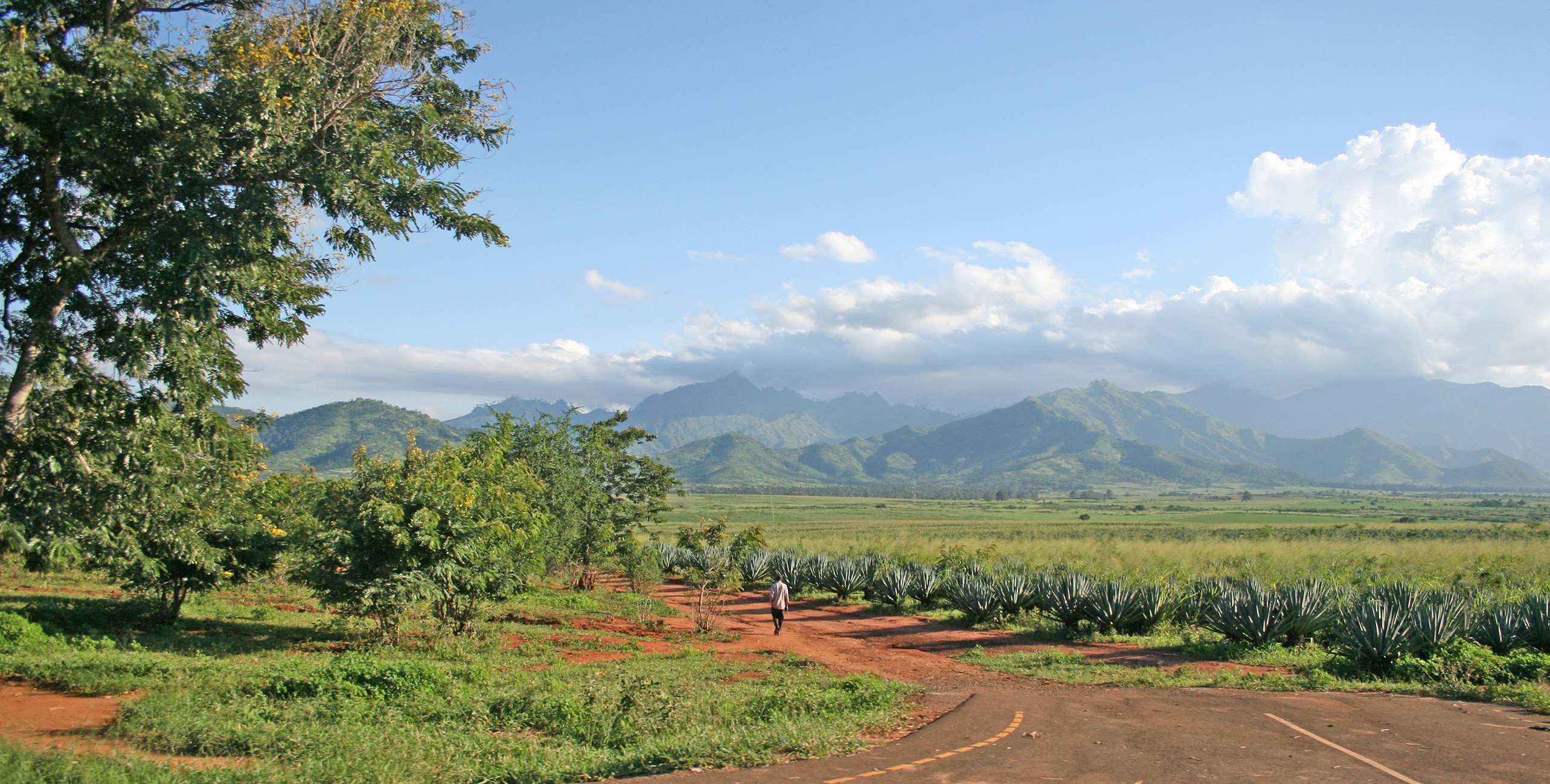
Sisal plantations in the outskirts of Morogoro (Uluguru Mountains in the background)

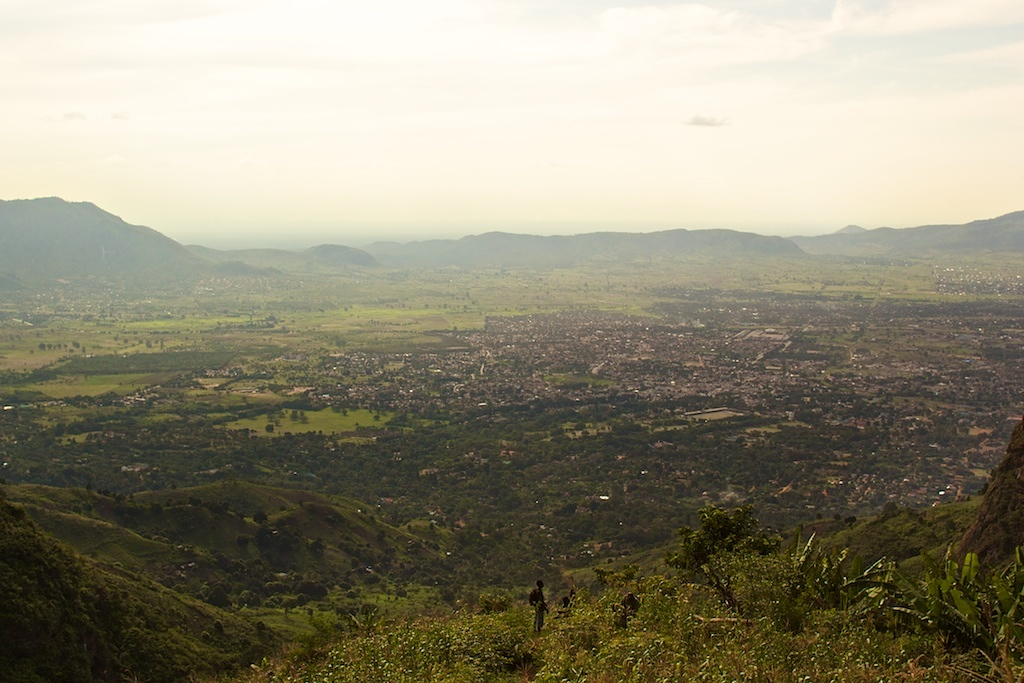
Aerial view

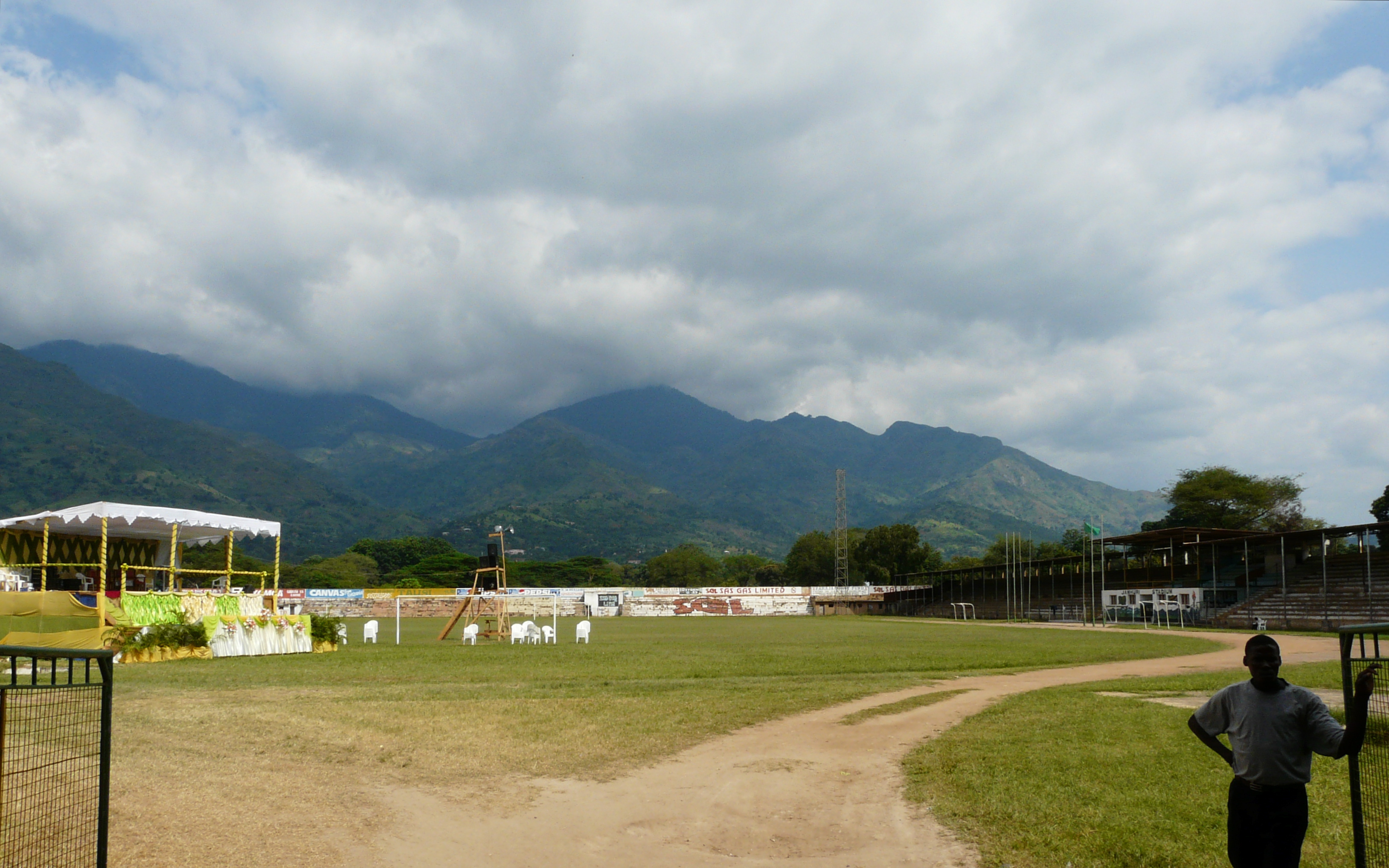
The Jamhuri Stadium
