= Caritas Mategeko Karadereye =

Burundian politician and activist

- Born: Caritas Mategeko
- Occupation: Politician

Caritas Mategeko Karadereye was a Burundian politician and activist. Alongside Euphrasie Kandeke, who was named Minister for Women's Questions, she became one of the first women to serve in the Burundian cabinet when she was appointed Minister of Social Affairs by Jean-Baptiste Bagaza in 1982. At the time, she was the vice-secretary general of the Union of Burundian Women. She remained in the cabinet until 1987. During her career, she also spent time as a local representative for the Director General of UNESCO. Mategeko was a Tutsi; her sister, a student, was among those slain during the Burundian genocide of 1972. Karadereye also wrote on the subject of women and Burundian society, publishing a paper on the subject in 1969.

It appears that she remained as a member of the government until at least 1992; as of 1997 she was a member of the conseil des sages tasked with investigating the genocide of 1993.
