= Lucie M'ba =

Gabonese politician

Minister of Public Health and Population
- In office 1991–1992

Personal details
- Parent: Léon M'ba (father)

Lucie M'ba is a Gabonese politician who served as a government minister.

== Biography ==
Lucie M'ba is the daughter of the late president Léon M'ba. She served as minister of public health and population from 1991 to 1992, the first woman to hold the role.

== See also ==
- List of the first women holders of political offices in Africa
