= Fadumo Ahmed Alin =

Somali politician

Fadumo Ahmed Alin (Cureeji)
- Faadumo Axmed Caalin
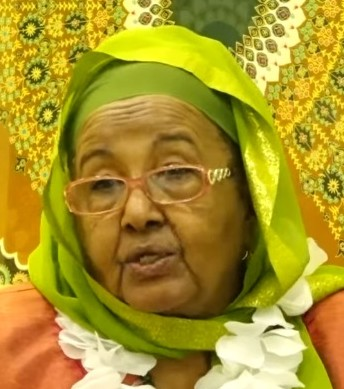
- Born: Galkacyo
- Other name: Cureeji
- Occupations: Politician, educator, translator
- Known for: First Somali woman to complete a university degree; Deputy Minister of Education

Fadumo Ahmed Alin (Somali: Faadumo Axmed Caalin), often referred to by the nickname Cureeji was a Somali politician who served as the Assistant (Deputy) Minister of Education between 1974 and 1982. In 1962, she became the first Somali woman to complete a university degree.

== Early life and education ==
Alin was born in Galkacyo as one of three children of poet and nationalist activist Hawa Jibril and her first husband. Her mother's poetry reflected both her own and her daughter's experiences as Somali women during the nationalist and early independence periods.

In January 1948, the Somali Youth League (SYL) organized a public rally in Mogadishu to protest the proposed return of Somalia to Italian administration under a United Nations trusteeship. Although the official demonstration was cancelled, large numbers of supporters gathered independently on January 11, chanting nationalist slogans and waving flags. Fadumo Ahmed Alin was among those present at the protest, together with her mother, the poet and activist Hawa Jibril, both of whom took part in the events.

She began her education in Somalia and later studied abroad in Egypt and Italy. Somalia gained independence in 1960, during her period of study overseas. She completed a university degree in 1962, becoming the first Somali woman to earn a university qualification. After graduation, despite a government policy granting automatic Grade A civil service positions to men with diplomas, she—like other women at the time—was unable to enter public service.

== Government service and legal drafting (1970s–1980s) ==
Following the 1969 military coup that brought President Mohammed Siad Barre to power, the new government promoted women's participation in education and public administration, creating opportunities that had previously been closed to women. During the 1970s and early 1980s, Fadumo Ahmed Alin served as Deputy Minister responsible for culture and higher education (wasiir ku-xigeen hiddaha iyo tacliinta sare) under the Ministry of Education. She was among the first Somali women to hold ministerial office and one of the earliest university-educated female officials in the country. Alin also held senior administrative positions at the Somali National University, including Director-General and Deputy Rector.

In the early 1970s, she served on a committee tasked with drafting the Somali Family Law (Xeerka Qoyska). The committee, chaired by the Minister of Justice, included four active members—Maxamed Aadan Sheekh, Maxamed Yuusuf Weyrax, Nuura Xaaji Xasan, and Faadumo Axmed Caalin (Cureeji)—who drafted a version consistent with Islamic law, which they all signed. When the proposal was later presented to President Mohammed Siad Barre, he rejected it and, in January 1975, replaced it with a secular Family Law that declared men and women equal.

== Somali civil war ==
At the time of the collapse of the Somali government in January 1991, Alin and her mother were living in a multi-clan household in Mogadishu. Following the outbreak of violence after the division of the United Somali Congress (USC), their home was attacked and Alin's husband was seriously wounded. Hawa Jibril managed to escape to a nearby house, reportedly rebuking her daughter for kneeling before armed men during the assault.

Hawa Jibril found refuge in Canada in 1993, and Alin joined her there the following year. Both later settled in Toronto, where they worked together on literary and cultural projects related to Somali women's history and poetry.

== Translation and literary work (2008) ==
She translated and contributed the introduction to Saa Waxay Tiri / And Then She Said (2008). Saa Waxay Tiri / And Then She Said: The Poetry and Times of Hawa Jibril is a bilingual (Somali–English) work centered on the poetry and life of Hawa Jibril. The volume presents Jibril's poems alongside short contextual texts, proverbs, and commentary that reflect the experiences of Somali women across generations. It was published as an open-access cultural and linguistic resource by the Arcadia Centre (Roma Tre University), with translation and an introductory essay contributed by Fadumo Ahmed Alin.

In 2011, Her mother Hawa Jibril died.

== Public discourse and media (2010s–2020s) ==
She appeared in Somali-language programs throughout the 2010s and 2020s. In 2012, SAAB TV aired a social affairs program titled Arrimaha Bulshada featuring Fadumo Cureeji Ahmed Caalin discussing family law and women's roles. In 2018, the UNSOM Somali-language program Tubta Nabadda listed her as a guest in episodes tied to International Women's Day. In 2019, Goobjoog News labeled her in video content as Wasiir hore Faadumo Axmed Caalim (Cureeji).

== Later activities (2019) ==
In 2019 she was appointed to a reconciliation preparatory committee in Galmudug.

== Clan affiliation ==
Reports on reconciliation initiatives in Galmudug—a region frequently associated with the Hawiye / Habar Gidir clan—mention Alin's participation as a delegate, but no reliable source currently identifies her own clan affiliation.
