= Virginie Ambougou =

Gabonese royal and politician (1902–1992)

Member of the National Assembly
- In office 1961–1964

Personal details
- Born: 27 August 1902 Point Denis, Gabon
- Died: 6 May 1992 (aged 89) Libreville, Gabon

Virginie Ambougou (27 August 1902 – 6 May 1992) was a Gabonese royal and politician. The Oga of the Assiga clan, in 1961 she and Antoinette Tsono were elected to the National Assembly, becoming its first female members.

== Biography ==
Ambougou was born in Point Denis in 1902. Her father Tito Ongonwou was an aristocrat of the Mpongwe people while her mother Marie-Anne Rapontchombo was a princess of the Assiga clan, a subgroup of the Mpongwe; the two were from opposite banks of the Mbeya River. She later became Oga (queen) of the Assiga clan and had nine children.

Ambougou became involved in politics, joining the Gabonese Democratic Bloc (BDG). In the 1961 parliamentary elections she was nominated as a candidate of the National Union (an alliance of the BDG and the Gabonese Democratic and Social Union) and focused her campaign on promoting fishing cooperatives. With the alliance being the only organisation contesting the elections, she was elected to the National Assembly. Alongside Antoinette Tsono, she was one of the first two women to become members of parliament.

She was made an officer and commander of the Order of the Equatorial Star. She died in Libreville in May 1992.
