= Buraanbur =

Somali poetic form

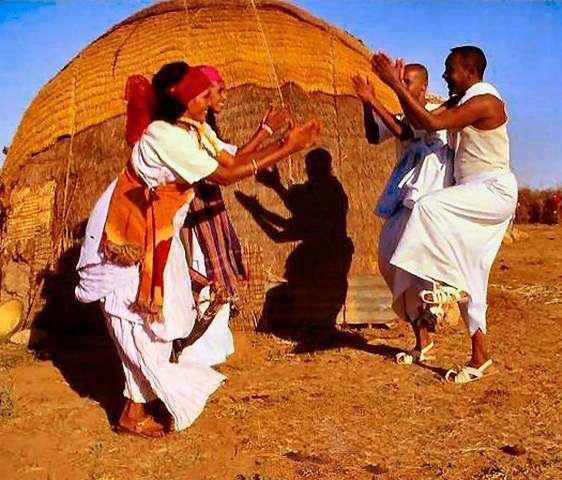
Somali heritage and culture

Buraanbur is a poetic form within traditional Somali poetry. It is usually composed by women. This traditional Somali art form is often recited with drums and paired with a dance. It is commonly performed at weddings and other gatherings.

== Overview ==
Somalis have a long tradition of poetry, with several well-developed forms of verse. Of these, the gabay (epic poem) is considered the height of poetic attainment, and is usually composed by men. Its female counterpart is the buraanbur, which is of a lighter measure (miisaan). It serves as the highest women's literary genre, and is subdivided into the hoyal, hoobeeyo and sitaat (religious song) verse forms.

The buraanbur traditionally served as an important and powerful medium used by women throughout Greater Somalia to share their thoughts, experiences and aspirations. Such poems are typically centered on topics relating to females, including child-rearing and marital relations. The poems can also deal with social and political issues in general, and are sometimes accompanied by drums, clapping, and dancing.

Buraanbur has traditionally been an important part of local culture in Greater Somalia. Historically, the verse form was employed during the independence movement. It continues to play an important role by conveying political, social and educational messages and general awareness raising. Poems composed by Halima Godane, Raha Ayaanle Guled and Hawa Jibril were powerful instruments in mobilizing constituencies against the colonial authorities. In this vein, Jibril explained why women joined the struggle against colonialism:

We wanted to break away from our seclusion,
We wanted to have the responsibility,
To express our feelings and our views,
We wanted to show our concern for our country

== See also ==
- Somali literature
