= Bernice Tlalane Mohapeloa =

Lesotho educator and activist (1899–1997)

Bernice Tlalane Mohapeloa BEM (1899–1997) was a Lesotho educator and activist.

== Early life ==
Born Nee Morolong in Mafeteng, she received her primary education there, passing her standard six examinations in 1913. The next year she began teacher training at Thabana Morena Girls' School, completing the course in 1915, and in the same year she went to South Africa to attend Lovedale High School. Receiving her junior certificate in 1918, she went to Fort Hare University College in 1919, obtaining her teacher's diploma in 1922.

== Career ==
She taught at Tiger Kloof School and then at Indana Industrial School for Girls in Natal. When appointed principal of Mafeteng Intermediate School in 1929, she became the first Basotho woman to hold this position. She introduced Girl Guiding to the school.

In 1942, Mohapeloa returned to Basutoland. In 1943, she began teaching at Basutoland High School. From 1944 until her official retirement in 1955, she taught at St Catherine's Girls Industrial School.

In 1944, Mohapeloa founded the Basutoland Homemakers' Association, modeled on similar clubs, such as the Home Improvement Club at Fort Hare University College, which she had joined in 1931. She was president of the Association from 1945 to 1983. In the 1950s, there were approximately 3000 members in more than 100 clubs within the Association and there were over 13,000 members and 200 clubs after independence.

In 1951, Mohapeloa acted as translator and lady-in-waiting to Paramount Chieftainess ‘Mantšebo Seeiso on a trip to England. In 1974, Mohapeloa became the first woman parliamentarian in Lesotho.

== Honors ==
She received the British Empire Medal in the 1946 Birthday Honours, in the same year becoming the first African woman to receive the Dorothy Cadbury Fellowship. She received the Order of Ramatseatsana from the government of Lesotho and an honorary doctorate from the National University of Lesotho in 1991.

Mohapeloa was one of the most influential women in Lesotho's modern history; among those who counted her as a role model was politician 'Matlelima Hlalele.

== Personal life ==
In 1930 she married Joel Thabiso Mohapeloa.
