= Antoinette Batumubwira =

Burundian politician

Antoinette Batumubwira (born 1956, in Ngozi, Burundi) is a Burundian politician. She was Minister of Foreign Affairs of Burundi from 2005 to 2009. She is divorced from former foreign minister Jean-Marie Ngendahayo.

== Life ==
Batumubwira was born on 1956, in Ngozi, which was then part of Ruanda-Urundi. She was born into a prominent Tutsi family. From 1979 to 1981 she completed her undergraduate studies, and afterwards worked as a journalist for the newspaper "La Voix de la Révolution du Burundi" while earning her master's degree in communications.

After Pierre Buyoya's ascension to President of Burundi in 1996, she left the country to work as head of public relations for ICO Global Communications, describing Buyoya as an autocrat. She returned back to Burundi briefly, but went to South Africa after the renewal of the Burundian Civil War in 2003. For the next two years she lived in Helsinki in Finland as a political refugee, where she learned Finnish in Vantaa. During her stay there, she was contacted by the FDD to join the new government as Minister of Foreign Affairs as they sought well-educated politically active people. This was the first government after a civil war.

In late 2007, Batumubwira was named as a candidate to succeed Alpha Oumar Konaré as Chairperson of the Commission of the African Union in the election for that post in early 2008. The government tried to obtain the support of other African countries for her candidacy, and African Great Lakes nations pledged that they would support her; however, the government later withdrew her candidacy and backed Jean Ping of Gabon.

== See also ==
- List of the first women holders of political offices in Africa
