= Madeleine Ayinkamiye =

Rwandan politician

Madeleine Ayinkamiye was a Rwandan politician. She was appointed Minister of Social Affairs in 1964, making her the first female cabinet minister in Rwanda.

Ayinkamiye served in ministerial office from 6 January 1964 to 8 November 1965. She was the only woman government minister in Rwanda between Rwanda's independence in 1962 and April 1992.
