= Hawa Jibril =

Somali poet

Hawa Jibril (1920–2011) was a Somali poet, known especially for her work in the buraanbur genre.

== Biography ==
Jibril was born into a nomadic family on the Mudug plateau. She composed her first poem at the age of twelve, inspired by a family fight. Later she became a member of the Somali Youth League. In 1993, she emigrated to Toronto, where she died, to escape the Somali Civil War; she had no papers proving Somali citizenship, and so was delayed in being naturalized. Some of her poems were later compiled and published in English and Somali by her daughter, Faduma Ahmed Alim, under the title And Then She Said, Saa Waxay Tiri. In 2007, her life and poetry were the subject of a play, Bridge of One Hair.
