= Nawal El Tatawy =

Egyptian economist (born 1942)

Minister of Economy and Foreign Trade
- In office 2 January 1996 – 8 July 1997
- President: Hosni Mubarak

Personal details
- Born: Nawal Abdel Moneim El Tatawy; 14 September 1942 (age 83) Cairo, Kingdom of Egypt
- Children: 2

Nawal El Tatawy (born 14 September 1942) is an Egyptian economist who was the minister of economy and foreign trade from 2 January 1996 to 8 July 1997. She worked at various institutions in different capacities, including the National Bank of Egypt and the World Bank.

== Early life and education ==
El Tatawy was born in Cairo on 14 September 1942. Her father, Abdel Moneim El Tatawy, was a radiologist. She graduated from the American College for Girls in Cairo and received a degree in economics and political science from the American University of Cairo. She obtained her master's degree and PhD in economics from the University of Wisconsin–Madison. Her PhD thesis is entitled Patterns of specialization and trade in manufactures: A study of selected Southeast Asian countries which she completed in 1969.

== Career ==
Following her graduation, El Tatawy worked at the National Bank of Egypt for one year between 1970 and 1971. She served at the United Nations in New York from 1973 to 1974. Then she joined the World Bank in New York in 1975 where she worked until 1979 when she was named the general manager of the investment department of the Arab Investment Bank. On 2 January 1996 she was appointed minister of economy and foreign trade, and her tenure lasted until 8 July 1997.

== Personal life and work ==
With a son from a previous marriage, El Tatawy married Mohamed Kassem with whom she had another.

She has been the author of various books. One of them is Yugoslavia: Self-management socialism and the challenges of development, report of a mission sent to Yugoslavia by the World Bank which she coauthored with Martin Schrenk and Cyrus Ardalan. The book was published by the Johns Hopkins University Press in 1979.
