= Antoinette Tsono =

Gabonese nurse and politician

Member of the National Assembly
- In office 1961–1964

Personal details
- Died: 2015

Antoinette Tsono (died 2015) was a Gabonese nurse and politician. In 1961 she and Virginie Ambougou were elected to the National Assembly, becoming its first female members.

== Biography ==
Tsono was born to a Fang father and Apindji mother. She became a nurse and had four children.

One of the best known people in Mouila, Tsono became involved in politics, joining the Gabonese Democratic Bloc (BDG). In the 1961 parliamentary elections she was nominated as a candidate of the National Union, an alliance of the BDG and the Gabonese Democratic and Social Union. With the alliance being the only organisation contesting the elections, she was elected to the National Assembly. Alongside Virginie Ambougou, she was one of the first two women to become members of parliament.

She died in 2015.
