= Charlotte Kisimba =

Congolese politician

Charlotte Kisimba is a Congolese politician. She served as Minister of Public Service in 1970. She was the first woman cabinet minister in Republic of the Congo.
