= Venice Kamel Gouda =

Egyptian academic and minister (1934–2021)

- فينيس كامل جودة

Minister of State for Scientific Research
- In office October 1993 – July 1997
- President: Hosni Mubarak
- Prime Minister: Atef Sedky; Kamal Ganzouri
- Preceded by: Adel Ezz
- Succeeded by: Mufid Shehab

Personal details
- Born: October 7, 1934 Cairo, Kingdom of Egypt
- Died: March 21, 2021 (aged 86) Cairo, Egypt
- Education: Ain Shams University (B.S. 1956); Cairo University (M.S. 1959, Ph.D. 1962)
- Occupation: Chemist, academic, politician
- Profession: Research professor
- Awards: State Merit Prize in Basic Sciences (2003)

Venice Kamel Gouda (7 October 1934 – 21 March 2021) was an Egyptian research professor and a Minister of State for Scientific Research from 1993 to 1997.

== Early life ==
Daughter to accountant Kamel Gouda and his wife Victoria Attalah, Venice was born on 7 October 1934 and received her B.Sc. degree from Ain Shams University in 1956. She did her M.Sc. (1959) and PhD (1962) from Cairo University.

== Career ==
Gouda began her career as an assistant research chemist at the National Research Centre (NRC) in 1956 and from 1962 to 1966, was an associate professor at the Clarkson College of Technology. In 1991, she became the director of NRC's applied inorganic chemistry division. In October 1993 Egyptian President Hosni Mubarak appointed her the Minister of State for Scientific Research, a post she held till July 1997.

Gouda was an active member of the International Corrosion Council and headed several Egyptian delegations to foreign countries. In recognition of her contributions to scientific research, the Egyptian Academy of Scientific Research and Technology honoured her in 1974. She was also awarded by the NRC and presidential decoration (1976). She won the State Appreciation Prize in Basic Sciences in 2003.

== Death ==
Gouda died on 21 March 2021, at the age of 86.
