= Halima Godane =

Somali poet and activist

- Born: 1935; Kismayo
- Died: 1994 (aged 58–59)
- Occupations: poet and activist.

Halima Mohamed Yusuf, better known as Halima Godane ("the stooped one") (1935–1994) was a Somali poet and activist.

== Biography ==
Born in Kismayo, Godane was married at age nine to Bulqaas of Ali Seleebaan. She moved to Mogadishu in the later 1940s, joining the Somali Youth League; in the early 1950s, she was elected a member of the party's women's committee. On national occasions she would recite buraanbur poetry, entertaining crowds at the regular party meetings as well. On October 12, 1954, she first recited what would become her best-known work, an ode to the flag of Somalia. In 1958, she was among those who supported Haaji Mahammad Husseen in his desire to form the Greater Somalia League; that same year, she was elected to Mogadishu's city council. In 1967, she again switched parties, to the Workers' Socialist Party, and in 1974, she received an award and lifetime monthly pension from Mogadishu authorized by Mohamed Siad Barre. Godane remained steadfast in her socialist beliefs and desire to see a unified Somalia until her death.
