= Salwa El-Deghali =

Libyan academic

Salwa Fawzi El-Deghali
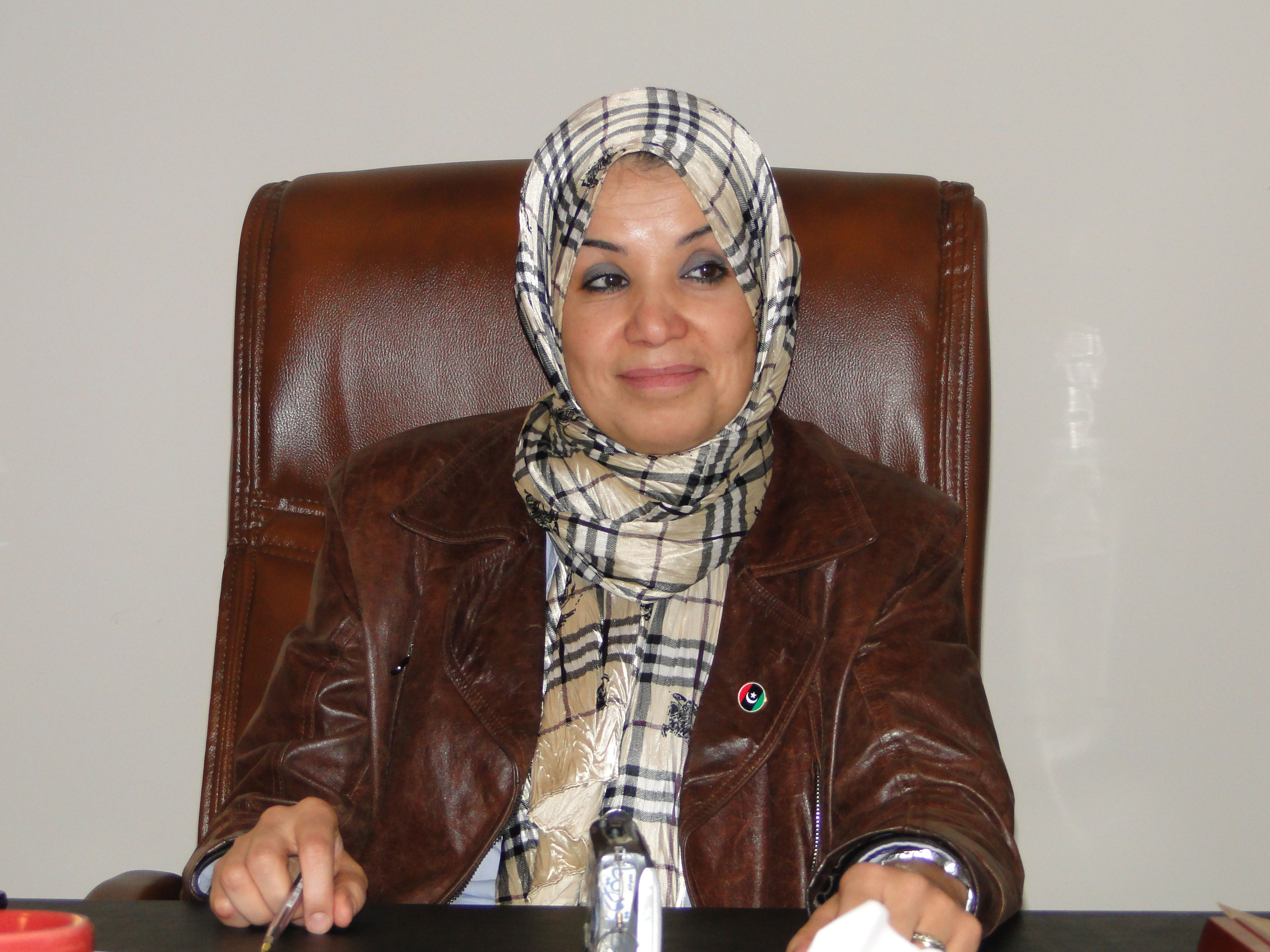
- El-Deghali in 2011
- Citizenship: Liberia
- Education: Doctor of Philosophy in Constitutional Law
- Occupations: Academic, Lawyer

Salwa Fawzi El-Deghali (Arabic: سلوى فوزي الدغٌيلًي) is a Libyan academic and a member of the National Transitional Council representing women and in charge of legal affairs. El-Deghali possess a Doctor of Philosophy in constitutional law. She taught at the Academy of Graduate Studies in Benghazi.

El-Deghali is one of three women on the National Transitional Council, though she is the only one who has been publicly identified. El-Deghali represents women's interests and also is responsible for Legal Affairs; she heads the Legal Advisory Committee as part of this role. She has warned against the possibility of a pro-Gaddafi fifth column within the National Liberation Army. Her position also gives her the responsibility of investigating the crimes of mercenaries employed by Muammar Gaddafi and collecting and presenting evidence of his war crimes to the International Criminal Court. Her primary responsibility will be to help form a functioning government, writing laws to be in effect during the transition period, and preparing for elections. However, she has stated that the job of writing a constitution for the country will fall to an elected assembly and not her Legal Advisory Committee.
