= Antoniette Oliveira =

Gabonese politician

Antoniette Oliveira is a Gabonese politician. She served as Minister of Social Affairs and Women in 1980. She was the first woman cabinet minister in Gabon.

== See also ==
- Politics of Gabon
