= Youdith Imre =

Ethiopian politician

Youdith Imre (b. 1929-) is an Ethiopian politician. She served as Assistant Minister of Foreign Affairs in 1966-1971, and Deputy Minister of Foreign Affairs in 1971-1975. She was the first woman cabinet minister in Ethiopia. She was ambassador to Denmark, Sweden, Norway, Finland and Iceland in 1975-1977.
