= Julie Manning =

Tanzanian lawyer, judge and politician (1939–2026

High Court judge
- In office 1973–1975

Minister of Justice
- In office 1975–1983

Personal details
- Born: 24 January 1939 Morogoro, Tanzania
- Died: 20 March 2026 (aged 87)
- Education: University College of Dar es Salaam (LLB)
- Occupation: Lawyer, judge, politician

Julie Catherine Manning (24 January 1939 – 20 March 2026) was a Tanzanian lawyer, judge and politician. The first Tanzanian woman to study law, she was a High Court judge before serving as Minister of Justice from 1975 to 1983.

== Early life and education ==
Manning was born on 24 January 1939 in Morogoro, Tanzania, to William Manning and Margaret Maria Manning. Julie Manning was the second of eight children. She was sent to Moravian Primary School in Mbeya, later attending Loleza Girl's Secondary School and Tabora Girl's School. She joined the faculty of law at the University College Dar es Salaam (now University of Dar es Salaam; UDSM) in 1961, graduating in 1963. She was the only woman in her class of 14 students.

== Career ==
Manning later worked as a law draughtswoman in the Attorney General's Chamber. In 1973, she was appointed judge of the High Court of Tanzania, making her the first African woman High Court judge in east or central Africa. She was named Minister of Justice in 1975, making her one of the first two women to serve in a Tanzanian cabinet, alongside Tabitha Siwale.

After Joseph Warioba succeeded Manning as Justice Minister in 1983, she worked as a counsel at the Tanzanian embassy in Ottawa, Canada. She was appointed a full-time commissioner for the Tanzanian Law Reform Commission from 1993 to 2002. Starting in 1998, she served as chairperson for the National Parole Board. She served as a non-full time commissioner for the National Electoral Commission for three consecutive five-year terms until 2008.

== Death ==
Manning died on 20 March 2026 at Hitech Sai Health Centre in Dar es Salaam, where she was receiving treatment. She was 87. Tributes from Tanzania's legal sector were given. Her burial ceremony was planned to be held on 24 March at St. Peter's Church in Oyster Bay, Dar es Salaam.

== Awards and honours ==
Manning was awarded a national medal by former president Jakaya Kikwete in 2011. That October, UDSM renamed its Residence Hall No. 3, a women's hall on main campus, to Julie Manning Hall in her honour.

== See also ==
- List of first women lawyers and judges in Africa
