= Woizero Mary Tadesso =

Ethiopian politician

Minister of Education

Personal details
- Born: 1932

Woizero Mary Tadesso or Mary Tadesse (born 1932) is an Ethiopian politician.

She served as Minister of Education in Ethiopia.

In 2021 she published her diary-based memoirs: My Life, My Ethiopia.

== Early life and career ==
Tadesse was born into a small Catholic family. She is one of the first generation of educated Ethiopians with Western education.

She served in the Ethiopian Emperor Haile Selassie government as one of the highest-ranking women.

== Books/publications ==
- African Women and Development: A History

Book by Margaret C. Snyder and Woizero Mary Tadesso

- My Life, My Ethiopia: A Diary of History and Love

Book by Woizero Mary Tadesso
