= Point Denis =

Seaside resort in Gabon

Coordinates: 0°19′01″N 9°22′01″E

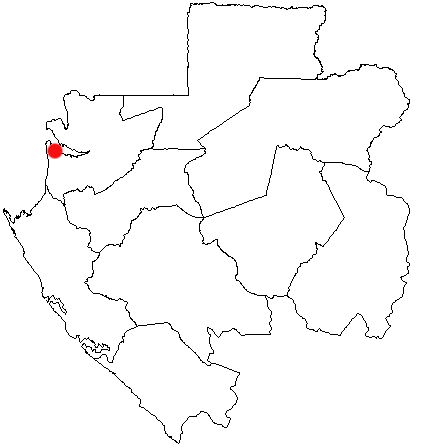
Location of Point Denis in Gabon

Point Denis is a seaside resort in Gabon. It lies on a peninsula between the Atlantic Ocean and the Gabon Estuary, across which boats sail to Libreville. It also lies near the Pongara National Park.

== Wildlife ==
=== Leatherback turtles ===
Point Denis is a major breeding ground for the leatherback turtle (Dermochelys coriacea). Between 1 800 and 2 000 nests are laid annually on its beaches. Recent studies by Dr Sharon Deem, formerly of the Wildlife Conservation Society, note that the worldwide turtle population is being threatened by human activity. One such activity is the development of Point Denis. Turtles find their way to the sea by using the light from the moon shimmering off the water as a reference. Man-made artificial lights at night disorientate the female turtles during laying season as well as the hatchlings trying to find their way to the water. As a result, many turtles head off in the wrong direction and can die from starvation and dehydration. Nests are also destroyed by visitors who drive vehicles, mainly quad bikes, on the beaches. Another problem is the pollution from the nearby town of Libreville. Turtles often mistake plastic bags in the water for jellyfish, their principal food source, and die if they ingest them. Nevertheless, there is a growing environmental movement in Gabon, protection of the turtles being one of their priorities.

=== Other species ===
Wildebeest are found in the area, as well as a diverse population of monkeys, birds, snakes and other reptiles. Humpback whales can be seen in the sea.

== Gallery ==
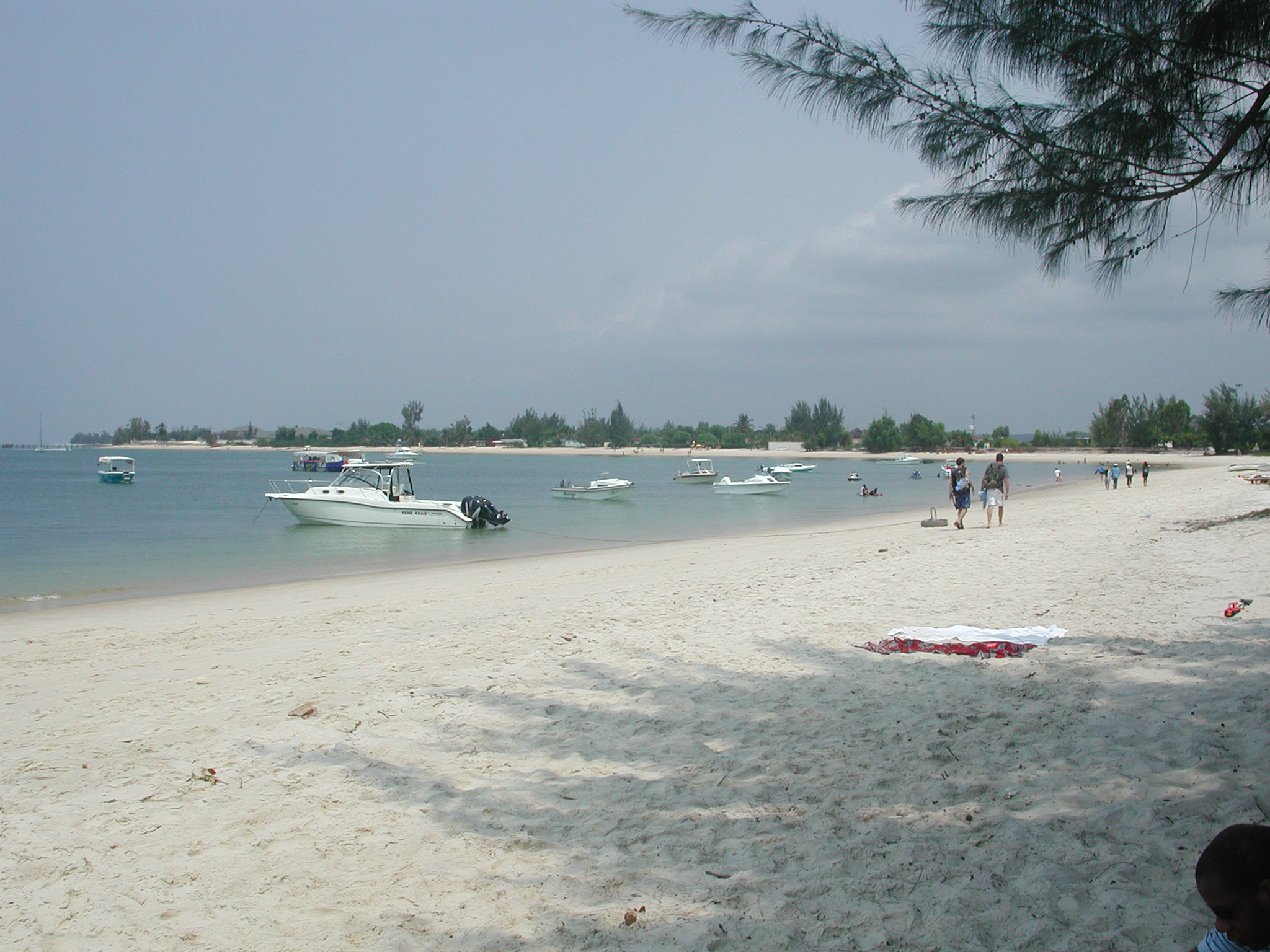
Point Denis

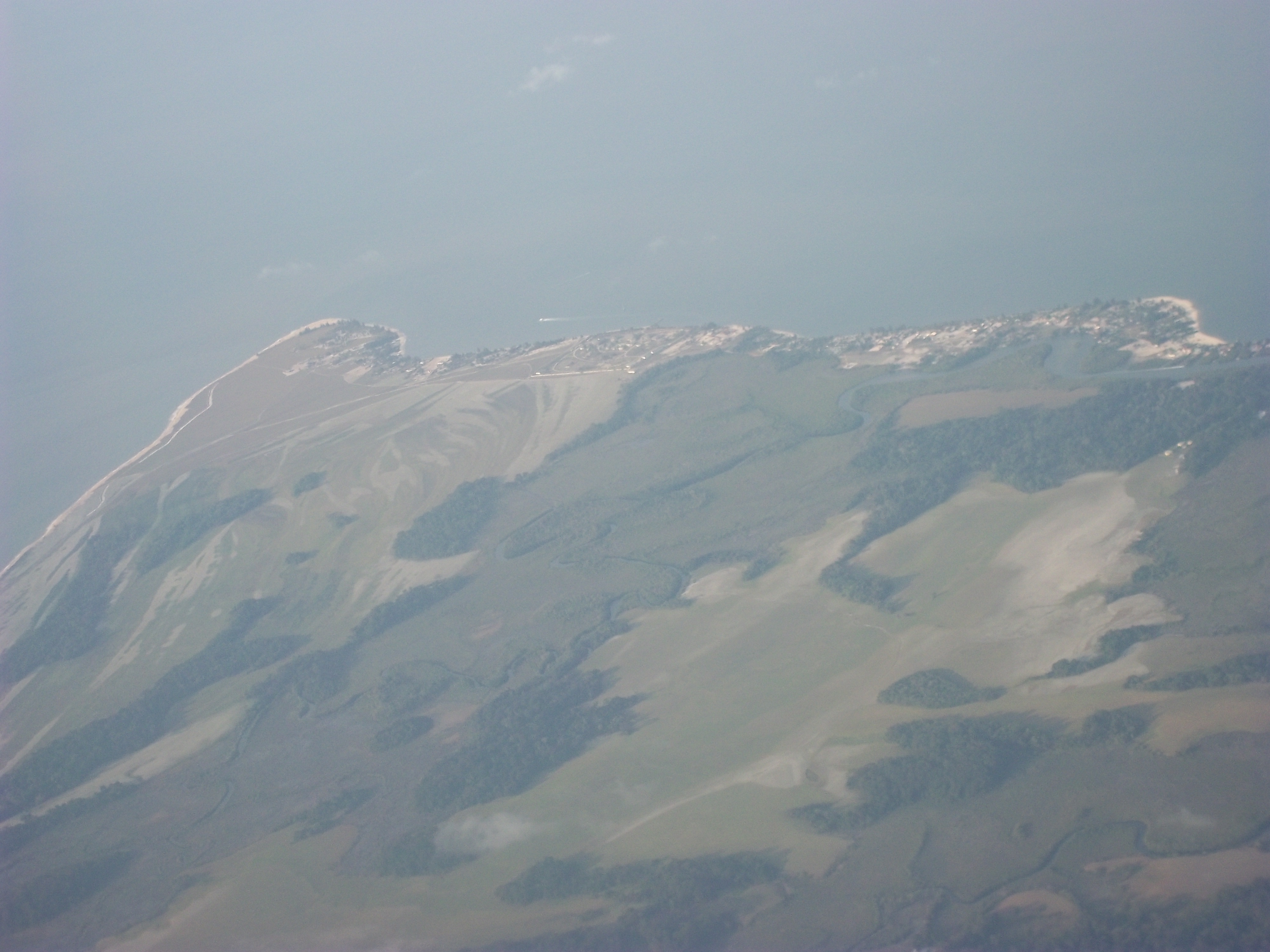
Point Denis from the air showing development by man.

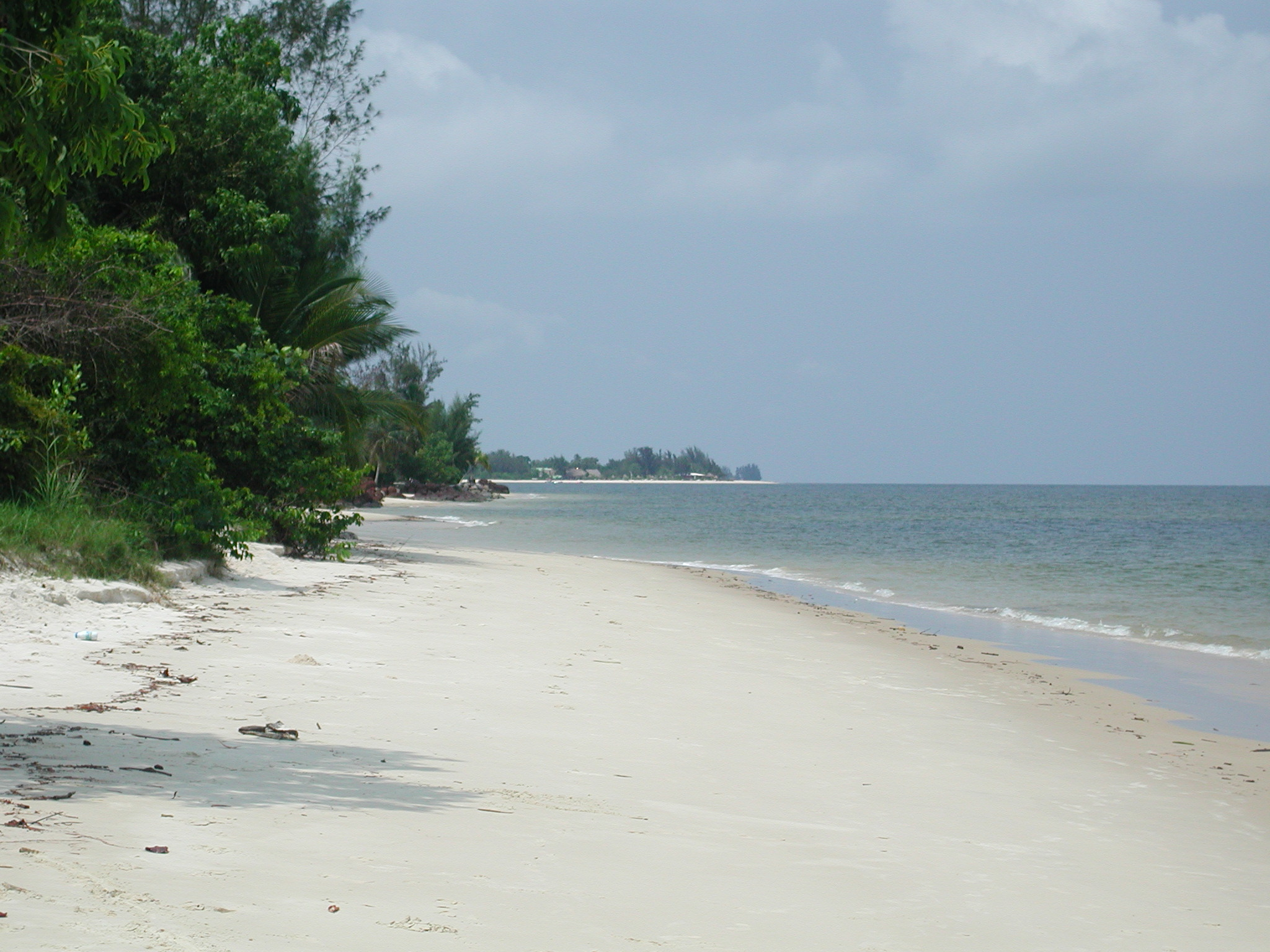
Point Denis 2 km to the south.

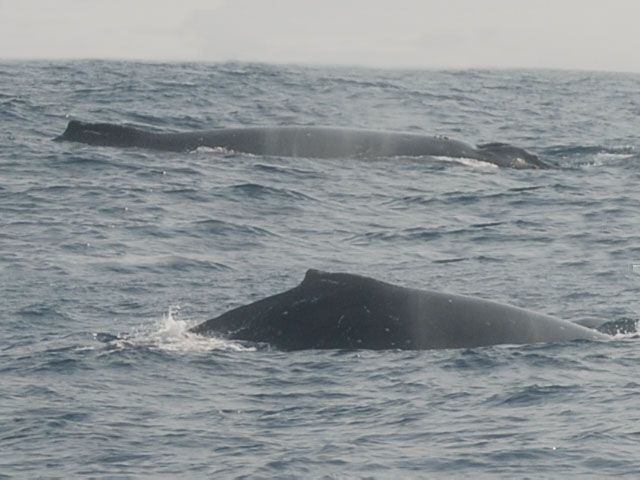
A pair of whales near Point Denis.
