= University of Abu Bekr Belkaid =

University in Tlemcen, Algeria

Coordinates: 34.9196°N 1.3017°W

University of Tlemcen
- جامعة تلمسان
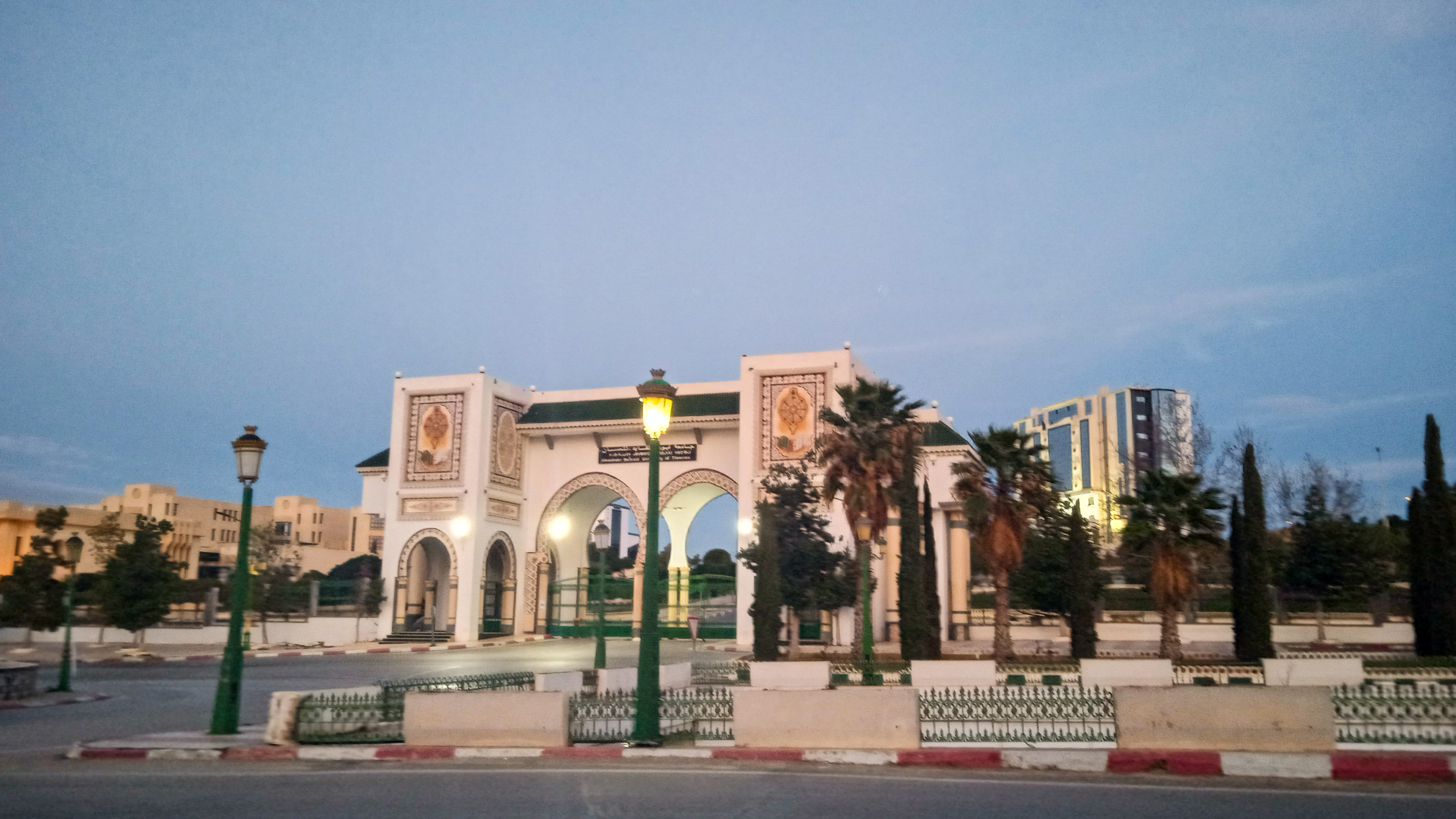
- Type: Public
- Established: 1 August 1989; 37 years ago
- Affiliations: Association of Francophone Universities
- Rector: Mourad Meghachou
- Total staff: 2,013
- Students: 48,870
- Location: Tlemcen, Tlemcen, 13000, Algeria
- Campus: Multiple sites
- Colors
- Website: www.univ-tlemcen.dz

The University of Tlemcen or University of Abu Bekr Belkaid (Arabic: جامعة تلمسان) is a public university located in Tlemcen, Algeria.It was created by a 1989 decree and has eight schools and several campuses all located in the state of Tlemcen.

== History ==
From 1974 to 1980, higher education was first provided in a university center which grouped the only core subjects of the exact sciences and biology. This teaching has spread to new fields over the years. In June 1984, the first promotions in the social sciences and humanities in the national language took place; in August 1984, the creation of national higher education institutes and new courses. The university was created by decree no. 89-138 of August 1, 1989, modified and supplemented by executive decree no. 95-205 of August 5, 1995, then modified by executive decree no. 98-391 of December 2, 1998.

== Faculties ==
Abou Bekr Belkaid University consists of eight schools, each of which has one or more departments:

- Faculty of Science
- Faculty of Technology
- Faculty of Law and Political Science
- Faculty of Letters and Languages
- Faculty of Natural and Life Sciences and Earth and Universe Sciences
- Faculty of Medicine Dr Benzerdjeb Benaouda
- Faculty of Economics, Business and Management Sciences
- Faculty of Human and Social Sciences

== Campuses ==
The university has five campuses:

- New pole (ring road pole)
- Chetouane
- Imama pole
- Center town pole
- Kiffane pole

== Rankings ==
It is ranked by the Times Higher Education between 121 and 140 in the 2022 regional ranking of Arab universities, and 1501+ in the world ranking of universities.that

In 2022 the university was ranked 2nd in the national ranking of universities made by the Ministry of Higher Education and Scientific Research in Algeria.

== Child organization ==
- Pan African University Institute of Water and Energy Science
