= Véronique Ahoyo =

Beninese politician and diplomat

Minister of Labour and Social Affairs
- In office 1990–1993
- President: Nicéphore Soglo

Personal details
- Born: June 29, 1939 Cotonou, French Dahomey
- Died: December 14, 2008 (aged 69) Bassila, Benin
- Education: University of Abidjan

Véronique Ahoyo Ahogo (June 29, 1939 - December 14, 2008) was a Beninese politician, diplomat, and civil administrator. She served Minister of Labour and Social Affairs and as Beninese ambassador to Canada.

== Biography ==
Born in Cotonou, Ahoyo received training in civil administration in Paris and Abidjan, and in social services in Toulouse. Returning to Benin, she took a post as deputy director of social affairs in 1967. In 1972, she graduated with a master's degree in Applied Social Sciences from the University of Abidjan in Côte d'Ivoire. She was promoted to director of social affairs in 1975. She left the role in 1990; in March of that year she was named Minister of Labour and Social Affairs. Ahoyo also served as the Beninese ambassador to Canada, having been nominated to the position in 1996.

== Death ==
Ahoyo was killed in an automobile accident on the Bassila highway when the vehicle in which she was traveling lost control after a tire burst. Four others were also killed and two injured; among the latter was former Minister of Public Health Rafiatou Karimou.
