= Mariam Mahamat Nour =

Chadian politician (born 1956)

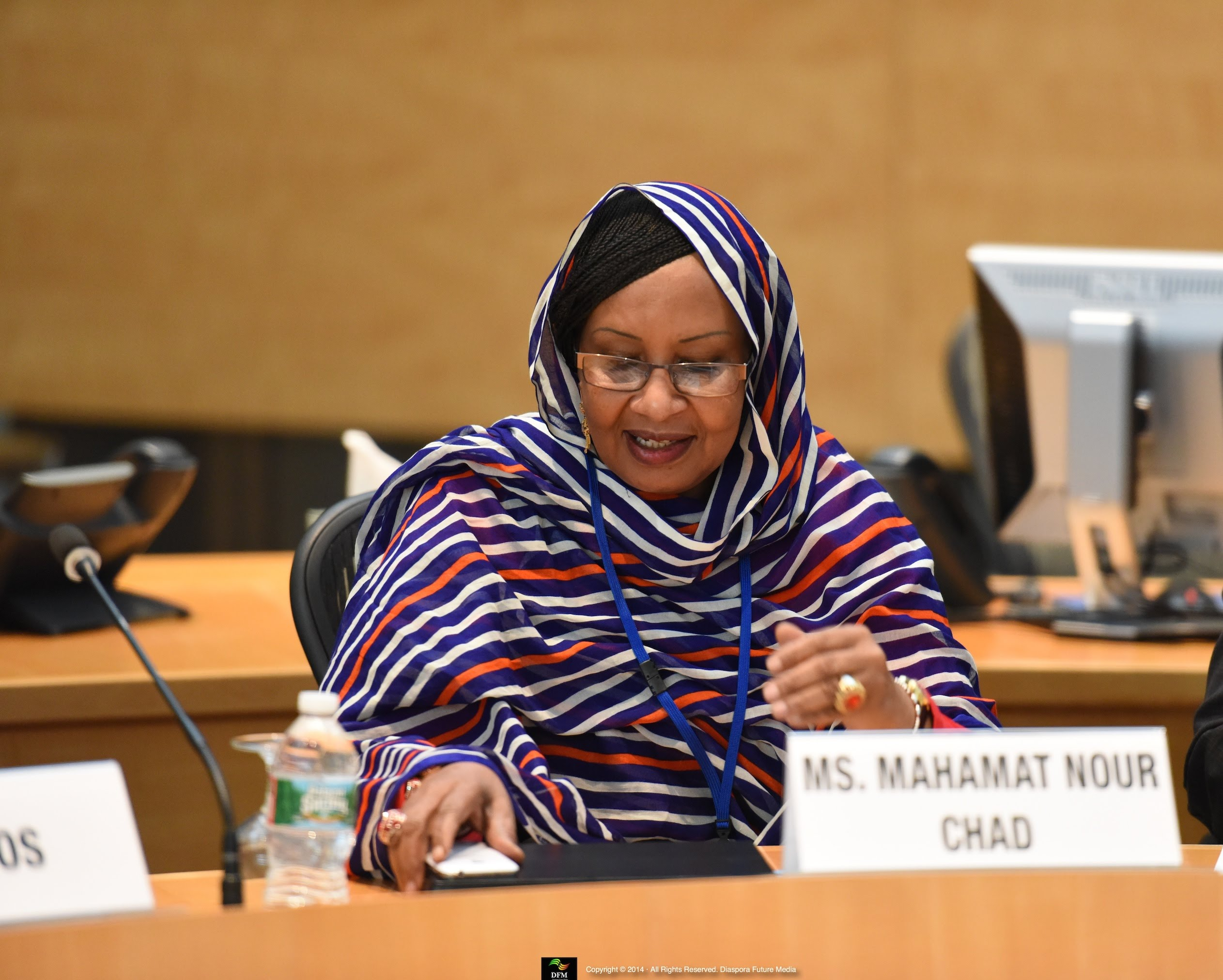
- Born: 17 July 1956 (age 70)
- Occupations: Politician, economist, Secretary General and minister of Economy and Planning in the Republic of Chad
- Employer(s): Ministry of Economy and Planning in the Republic of Chad

Mariam Mahamat Nour (born 17 July 1956) is a politician, economist and the Minister of Economy and Planning in the Republic of Chad.

Nour has been Secretary General of the Government and minister responsible for relations with parliament since May 7, 2018.

== Honors ==
- Déco Officière de l'ordre national du Mérite (France, 2019)
