= Fatimé Kimto =

Chadian politician

- Died: 21 May 2015; N'Djamena
- Citizenship: Chad
- Occupation: Politician
- Known for: issues relating to labor and the condition of workers in Chad and the rights of women in Chadian society.

Fatimé Kimto

(died May 21, 2015) was a Chadian politician. She was the first woman to serve in a cabinet position in the country's history.

Kimto was a Muslim from the southern part of the country. She was first named to the cabinet in 1982, becoming the Minister of Social Affairs and Women; she remained in the post until 1984. She served twice more in the cabinet during her career; she was Minister of Social Action and Family from 1999 to 2001 and again from 2004 to 2005, and she was Minister of Civil Service, Labour, and Employment from 2005 to 2007. In the second capacity she addressed a meeting of the United Nations General Assembly in 2000, taking as her subject the equality of the sexes. During her early career she was also a member of the politburo of the National Union for Independence and Revolution. Among matters with which she concerned herself while in government were issues relating to labor and the condition of workers in Chad and the rights of women in Chadian society.

Kimto died in N'Djamena after a lengthy illness; Her death was barely noted by the sitting government.
