= Euphrasie Kandeke =

Burundian politician

Euphrasie Kandeke was a Burundian politician. She was named Minister for Women's Questions by Jean-Baptiste Bagaza in 1982 (some sources state instead that she took the position in 1974.) She served alongside Caritas Mategeko Karadereye, who at the time was the Minister of Social Affairs; the two were the first women to serve in the Burundian cabinet. She remained in her position until 1987. During her career, she also served as the secretary general of the Burundian Women's Federation, and was a member of the political bureau of the Union for National Progress. Later she was imprisoned, being taken into custody the night before the 1987 coup; among her offenses was held to be the suggestion that the army size should be smaller. While in jail she was served Fanta lemonade mixed with salt, among other hardships. Kandeke was a Tutsi.

== See also ==
- List of the first women holders of political offices in Africa
