= Néziha Zarrouk =

Tunisian politician

Néziha Zarrouk, also Naziha, (born 12 December 1946) is a Tunisian politician and diplomat who was a government minister from 1995 to 2002 under Prime Minister Mohamed Ghannouchi. In 1998, she was able to report on improvements in women's health and women's rights to the United Nations Expert Group Meeting on "Women and Health" which she hosted in Tunis. From 2003 to 2005, Zarrouk served as Tunisia's ambassador to Lebanon. In May 2019, she became a member of the Tahya Tounes party.

== Biography ==
Born on 12 December 1946 in Jemmal near Monastir, Néziha Zarrouk earned a master's degree in Arabic, allowing her to teach Arabic language and literature in the secondary schools of Tunis. Responding to Ben Ali's call for support after he became president on 7 November 1987, she joined the Democratic Constitutional Rally (RDC).

From 1989, she played a leading role in the National Union of Tunisian Women, chairing its youth otganization. After various appointments in the RCD, in March 1995 she became a deputy minister in the department for Women's and Family Affairs, earning the position of full minister with a separate ministry in November 1999. In 1998, Zarrouk represented the Prime Minister in charge of Women's and Family Affairs at the United Nations meeting on Women and Health which was held in Tunis (28 September to 2 October). She was able to report on substantial improvements in women's rights, women's health and in particular women's life expectancy which had increased by 22 years (1966–1996).

In early October 2001, she was appointed Minister of Professional Training and Employment, replacing Faiza Kefi who had been appointed ambassador to Paris. She held this position until September 2002. In 2003, she was appointed Tunisia's ambassador to Lebanon until 2005. From 2005 to 2011, she was vice-president of Tunisia's upper house, the Chamber of Councillors.

Together with her brother Mohamed Sahbi Basli, in May 2019 she joined the Tahya Tounes party.
