= Pierrette Kombo =

Congolese politician (1939–2019)

Member of the National Assembly
- In office 1963–
- Constituency: Brazzaville

Personal details
- Born: 9 May 1939; Bangui, Ubangi-Shari
- Died: 29 June 2019 (aged 80); Saint-Herblain, France

Pierrette Kombo (9 May 1939 – 29 June 2019) was a Congolese politician. In 1963 she was one of the first group of three women elected to the National Assembly alongside Micheline Golengo and Mambou Aimée Gnali.

== Biography ==
Kombo was born Pierrette Loubaki in May 1939 in Bangui. She married Augustin Kombo.

An active member of the Revolutionary Union of the Women of Congo, she joined the National Movement of the Revolution (MNR) and was a candidate for the party in the 1963 parliamentary elections. With no opposition contesting the elections, she was elected to the National Assembly from the Brazzaville constituency, becoming one of the first group of three women to enter parliament.

She died in Saint-Herblain in France in June 2019.
