= Micheline Golengo =

Congolese politician

Member of the National Assembly
- In office 1963–
- Constituency: Brazzaville

Member of the Senate
- In office –2009
- Constituency: Cuvette-Ouest

Personal details
- Born: 13 September 1940; Brazzaville, Moyen-Congo
- Died: 13 February 2009 (aged 68); Choisy-le-Roi, France

Micheline Golengo (13 September 1940 – 13 February 2009) was a Congolese politician. In 1963 she was one of the first group of three women elected to the National Assembly alongside Pierrette Kombo and Mambou Aimée Gnali.

== Biography ==
Golengo was born in Brazzaville in 1940. Initially a primary school teacher, she entered the diplomatic service in 1960. She and her sister Victoire were the first two Congolese women parachutists.

Golengo joined the National Movement of the Revolution (MNR) and was a candidate for the party in the 1963 parliamentary elections. With no opposition contesting the elections, she was elected to the National Assembly from the Brazzaville constituency, becoming one of the first group of three women to enter parliament. After joining the Congolese Party of Labour, the successor to the MNR, she later served as a Senator for Cuvette-Ouest.

She died in Choisy-le-Roi in France in February 2009.
