= Sittou Raghadat Mohamed =

Comorian politician

High Commissioner for the Status of Women 3
- In office Between 1991 – 1996

Minister of Social Affairs
- In office Between 1991 – 1996

Special Advisor to the President of the Republic
- In office Between 1991 – 1996

Deputy Secretary General of the Government
- In office Between 1991 – 1996

Secretary of State for Population and the Condition of Women
- In office August 1991 – ?
- President: Said Mohamed Djohar

Personal details
- Born: 6 July 1952 (age 72); Ouani, Anjouan, Comoros

Sittou Raghadat Mohamed (born 6 July 1952) is a Comorian former minister and deputy of the Comoros, and was the first Comorian woman to be appointed to a senior government role, as Secretary of State for Population and the Condition of Women.She has been described by the Comorian media as a symbol of Comoran women's struggle, and as the pioneer and reference point for women in the Comoros, and is the first woman minister and elected deputy in the Comoros.

== Early life ==
Sittou Raghadat Mohamed was born on 6 July 1952 in Ouani, Anjouan, Comoros.

== Career ==
Mohamed was a teacher for several years, teaching French, history and geography in different high schools and colleges in the Comoros.

In August 1991, she became the first Comorian woman to be appointed to a senior government role, as Secretary of State for Population and the Condition of Women, by President Said Mohamed Djohar.

From 1991 to 1996, she assumed high political responsibilities: High Commissioner for the Status of Women 3, Minister of Social Affairs, Special Advisor to the President of the Republic, Deputy Secretary General of the Government, elected Deputy.

In addition to her political activities, she has been a teacher at IFERE (Institute for Teacher Training and Research in Education) at the University of Comoros and president of FAWECOM (Forum of Educators in the Comoros), a branch of the NGO FAWE (Forum of African Educators) for several years.

In a 2 May 1994 conference plenary, Mohamed, then the Minister of Social Affairs, Population, Employment and Work, called for "support for her government's sustainable development plans; change in macro-economic factors that affect SIDS' economies; increased ODA; and preferential trade."

In the 11th Meeting of the UN Conference on Women in Beijing in September 1995, Mohamed noted that significant progress in "mainstreaming women" had been made in the Comoros, with a woman appointed to the Supreme Court, and women in the National Assembly, but that the country needed greater financial commitments from the developed world to address poverty, malnutrition and infectious disease.

In 2001, she was called a "dedicated activist".

Sittou Raghadat Mohamed is currently secretary general of the political party Rally for Democracy and Renewal (RDR), and a municipal councilor for the town of Ouani (Ndzuwani-Comoros).
