= Tabitha Siwale =

Tanzanian politician (1938–2025)

Tabitha Siwale (July 28, 1938 – March 12, 2025) was an educator and politician in Tanzania. In 1975, she was one of the first women to become a government minister in Tanzania.

In addition to her stints as minister of lands and minister of education, Siwale spent 25 years in the Tanzanian National Assembly.

== Biography ==
Tabitha Ijumba Wilfred Mwambenja was born in Tukuyu, in what was then the Tanganyika Territory, in 1938. Her father, Wilfred Mwambenja, and other relatives were involved in politics during the country's struggle for independence.

Having attended a Native Authority primary school, in 1951 she enrolled in the Tosamaganga Girls' Secondary School, where she met her future husband, Edmond Siwale, who attended the corresponding boys' school.

After pursuing further studies at Geita Girls' Secondary School and Mpwapwa Teacher's College, Siwale began working as a teacher in 1961. From 1965 to 1968, she studied home economics at the University of Nairobi. On her return, she continued teaching, eventually becoming head teacher at multiple schools. She and her husband had four children: Fred, Mary, Abel, and Maka.

Siwale's husband predeceased her in 2016. She died in Dar es Salaam in 2025 at age 86.

== Political career ==
Siwale's interest in politics began at a young age, when she began attending meetings of the Tanganyika African National Union (TANU), despite her father's demands that she focus on her studies instead. In 1962, she was involved in the inaugural meeting of the Tanzanian national women's organization Umoja Wa Wanawake Wa Tanzania. Later, in the mid-1970s, she spent almost a year undergoing socialist political training with fellow head teachers from across the country at TANU's Kivukoni Ideological College.

On November 9, 1975, Tanzanian President Julius Nyerere appointed her as minister of land and urban settlement development. Alongside Julie Manning, who was appointed minister of justice at the same time, Siwale became one of the first two women to be named a first minister in the country. A few days earlier, she had also become a member of the National Assembly, filling one of several seats appointed directly by the president.

After the 1980 election, Siwale was transferred to become minister of education. Two years later, she reassumed the minister of lands portfolio, which she held until the ministry was dissolved in 1984. She continued to serve in the National Assembly until 2000. While in parliament, she worked to further women's rights, particularly their right to own land.
