= Anna 'Matlelima Hlalele =

Life of Mosotho female politician

Anna 'Matlelima Hlalale
- Born: 1929; Teyateyaneng, Lesotho, British Empire
- Died: 24 March 2024 (aged 94); Maseru, Lesotho

Anna 'Matlelima Hlalele (1929 – 24 March 2024) was a Mosotho politician who was an assistant government minister, who was considered to be the first female government minister in Lesotho.

== Biography ==
Hlalele was born in Teyateyaneng, Lesotho in 1929, to the family of a factory worker. She first attended Randfontein Methodist School, graduating with a first-class pass and heading to Basutoland High School, where she earned a Cape Senior Certificate and became an assistant teacher. A three-year course at the University of Bristol followed, at the end of which she received a certificate in education. In 1961 she became a community development specialist in the Department of Local Government, transferring to the Department of Agriculture the next year and launching pilot nutrition programs; she also began a series of weekly programs on cleanliness, child care, and nutrition on Radio Lesotho. From 1969 to 1970 Hlalele was at the University of Ibadan studying food sciences and applied nutrition, returning to Lesotho to head the nutrition and home economics branches of the Ministry of Agriculture. She retired from the civil service in 1977 and established and led a home economics department at Maseru's Machabeng High School.

After the 1986 coup d'état that deposed Leabua Jonathan, Hlalele became the first woman to serve in a high-level position in the cabinet of Lesotho when she was appointed to the position of assistant minister of state in the Ministry of Cooperatives, Rural Development, Youth, Sports, and Women's Affairs; she described Bernice Tlalane Mohapeloa and 'Masechele Khaketla as her role models. She traveled to Beijing in this capacity in 1987. In 1989 she joined the board of Lesotho Opportunities Industrialization Center; in 1991 she became chair of the SOS Children's Village Board, working to open a local branch in Lesotho. In 1995 the group opened a Hermann Gmeiner School in Lithabeneng. In 2001 she retired as chair, and became the first southern African to receive the Save Our Souls Children's Villages Order of Merit; she has also received nearly every award possible from the government of Lesotho. She established the Maseru Women Senior Citizens Association in 1992, and in 2002 the group joined the World Assembly on Aging in developing a strategy to protect the welfare of seniors worldwide. She has also worked to inform the elderly about AIDS and other human rights issues.

Hlalele died from complications of a fall in Maseru, on 24 March 2024, at the age of 94.
