= Zahra Dardouri =

Algerian politician

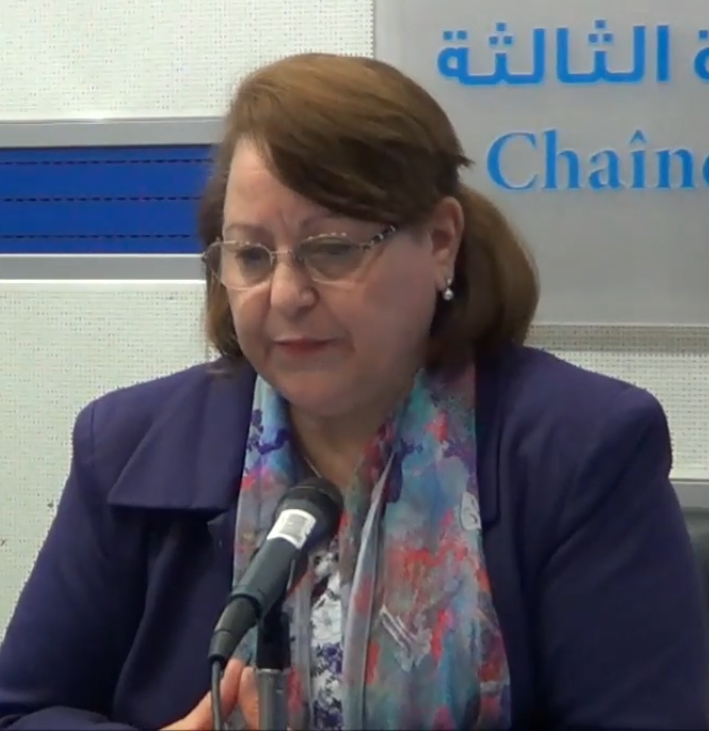
- Derdouri in 2015

Minister of Post and Telecommunications
- In office 2014 – 14 May 2015
- President: Abdelaziz Bouteflika
- Prime Minister: Abdelmalek Sellal; Youcef Yousfi; Abdelmalek Sellal

Personal details
- Born: February 6, 1955 (age 71)

Zahra Dardouri (born Boumaza on 6 February 1955 in Batna) is an Algerian teacher, politician and former minister.

== Career ==
In 2014, Zohra Dardouri was appointed Minister of Post and Telecommunications by President Bouteflika together with six other women ministers. She focused on the implementation of information and communication technologies in the more isolated areas of Algeria and on providing a stable and fast Internet connection throughout the country. On 14 May 2015, she left the government following a reshuffle.
