= Rafiatou Karimou =

Beninese politician (1946–2018)

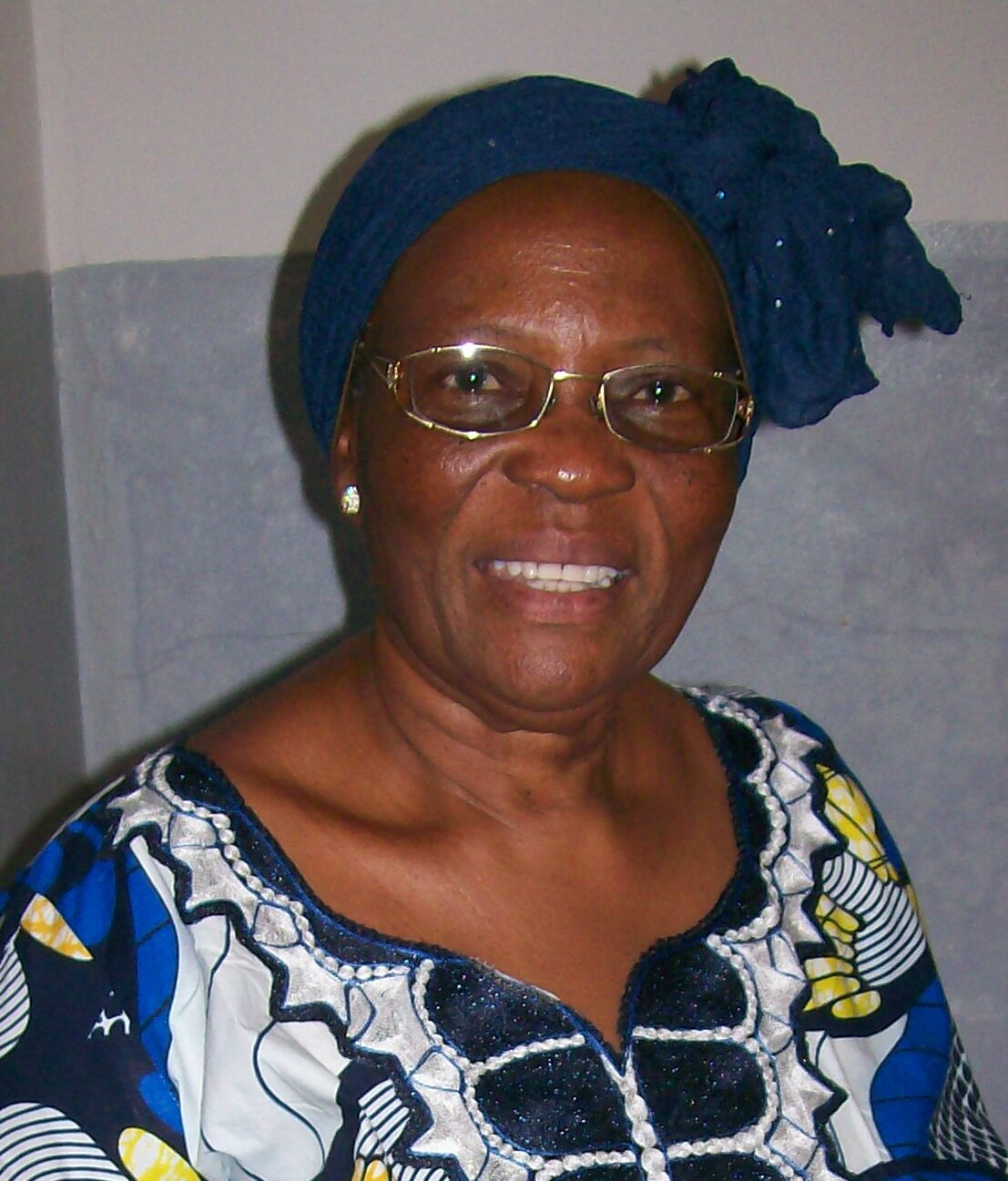
- Rafiatou Karimou
- Born: May 2, 1946; Sakété, French Dahomey
- Died: January 4, 2018; Paris, France
- Citizenship: Benin
- Occupations: Politician; Teacher; Minister
- Known for: First woman to serve as a minister in Benin

Rafiatou Karimou (2 May 1946 – 4 January 2018) was a Beninese politician and teacher by profession. Karimou was the first woman to be appointed to the position of a minister in her country.

== Biography ==
Rafiatou Karimou was born in 1946 in Sakété, in the south of present-day Benin, then Colony of Dahomey. She began to campaign in her youth in the General Union of Pupils and Students of Dahomey (UGEED) before engaging in politics. In 1975, she was the first woman to be appointed district chief in Benin and in 1989, she became the first woman minister in her country after she was appointed Minister of Public Health by President Mathieu Kérékou.

She held this position until 1990. She was appointed minister again from 2003 to 2006, this time to head the portfolio of Minister of Primary and Secondary Education.

She first got elected into the Benin National Assembly in 1999, and returned to parliament in 2003 representing the African Movement for Development and Progress political party. She later resigned from the party after becoming a minister citing reasons of lack of transparency in the running of her country.

Karimou was one of two people injured in an accident on the Bassila highway on December 14, 2008, when the vehicle in which they were riding lost control after a tire burst. Five people were killed in the accident, among them former ambassador to Canada and government minister Véronique Ahoyo.

Throughout her political career, Rafiatou Karimou has been an advocate for women engaging in politics. During an interview in March 2017, she challenged women to go beyond playing supporting roles. She died on 4 January 2018 in Paris, aged 71.
