= Mounia Meslem =

Algerian politician

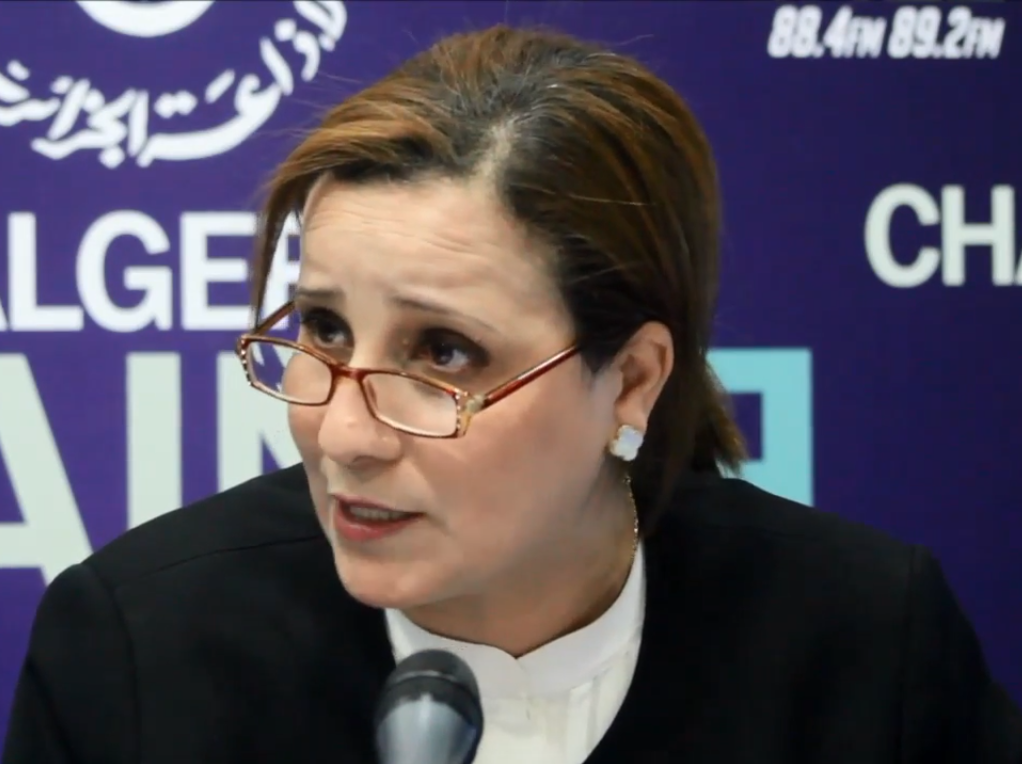
- Meslem in 2015

Minister of National Solidarity, Family and Women's Affairs

Personal details
- Born: June 24, 1961 (age 65)

Mounia Meslem (born in Tébessa on 24 June 1961), is an Algerian politician. Her position was Minister of National Solidarity, the Family and Women Affairs.
