= Regional human rights regimes =

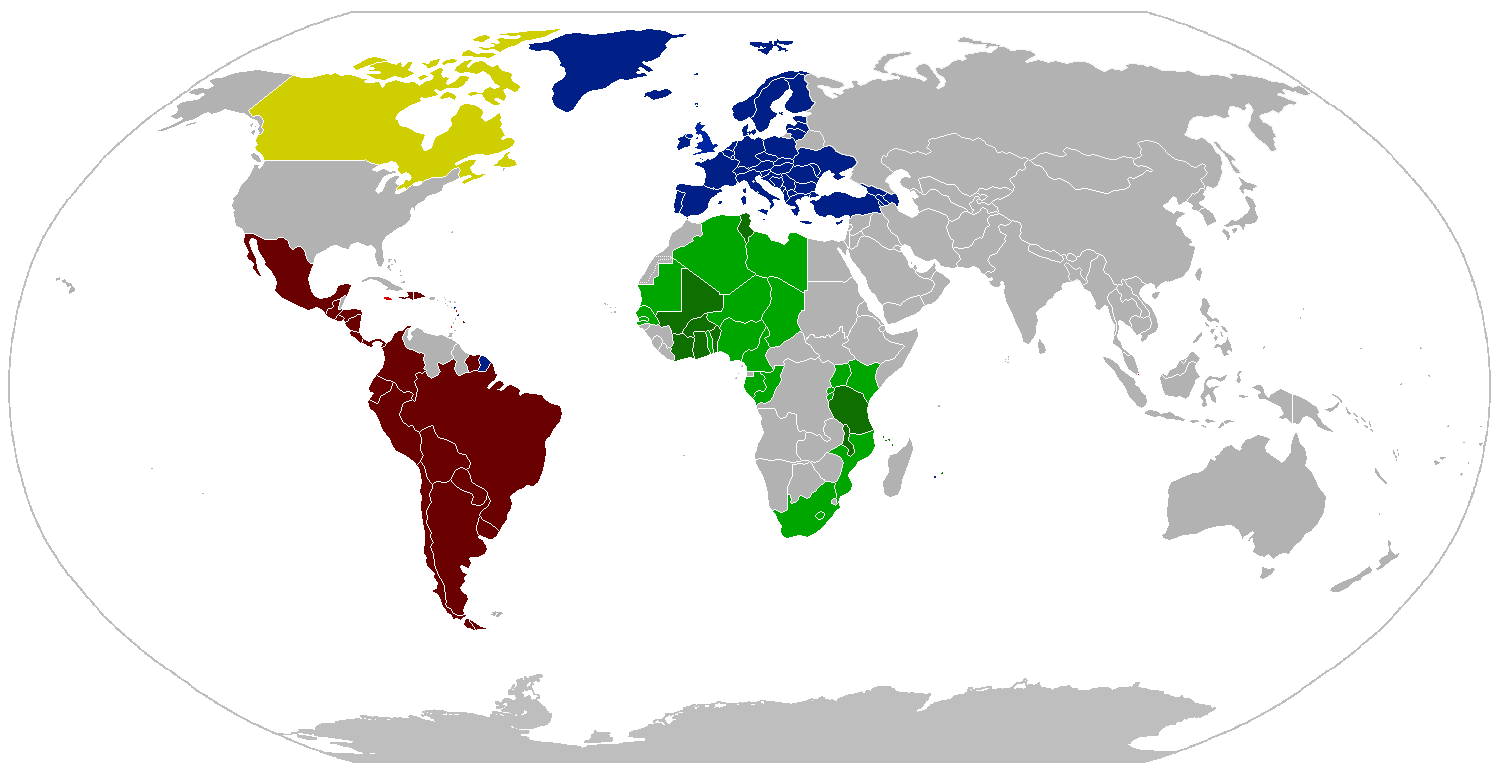
States that recognize regional courts of human rights jurisdiction.

Regional human rights regimes are relatively independently coherent human rights sub-regimes that are nested within the larger frame work of International human rights practice. Three principal regional human rights instruments can be identified, the African Charter on Human and Peoples' Rights, the American Convention on Human Rights (the Americas) and the European Convention on Human Rights.

== Africa ==
The African Union (AU) is a supranational union consisting of fifty-three African states. Established in 2001, the AU's purpose is to help secure Africa's democracy, human rights, and a sustainable economy, especially by bringing an end to intra-African conflict and creating an effective common market.

The African Charter on Human and Peoples' Rights is the region's principal human rights instrument and emerged under the aegis of the Organisation of African Unity (OAU) (since replaced by the African Union). The intention to draw up the African Charter on Human and Peoples' Rights was announced in 1979 and the Charter was unanimously approved at the OAU's 1981 Assembly. Pursuant to its Article 63 (whereby it was to "come into force three months after the reception by the Secretary General of the instruments of ratification or adherence of a simple majority" of the OAU's member states), the African Charter on Human and Peoples' Rights came into effect on October 21, 1986 – in honour of which October 21 was declared "African Human Rights Day."

The African Commission on Human and Peoples' Rights (ACHPR) is a quasi-judicial organ of the African Union tasked with promoting and protecting human rights and collective (peoples') rights throughout the African continent as well as interpreting the African Charter on Human and Peoples' Rights and considering individual complaints of violations of the Charter. The commission has three broad areas of responsibility:

- Promoting human and peoples' rights
- Protecting human and peoples' rights
- Interpreting the African Charter on Human and Peoples' Rights

In pursuit of these goals, the commission is mandated to "collect documents, undertake studies and researches on African problems in the field of human and peoples, rights, organise seminars, symposia and conferences, disseminate information, encourage national and local institutions concerned with human and peoples' rights and, should the case arise, give its views or make recommendations to governments" (Charter, Art. 45).

With the creation of the African Court on Human and Peoples' Rights (under a protocol to the Charter which was adopted in 1998 and entered into force in January 2004), the commission will have the additional task of preparing cases for submission to the Court's jurisdiction. In a July 2004 decision, the AU Assembly resolved that the future Court on Human and Peoples' Rights would be integrated with the African Court of Justice.

The Court of Justice of the African Union is intended to be the "principal judicial organ of the Union" (Protocol of the Court of Justice of the African Union, Article 2.2). Although it has not yet been established, it is intended to take over the duties of the African Commission on Human and Peoples' Rights, as well as act as the supreme court of the African Union, interpreting all necessary laws and treaties. The Protocol establishing the African Court on Human and Peoples' Rights entered into force in January 2004 but its merging with the Court of Justice has delayed its establishment. The Protocol establishing the Court of Justice will come into force when ratified by 15 countries.

== Americas ==
The Organization of American States (OAS) is an international organization, headquartered in Washington, D.C., United States. Its members are the thirty-five independent states of the Americas. Over the course of the 1990s, with the end of the Cold War, the return to democracy in Latin America, and the thrust toward globalization, the OAS made major efforts to reinvent itself to fit the new context. Its stated priorities now include the following:

- Strengthening democracy
- Working for peace
- Protecting human rights
- Combating corruption
- The rights of Indigenous Peoples
- Promoting sustainable development

The Inter-American Commission on Human Rights (the IACHR) is an autonomous organ of the Organization of American States, also based in Washington, D.C. Along with the Inter-American Court of Human Rights, based in San José, Costa Rica, it is one of the bodies that comprise the inter-American system for the promotion and protection of human rights. The IACHR is a permanent body which meets in regular and special sessions several times a year to examine allegations of human rights violations in the hemisphere. Its human rights duties stem from three documents:

- the OAS Charter
- the American Declaration of the Rights and Duties of Man
- the American Convention on Human Rights

The Inter-American Court of Human Rights was established in 1979 with the purpose of enforcing and interpreting the provisions of the American Convention on Human Rights. Its two main functions are thus adjudicatory and advisory. Under the former, it hears and rules on the specific cases of human rights violations referred to it. Under the latter, it issues opinions on matters of legal interpretation brought to its attention by other OAS bodies or member states.

== Asia ==
There are no Asia-wide organisations or conventions to promote or protect human rights. Countries vary widely in their approach to human rights and their record of human rights protection.

The Association of Southeast Asian Nations (ASEAN) is a geo-political and economic organization of 10 countries located in Southeast Asia, formed in 1967 by Indonesia, Malaysia, the Philippines, Singapore and Thailand. The organisation now also includes Brunei, Vietnam, Laos, Myanmar and Cambodia. Its aims include the acceleration of economic growth, social progress, cultural development among its members, and the promotion of regional peace. ASEAN established in 2009–10 an Intergovernmental Commission on Human Rights. In November 2012, ASEAN adopted the ASEAN Human Rights Declaration, but, as of 2015, still has no human rights convention or court.

The Cooperation Council for the Arab States of the Gulf (CCASG) is a trade bloc involving the six Arab states of the Persian Gulf, with many economic and social objectives. Created in 1981, the Council comprises the Persian Gulf states of Bahrain, Kuwait, Oman, Qatar, Saudi Arabia and the United Arab Emirates.

None of the above organisations have a specific mandate to promote or protect human rights, but each has some human rights related economic, social and cultural objectives.

== Europe ==
The Council of Europe, founded in 1949, is the oldest organisation working for European integration. It is an international organisation with legal personality recognised under public international law and has observer status with the United Nations. The seat of the Council of Europe is in Strasbourg, France. The Council of Europe is responsible for both the European Convention on Human Rights and the European Court of Human Rights. These institutions bind the council's members to a code of human rights which, though strict, are more lenient than those of the United Nations charter on human rights. The Council promotes the European Charter for Regional or Minority Languages and the European Social Charter. Membership is open to all European states which seek European integration, accept the principle of the rule of law and are able and willing to guarantee democracy, fundamental human rights and freedoms.

The Council of Europe is separate from the European Union, but the latter is expected to accede to the European Convention and potentially the Council itself. The EU also has a separate human rights document, the Charter of Fundamental Rights of the European Union.

However, unlike its member states, the European Union itself has not yet joined the Convention on Human Rights, as of 2011.

The European Convention on Human Rights has since 1950 defined and guaranteed human rights and fundamental freedoms in Europe. All 47 member states of the Council of Europe have signed the convention and are therefore under the jurisdiction of the European Court of Human Rights in Strasbourg. In order to prevent torture and inhuman or degrading treatment (Article 3 of the convention), the Committee for the Prevention of Torture was established.

The European Court of Human Rights is the only international court with jurisdiction to deal with cases brought by individuals (rather than states). In early 2010 the court had a backlog of over 120,000 cases and a multi-year waiting list. About 1 out of every 20 cases submitted to the court is considered admissible. In 2007 the court issued 1,503 verdicts. At the current rate of proceedings, it would take 46 years for the backlog to clear.

== Oceania ==
There are no regional approaches or agreements on human rights for Oceania, but most countries have a well-regarded human rights record. However, incorporated into the 2005 Pacific Plan, is the commitment to a plan of "defence and promotion of human rights" in the region. The idea of an institutionalized regional human rights framework is ongoing, with an objective to establish an ombudsman and security structures that goes beyond the Pacific Islands Forum.

== See also ==
- National human rights institutions
