= Habeas corpus petitions of Guantanamo Bay detainees =

In United States law, habeas corpus is a recourse challenging the reasons or conditions of a person's detention under color of law. The Guantanamo Bay detention camp is a United States military prison located within Guantanamo Bay Naval Base. A persistent standard of indefinite detention without trial and incidents of torture led the operations of the Guantanamo Bay detention camp to be challenged internationally as an affront to international human rights, and challenged domestically as a violation of the Due Process Clause of the Fifth and Fourteenth amendments of the United States Constitution, including the right of petition for habeas corpus. On 19 February 2002, Guantanamo detainees petitioned in federal court for a writ of habeas corpus to review the legality of their detention.

Numerous cases were tried on this matter, with different outcomes, initially denying the right of petition and later affirming the right of petition. U.S. District Judge Colleen Kollar-Kotelly denied the detainees' petitions on 30 July 2002, finding that aliens in Cuba had no access to U.S. courts. Al Odah v. United States affirmed on 11 March 2003. On 28 June 2004, the Supreme Court decided against the Government in Rasul v. Bush. Justice John Paul Stevens, writing for a five-justice majority, held that the detainees had a statutory right to petition federal courts for habeas review. That same day, the Supreme Court ruled against the Government in Hamdi v. Rumsfeld. Justice Sandra Day O'Connor wrote the four-justice plurality opinion finding that an American citizen detained in Guantanamo had a constitutional right to petition federal courts for habeas review under the Due Process Clause.

In Boumediene v. Bush (2008) it was established Guantanamo detainees have a right to habeas corpus and are able to bring petition to U.S courts. It also held that the Guantanamo detainees were entitled to the legal protections of the US Constitution and from then on, the Combatant Status Review Tribunal would be inadequate. The result of this case has seen many habeas corpus cases refiled. Detainees have had over 200 writs of habeas corpus submitted on their behalf.

The camp was established by U.S. President George W. Bush's administration in 2002 during the war on terror following the September 11, 2001 attacks, operating at a level of secrecy from the outset where even the number of persons held in the camp was difficult to ascertain. The United States Department of Defense (DoD) at first kept secret the identity of the individuals held in Guantanamo, but after losing attempts to defy a Freedom of Information Act request from the Associated Press, the U.S. military officially acknowledged holding 779 prisoners.

The geographical situation of the camp in Cuba permits American personnel from the DoD and the broader intelligence community to operate at the far boundaries of constitutional safeguards with less personal exposure to litigation. Torture conducted by American personnel at Abu Ghraib prison in Iraq during this same timeframe led to eleven military personnel from the 372nd Military Police Company being convicted in 2005 for war crimes. At Guantanamo Bay, the military administration has consistently prioritized national security over conflicting interests of due process, while slow-pedaling even the most basic disclosures. Many detainees were held for extreme durations without charge, spanning multiple presidential administrations, even while their rights to habeas corpus remained under protracted litigation.

== The Great Writ ==
Habeas corpus is sometimes called "The Great Writ". It is a legal instrument first guaranteed following the signing of the Magna Carta. Its literal meaning is "show the body". Its purpose is to prevent the state from holding prisoners in extrajudicial detention. A writ of habeas corpus essentially challenges the legality of the detention. When a writ of habeas corpus is filed with a court in countries which inherit elements of their judicial system from the English system of Justice the state has to show that there is a legal basis for the captive's detention—usually that they are suspected of having broken a law. The principle of habeas corpus is codified in many humanitarian law treaties and national legislation—the right of fair trial is considered a basic human right as is access to courts by incarcerated persons. The principle of habeas corpus is codified in the US Constitution in article I(9)(2), commonly known as the 'Suspension Clause'. This provides that "the privilege of the Writ of Habeas Corpus shall not be suspended, unless when in Cases of Rebellion or Invasion the public Safety may require it".

== Guantanamo detainee eligibility for the protections of habeas corpus ==
Reports from Guantanamo Bay claim the detainees suffer from "extraordinary psychological and physical abuses". Psychological abuses include solitary confinement for long periods, sleep deprivation and religious abuse. Physical abuse is also used regularly as punishment, reportedly disproportionate for the apparent misconduct. Sami Al-Laithi, a professor at Kabul University who was taken into US custody in Guantanamo has been found to never have been hostile towards US. He was a healthy man when he was first captured by US forces but is now unable to walk after two vertebrae were broken in vicious beatings in the camp. Many of these detainees claim that they have been wrongfully detained and deny any involvement in hostile activity towards the US, or any involvement with the Taliban or Al Qaeda at all. Taking into account the inhumane conditions of the camp it is not surprising that Guantanamo detainees have sought protection from the principles of habeas corpus.

The issue is concerned with the jurisdiction of the US Courts to issue the writ of habeas corpus with respect to the detention of aliens who are held outside of the US. Six weeks after the events of September 11 Bush granted the US Patriot Act which restricted the right of habeas corpus to resident aliens, this was done to allow suspected terrorists to be held without legal counsel or trial and avoid the protection of habeas corpus. The third Geneva Convention considers a fair trial so essential to prisoner rights that "willfully depriving a prisoner of war of the rights of a fair and regular trial is deemed a grave breach of the convention and, consequentially, a war crime".

In early 2002 the first major petition for a writ of habeas corpus regarding Guantanamo detainees was filed. This was denied on the foundation that U.S. courts lacked jurisdiction over the camp and its prisoners; Guantanamo Bay is located in Cuba, outside of the territory of the US, and the writ of habeas corpus is "not available to aliens outside the sovereign territory of the USA". The lease of Guantanamo Bay to the US on the part of Cuba reads "while on one hand the US recognises the continuance of the ultimate sovereignty of the Republic of Cuba. ... on the other hand the Republic of Cuba consents that ... the USA shall exercise complete jurisdiction and control over and within said area". Early courts claimed that Guantanamo does not technically belong to the United States so habeas corpus could not apply. The Combatant Status Review Tribunals (CSRT) was created as an outcome of early petitions for habeas corpus. Its role was to establish whether or not detainees are actually enemy combatants.

However, the most recent case law development has been in the U.S. Supreme Court case Boumediene v. Bush where it was established Guantanamo detainees have a right to habeas corpus and are able to bring their petitions to U.S courts. It also held that the Guantanamo detainees were entitled to the legal protections of the US Constitution and from then on, the Combatant Status Review Tribunal would be inadequate. The result of this case has seen many habeas corpus cases refiled.

== Abuses of international human rights law and habeas corpus ==
The Geneva Conventions, of which there are four, are considered universal treaties in international law. They created the idea of International humanitarian law and codify customary international law regarding laws in wartime. By signing parties agreed to criminalise any breaches in their own domestic courts, U.S. recognised this when they enacted their own War Crimes Act. However the declaration made by Bush in 2002 had the effect of "exempting all alleged members of Al Qaeda from the protections of the Geneva conventions".

The abuse of international human rights law lies in the treatment of detainees, the absence of public scrutiny, judicial review and government accountability. The U.S. government deliberately chose Guantanamo Bay as the site for detaining foreign citizens as they believed it would be exempt from any obligations they held under the Geneva Convention. Considering detainees as detainees outside the traditional definition of prisoners also denies the protections of the Geneva Convention. Proof of these deliberate decisions is found in the legal memoranda where President Bush actively enquired about how far they could legally go.

The scope of international human rights has been discussed in the habeas corpus cases from Guantanamo Bay. Firstly, habeas corpus is a human right of utmost importance, recognised through humanitarian law, for "protecting one's right to physical liberty". It has been suggested that there may almost be universal acceptance that the protections of habeas corpus are 'non-derogable'.

Habeas corpus exists outside the Geneva Convention; it is found in the Universal Declaration of Human Rights in Article 9; Article 9 of the International Covenant on Civil and Political Rights; Article 5 of the European Convention of Human Rights; and, in the American Convention on Human Rights, Article 7. The purpose of the European Convention on Human Rights is to create enforceable rights that States are obliged to respect. Limiting this Convention in order to conduct security operations would undermine the system.

== Role of the Center for Constitutional Rights ==
The Center for Constitutional Rights took a lead role in helping to organize the activities of lawyers willing to offer their services, pro bono, to the Guantanamo detainees.

Submitting writs of habeas corpus was made more difficult at first, because part of the Bush detainee policy was to keep the identity of the Guantanamo captives a secret. A writ has to be submitted by a "next friend". Some of the detainees had family who would have authorized American lawyers to submit writs on their behalf, but they had no way of contacting them. Some of the detainees and their relatives are totally illiterate. Other detainees' families had no idea where they were, and had no idea that they were in Guantanamo. Some of the detainees reported that they were punished for asking for legal assistance.

== Rasul v. Bush ==
In the summer of 2004 the United States Supreme Court ruled on the habeas corpus submission Rasul v. Bush, determining that the court had jurisdiction over Guantanamo, and that detainees had a right to an impartial tribunal to challenge their detention under habeas corpus. It was a landmark decision in detainee rights. Rasul v Bush challenged an earlier precedent set in Johnson v. Eisentrager. Rasul concluded that the U.S., as a lessee, has "extensive proprietary rights over Guantanamo Bay' that were exclusively granted in the 1903 lease. This lease gave U.S operational sovereignty over the base and brought it within the Supreme Court's jurisdiction. A related decision was Hamdi v. Rumsfeld (2004), which ruled that United States citizens detained as suspected enemy combatants had the right to habeas corpus challenge of their detention.

== Detainee Treatment Act of 2005 ==
In response to Rasul v Bush, the U.S. government passed the Detainee Treatment Act 2005 in an attempt to prevent aliens from petitioning for habeas corpus in American courts. Section 1005(e) states that "[N]o court, justice, or Judge shall have jurisdiction to hear or consider an application for a writ of habeas corpus filed by or on behalf of an alien detained at the Department of Defense at Guantanamo Bay, Cuba'.

The Detainee Treatment Act of 2005 prohibited US military and intelligence personnel from treating detainees in ways inconsistent with Armed Forces regulations. Additionally, the act did not close off the habeas corpus submissions that were already in the works.

== Hamdan v. Rumsfeld ==
In Hamdan v. Rumsfeld (2006), the Supreme Court ruled that the Bush Presidency lacked the Constitutional authority to create the Guantanamo military commissions as a system separate from the existing federal and military justice systems, and ruled that the CSRTs and military commissions were unconstitutional. It said that only Congress could authorize such a system. They confirmed in their judgement the unlawfulness of the US Government in the use of torture, cruel and humiliating treatment, and international law should limit the power of the President.

Hamdam v Rumsfeld has been acknowledged as a milestone case for Guantanamo detainees; Walter Dellinger even claimed that "Hamdam is simply the most important decision on Presidential power and the rule of law. Ever". It followed the passing of the Detainee Treatment Act and gave the Supreme Court an "early opportunity to assess the nature and extent of the jurisdiction-stripping measure". The Supreme Court held that the amendment by the new legislation would not apply to detainees who had cases already waiting to be reviewed.

== Military Commissions Act of 2006 ==
Once more in response to a judicial decision, Congress passed the Military Commission Act of 2006 swiftly after Hamdan v Rumsfeld. The new section, under section 7, attempted to apply the Detainee Treatment Act to detainees with cases pending. This was an attempt by the political branch of government to reinforce their opinion that the "federal courts should have as little to do with Guantanamo Bay detainees as possible".

== The Supreme Court and the Military Commissions Act ==
On June 29, 2007, the Supreme Court agreed to hear outstanding habeas corpus, opening up the possibility that they might overturn some or all of the Military Commissions Act.

== The Supreme Court rules on Boumediene v. Bush ==
On June 12, 2008, the United States Supreme Court ruled, in Boumediene v. Bush, that the Guantanamo detainees were entitled to the protection of the United States Constitution. Justice Anthony Kennedy, writing for the majority, described the CSR Tribunals as "inadequate", and wrote:

The laws and Constitution are designed to survive, and remain in force, in extraordinary times.

== Lists of habeas petitions filed on behalf of detainees ==
More than 200 detainees have had habeas petitions filed on their behalf.

== The proposed Habeas Corpus Restoration Act of 2007 ==
Senators Patrick Leahy and Arlen Specter have proposed Habeas Corpus Restoration Act of 2007, to restore access to habeas corpus to the Guantanamo detainees. Debate began on the bill on September 17, 2007. It has been attached, as an amendment, to a Defense bill.

== Boumediene v. Bush ==
The decision in Boumediene v. Bush in 2008 has had huge implications for America's war on terror. It was acknowledged that the Military Commissions Act was retaliation to the decision in Hamdan. Boumediene ruled that Guantanamo detainees were able to bring about a petition for a writ of habeas corpus in U.S courts and established that the judicial branch of government has the final say on unlawful detentions, rather than the Executive branch as the Bush administration had been implementing.

Justice Kennedy, in delivering the majority opinion, held that it was within the U.S. court's jurisdiction to apply a writ of habeas corpus to aliens in Guantanamo Bay as the fundamental rights of the U.S. Constitution should be extended to Guantanamo detainees. Since Boumediene, Bush confirmed that his administration would look into the decision to see if any additional legislation would be 'appropriate' in terms of the protection of American people.

== See also ==
- Declaration of Principles on Equality
- Global Rights
- Human rights
- International law
- International humanitarian law
- International human rights instruments
- Legal certainty
- Natural law
- Natural and legal rights
- Refugee law
- Rule of law
- Rule According to Higher Law
- Substantive equality
