= Committee for the Prevention of Torture in Africa =

The Committee for the Prevention of Torture in Africa (CPTA), known as the Robben Island Guidelines Monitoring Committee from its foundation in 2002 until 2009, is an organization established by the African Commission on Human and Peoples' Rights to promote the use of the Robben Island Guidelines and prevent torture in Africa.
