= Marie Thérèse Mukamulisa =

Rwandan jurist

Marie‑Thérèse Mukamulisa
- Born: June 29, 1965 (age 60); Kigali, Rwanda
- Occupation: Judge
- Known for: Judge at the African Court on Human and Peoples' Rights

Marie Thérèse Mukamulisa (born 29 June 1965) is a Rwandan jurist who was appointed to a six-year term on the African Court on Human and Peoples' Rights in 2016.

== Early life and education ==
Mukamulisa was born in Kigali on 29 June 1965. She has a degree in civil law from the University of Rwanda (1990) and a master's degree in common law from the University of Moncton in New Brunswick, Canada (1993). She has a Masters in Genocide Studies and Prevention from the Center for Conflict Management at the University of Rwanda.

== Career ==
Mukamulisa was an accountant and cashier at the Project of Agricultural Investigation and Statistics. Director Car Insurance at Sonarwa and Executive Secretary of the NGO umbrella organization CCOAIB. Mukamulisa was one of twelve commissioners who drafted the Rwanda post-genocide Constitution, and has been a lecturer in Comparative Law at the University of Rwanda.

Mukamulisa was appointed as a judge of the Supreme Court of Rwanda in 2003. She has spoken about the difficulties women face within the judicial system, particularly with child abuse and rape cases, due to cultural and gender factors. In 2015, she became a member of the High Judicial Council of Rwanda. She is also a member of the International Hague Network of Judges.

Mukamulisa was elected to a six-year term on the African Court on Human and People's Rights alongside Ntyam Mengue in July 2016. Her appointment has since been criticised due to Rwanda's decision to withdraw from allowing individuals and NGOs to appeal directly to the court, and to Mukamulisa's involvement on the panel of judges who sentenced opposition politician Victoire Ingabire Umuhoza, who appealed to the African Court.

== Personal life ==
Mukamulisa is married and has two sons.
