= Judges of the African Court on Human and Peoples' Rights =

The first Judges of the African Court on Human and Peoples' Rights were elected on January 22, 2006 at the Eighth Ordinary Session of the Executive Council of the African Union, held in Khartoum, Sudan. The judges, hailing from 11 of the 53 member states of the African Union, are from varying backgrounds of judicial experience and knowledge of international and human rights law.

Each judge serves for a six-year term, and can be re-elected once. The President and Vice-President are elected to two-year terms and can only be re-elected once.

- (Republic of the Congo) Blaise Tchikaya (President)
- (Algeria) Chafika Bensaoula (Vice-President)
- (Tunisia) Rafaâ Ben Achour
- (Cameroon) Ntyam Ondo Mengue
- (Malawi) Tujilane Rose Chizumila
- (Nigeria) Stella Anukam
- (Tanzania) Imani Daud Aboud
- (South Africa) Dumisa Ntsebeza
- (Mali) Modibo Sacko
- (Ghana) Dennis Dominic Adjei
- (Uganda) Duncan Gaswaga
