= Mutsinzi =

Mutsinzi is a surname. Notable people with the surname include:

- Ange Mutsinzi (born 1997), Rwandan footballer
- Jean Mutsinzi (1938–2019), Rwandan jurist
