= United Nations Security Council Resolution 1350 =

UN Security Council Resolution 1350
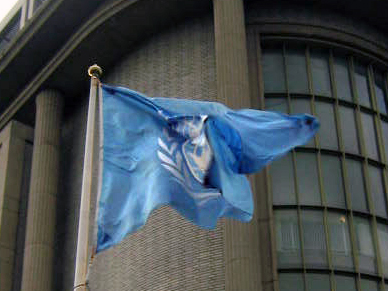
- Flag of the ICTY
- Date: 27 April 2001
- Meeting no.: 4,316
- Code: S/RES/1350 (Document)
- Subject: The International Criminal Tribunal for the former Yugoslavia
- Voting summary: 15 voted for; None voted against; None abstained
- Result: Adopted

Security Council composition
- Permanent members: China; France; Russia; United Kingdom; United States
- Non-permanent members: Bangladesh; Colombia; Ireland; Jamaica; Mali; Mauritius; Norway; Singapore; Tunisia; Ukraine

United Nations Security Council resolution 1350, adopted unanimously on 27 April 2001, after recalling resolutions 808 (1993), 827 (1993), 1166 (1998) and 1329 (2000), the Council forwarded a list of nominees for permanent judges at the International Criminal Tribunal for the former Yugoslavia (ICTY) to the General Assembly for consideration.

The list of 64 nominees proposed by the Secretary-General Kofi Annan was as follows:

- Aydin Sefa Akay (Turkey)
- Carmen María Argibay (Argentina)
- Lucy Asuagbor (Cameroon)
- Jeremy Badgery-Parker (Australia)
- Chifumu Kingdom Banda (Zambia)
- Roberto Bellelli (Italy)
- Pierre G. Boutet (Canada)
- Hans Henrik Brydensholt (Denmark)
- Guibril Camara (Senegal)
- Joaquin Martin Canivell (Spain)
- Romeo T. Capulong (Philippines)
- Oscar Ceville (Panama)
- Isaac Chibulu Tantameni Chali (Zambia)
- Arthur Chaskalson (South Africa)
- Maureen Harding Clark (Ireland)
- Fatoumata Diarra (Mali)
- Cenk Alp Durak (Turkey)
- Moise Ebongue (Cameroon)
- Mathew Epuli (Cameroon)
- Albin Eser (Germany)
- Mohamed Al Habib Fassi Fihri (Morocco)
- John Foster Gallop (Australia)
- Joseph Nassif Ghamroun (Lebanon)
- Michael Grotz (Germany)
- Adbullah Mahamane Haidara (Mali)
- Claude Hanoteau (France)
- Hassan Bubacar Jallow (Gambia)
- Ivana Janů (Czech Republic)
- Aykut Kılıç (Turkey)
- Flavia Lattanzi (Italy)
- Per-Johan Lindholm (Finland)
- Augustin P. Lobejón (Spain)
- Diadié Issa Maiga (Mali)
- Irene Chirwa Mambilima (Zambia)
- Dick F. Marty (Switzerland)
- Jane Hamilton Mathews (Australia)
- Suzanne Mengue Zomo (Cameroon)
- Ghulam Mujaddid Mirza (Pakistan)
- Ahmad Aref Moallem (Lebanon)
- Mphanza Patrick Mvunga (Zambia)
- Rafael Nieto Navia (Colombia)
- Léopold Ntahompagaze (Burundi)
- André Ntahomvukiye (Burundi)
- Cesar Pereira Burgos (Panama)
- Mauro Politi (Italy)
- Vonimbolana Rasoazanany (Madagascar)
- Ralph Riachy (Lebanon)
- Ingo Risch (Germany)
- Robert Roth (Switzerland)
- Zacharie Rwamaza (Burundi)
- Sourahata Babouccar Semega-Janneh (Gambia)
- Tom Farquhar Shepherdson (Australia)
- Amarjeet Singh (Singapore)
- Ayla Songor (Turkey)
- Albertus Henricus Joannes Swart (Netherlands)
- György Szénási (Hungary)
- Ahmad Takkieddine (Lebanon)
- Chikako Taya (Japan)
- Krister Thelin (Sweden)
- Stefan Trechsel (Switzerland)
- Christine Van Den Wyngaert (Belgium)
- Volodymyr Vassylenko (Ukraine)
- Lal Chand Vohrah (Malaysia)
- Sharon A. Williams (Canada)

27 judges were subsequently elected in June 2001 at a meeting of the General Assembly to serve a term from 12 June 2001 to 11 June 2005.

== See also ==
- List of United Nations Security Council Resolutions 1301 to 1400 (2000–2002)
- Yugoslav Wars
- List of United Nations Security Council Resolutions related to the conflicts in former Yugoslavia
