= Jean Emile Somda =

Burkinabe judge

Jean Emile Somda was a judge from Burkina Faso who served on the African Court on Human and Peoples' Rights from 2006-2008.

At the time of his appointment, he was on the Constitutional Council of Burkina Faso, which is the constitutional court of the country. Other positions he has held include: Legal advisor to the Minister of Justice, Advisor to the Constitutional Council, Minister for Public Service and Institutional Development, Judge-Constitutional Court, President,-Tribunal of Kaya, President of the Chamber of the Court of Appeals of Ouaga, and Member of Independent Commission of Inquiry into the case of Norbert Zongo.

Somda attended Cheikh Anta Diop University in Dakar, Senegal and received a Master's in Law degree in 1981.
