= Tujilane Chizumila =

Malawian lawyer and jurist

Tujilane Rose Chizumila (born 14 May 1953) is a Malawian lawyer and jurist. She was Malawi's first female ombudsman, serving from 2010 until 2015. She was appointed to the African Court on Human and Peoples' Rights for a six-year term in 2017.

== Early life and education ==
Chizumila was born on 14 May 1953 in Zomba, Malawi. Her father, George Michongwe, was a senior civil servant who was assigned to the Malawi Delegation at the United Nations in New York in 1964. After the 1964 Malawi cabinet crisis, the family fled into exile in 1966, settling as refugees in Tanzania. She has a bachelor's degree in law from the University of Dar es Salaam, and a master's degree in International Law, obtained in Germany.

== Career ==
Chizumila and her two sons returned to Malawi in 1988, where she worked for Save the Children for eighteen months while waiting for a security clearance because she was the child of a "rebel." She was then directed by Hastings Banda to report to the Minister of Justice as a State Advocate. She was later the first woman to establish a law firm in Malawi.

In 2000, Chizumila was appointed as Malawi's High Commissioner to Zimbabwe. She was appointed as a judge of the High Court of Malawi in 2003 by President Bakili Muluzi. Her publication, "A widow's perspective - a personal experience" led to the enactment of a law making property grabbing an offence in Malawi.

Chizumila was Malawi's first female ombudsman, serving from 2010 until 2015. In 2012, she was accused of nepotism and was later arrested and interrogated in Lilongwe on suspicion of abuse of her office. She refused to resign when no evidence could be produced against her. In April 2013, five armed men raided her house in Lilongwe, stealing property and threatening her and her children.

Chizumila was elected to the African Court at the African Union meeting in Addis Ababa in January 2017, alongside Algerian Chafika Bensaoula. The two were sworn in on 6 March, bringing the number of women on the court to five of eleven judges for the first time and fulfilling the gender parity requirement of the Protocol establishing the court.

== Publications ==
- Chanda, Cosmas; Chizumila, Tujilane (30 November 1992). "Promotion of Refugee Women Participation in Leadership Roles and the Management of Relief Items in Nyamithuthu Refugee Settlement" (Document). Lilongwe: UNHCR.
- Chizumila, Tujilane. "A widow's perspective - A personal experience" – via African Women in Law. "Justice Chizumila is also a scholar who released the publication "A widow's perspective- A personal experience", which helped enact a law that made property grabbing illegal."
- Chizumila, Tujilane (2012). "Rule of Law in Malawi: The Road to Recovery" (Document). International Bar Association.

== Personal life ==
Chizumila married in Tanzania and has two sons and a daughter. She divorced her husband for infidelity. In Malawi, she married Collins Chizumila, a pro-democracy advocate and founding member of the United Democratic Front who had served as Malawian Minister of Justice and Attorney General, in 1992. He died in 1996 and within three weeks she lost all property including her house which was sold by her stepson. Chizumila speaks English, German, Chichewa, English and Swahili.
