= Special Rapporteur on Women's Rights in Africa =

ACHPR official

The Special Rapporteur on Women's Rights in Africa (SRRWA) is an official of the African Commission on Human and Peoples' Rights (ACHPR) charged with reinforcing and promoting women's rights in the countries of the African Union. The Rapporteur also bears specific responsibilities with respect to the Protocol on the Rights of Women in Africa, better known as the Maputo Protocol.

The role was created by the ACHPR through resolution ACHPR/res.38 (XXV) 99 at the 25th Ordinary Session of the ACHPR at Bujumbura, Burundi, between 26 April and 5 May 1999.

== Rapporteurs ==
- Commissioner Julienne Ondziel Gnelenga, served from 1998 to 2001, retired when her time with the Commission ended.
- Commissioner Angela Melo, October 2001 – November 2007
- Maître Soyata Maïga, November 2007 –
