= Jean Mutsinzi =

Rwandan jurist (1938–2019)

Jean Mutsinzi (5 April 1938 – 21 November 2019) was a Rwandan jurist in the African Court on Human and Peoples' Rights. He was elected for a six-year term of office on 22 January 2006 at the Eighth Ordinary Session of the Executive Council of the African Union, held in Khartoum, Sudan.

Mutsinzi was nominated in September 2008, as President of the African Court for a first term of two years.

Mutsinzi died on 21 November 2019, at the age of 81.

== Overview ==
- Position at Time of Election: Justice of the Supreme Court of Rwanda since 2003.

=== Other positions held ===
- Member, Council of the Wise, Rwanda Association of Jurists
- Senior Lecturer in Private and Public International law, Kigali Independent University, in Rwanda (2001–2003)
- Executive Secretary, Legal and Constitutional Commission of the Republic of Rwanda (2000–2003). The Constitution of 4 June 2003 of the Republic of Rwanda was approved by Rwandan citizens in the Referendum of 26 May 2003.
- Judge at the COMESA Court of Justice (Common Market for Eastern and Southern Africa) (2001–2003)
- President of the Superior Council of the Judiciary (1995–1999)
- Chief Justice of the Supreme Court of the Republic of Rwanda (1995–1999)
- Secretary of the African Commission on Human and Peoples' Rights (1989–1994)
- Chief Legal Adviser, Organization of African Unity (1982–1995)
- Lawyer, president of the Lubumbashi Bar Association, Zaïre (1966–1982)
- Lecturer in Public and Private International Law, International Organizations, Maritime and Aviation Law at the National University of Zaire, Faculty of Social, Political and Economic Sciences (1966–1982)
- Director of Research at the Université libre de Bruxelles, in Belgium (1964–1966)
- PhD in Private and Public International law, International Organizations, Maritime and Aviation Law at the Université libre de Bruxelles, in Belgium (1964)

== Report ==
- 1 December 2007 – 30 April 2009: Chairman of the Committee of Independent Experts established via prime ministerial decree no. 07/3 16 April 2007 to investigate the circumstances of the crash of the Dassault Falcon 50 aircraft, registration number 9XR-NN on 6 April 1994 which was carrying former President Juvénal Habyarimana and his counterpart, President Cyprien Ntaryamira of Burundi. The death of former President Habyarimana holds tremendous historical significance since it kicked off a long-planned genocide that claimed the lives of close to a million Tutsis in one hundred days.
- On 11 January 2010, the Rwandan Committee of Independent Experts published their findings on the crash of a Dassault Falcon 50 on 6 April 1994 that killed former President Habyarimana of Rwanda and President Ntaryamira of Burundi.
- It was concluded that the aircraft crashed after being hit by at least one missile. The missiles were fired by the Anti-Aircraft Battalion located near the Kigali Airport. The conclusion of the report states that the assassination was the work of Hutu extremists (akazu) who calculated that killing their own leader would torpedo a power-sharing agreement known as the Arusha Accords. (The Mutsinzi Report Report of the Investigation into the Causes and Circumstances of and Responsibility for the Attack of 6 April 1994 Against The Falcon 50 Rwandan Presidential Aeroplane Registration Number 9XR-NN).

=== Key elements ===
- This key conclusion by the Committee is based on a large number of eyewitnesses, its members heard 557 witnesses, including former members of the Rwandan army and Presidential Guard under Habyarimana, employees of the adjacent airport where the plane was to land, and members of the Belgian peacekeeping contingent of UNAMIR who were within the crash zone and either witnessed the attack, or its immediate aftermath. The Committee perused post-genocide reports by Belgium, France and the United Nations. The inquiry also relied on testimonies extracted by French judicial authorities from indicted masterminds of the genocide, now in detention at the International Criminal Tribunal for Rwanda in Arusha, Tanzania.
- Perhaps most significantly, it's also the conclusion of the ballistics report prepared for the committee by Mike Warden and Alan McClue of the Department of Applied Science, Security and Resilience, Cranfield University, Defence Academy of the United Kingdom that the missiles (that shot down the plane carrying Rwandan President Juvenal Habyarimana on 6 April 1994) could only have been fired from an area near the Kanombe military camp, the President's home, and the main Kigali international airport, and this entire area was completely controlled by the Rwandan army.
