= Declaration of Principles on Equality =

The Declaration of Principles on Equality reflects a moral and professional consensus among human rights and equality experts done in December 2008. It contains 27 principles that establish a new paradigm on equality, drawing on established and emerging principles of international law. It has been described by the High Court of Delhi as reflecting the ‘current international understanding of Principles on Equality.’

== Background ==
The need to formulate general legal principles on equality was defined on the basis of (i) acknowledging the pervasiveness of discrimination and the weaknesses in the protection of the right to equality at both international and national levels, (ii) the absence of comprehensive equality legislation in many countries around the world and the recognition that such legislation is necessary to give effect to states’ obligations under international and regional human rights law; (iii) the disparities and inconsistencies in approaches to discrimination and equality in the different frameworks of the UN, EU, the Council of Europe, various national jurisdictions, etc. which meant that virtually none of the key concepts of equality law had universally accepted definitions; (iv) the fragmentation of the anti-discrimination struggle, whereby different status/identity groups are enmeshed in identity politics and are unable to follow a universal human rights approach to equality and develop solidarity with other disadvantaged groups.

The Principles on Equality were agreed by a group of experts in several stages of consultations. They were discussed at a conference entitled ‘Principles on Equality and the Development of Legal Standards on Equality’ organised by The Equal Rights Trust (ERT) on 3–5 April 2008 in London. Participants of different backgrounds, including academics, legal practitioners and human rights activists from all regions of the world took part in this event. Participants debated a version of the draft that had incorporated their comments on an earlier document. They subsequently contributed comments. A number of further experts participated in various stages of drafting and deliberation.

ERT launched the Declaration of Principles on Equality on 21 October 2008, in London. The document was signed initially by 128 experts from 44 countries, and subsequently by hundreds of others. It establishes, for the first time, general legal principles on equality as a basic human right. The Declaration contains 27 principles on which national equality legislation and policies should be based. The principles formulated and agreed by the experts through a two-year-long consultative process are based on concepts and jurisprudence developed in international, regional and national legal contexts. The Declaration is intended to assist efforts of legislators, the judiciary, civil society organisations and anyone else involved in combating discrimination and promoting equality, in particular through developing effective equality legislation and policies.

The legal basis of the 27 Principles is found (i) in the Charter of the United Nations which recognises the inherent dignity and worth and the equal and inalienable rights of all members of the human family as the foundation of freedom, justice and peace in the world; (ii) Article 1 of the Universal Declaration of Human Rights proclaiming that all human beings are born free and equal in dignity and rights; and common Article 2 of the International Covenant on Civil and Political Rights and the International Covenant on Economic, Social and Cultural Rights; (iii) the recognition, in Article 26 of the International Covenant on Civil and Political Rights, of the right to non-discrimination as an autonomous human right and the correlative obligation of States to realise this right; (iv) a number of provisions in international and regional treaties; (v) non-binding opinions, recommendations, and interpretations by organs of international and regional organisation including the Council of Europe; (vi) jurisprudence of international, regional and national courts related to equality.

== Principles ==
Marking a transition from identity politics to a unitary human rights framework on equality, the Declaration provides guidance on some of the most complex and controversial issues that arise in any attempt to develop comprehensive equality legislation at the national level. For example, it defines the right to equality, equal treatment, and the right to non-discrimination, and gives a legal definition of discrimination, as well as of the most important types of discrimination (direct, indirect, harassment, discrimination by association and by perception); through these, it provides guidance on the question of how the right to non-discrimination relates to the right to equality. The Declaration also provides general principles on how to approach the question of the grounds on which discrimination must be prohibited: should the right to non-discrimination apply only to a closed list of grounds? Are new grounds emerging that should require equal protection? Is there a hierarchy of the ground of discrimination, and what should be the approach to defining exceptions?

Having taken account of the existing notions of affirmative action, positive action, special measures and positive measures in various legal frameworks, the Declaration further formulates principles on which to base the law on positive action and positive duties. Positive action does not constitute discrimination as long as the difference in treatment is aimed at achieving full and effective equality and the means adopted are proportionate to that aim. Positive ac¬tion measures are not defined as an exception to the principle of equal treatment but as part of its implementation. States have a positive duty to promote equality.

The definition of the right to non-discrimination in Principle 4 as a free-standing right is meant in two senses: (i) in the sense that it is a separate right, which can be violated even if a related right is not: for example, a person’s right to non-discrimination in the enjoyment of the right to education may be violated, while no breach of her right to education has been found; this understanding is well established in the jurisprudence of the European Court of Human rights; (ii) in the sense of an autonomous right, not related to any other right set forth by law. In this second sense, the free-standing status of the right to non-discrimination means that this right does not depend on whether another legal right actually exists. This is the approach followed in defining discrimination in the European Union equality Directives, as well as in the national legislation of a number of the EU member states.

The Declaration further contains principles on equality related to: the relationship between discrimination and violence; the scope of application of the right to equality (“all areas of activity regulated by law”); the personal scope: who are the right-holders, e.g. whether legal persons can claim the right as well as individuals and groups; the definition of duty-bearers; the content of the duty to give effect to the right to equality; the obligations regarding multiple discrimination; the duty of accommodating difference (defining the concept of reasonable accommodation); the relationship between the right to equality and poverty; the specificity of equality legislation; the duty to ensure participation in developing law and policies implementing the right to equality; and the duty to provide education related to equality.

Another set of principles are related to enforcement of the right to equality and define access to justice in equality law; victimisation; standing rules; evidence and proof in adjudicating equality rights; remedies and sanctions; the role of specialised bodies; and the duty to gather and disseminate information including statistics as part of the enforcement of the right to equality. Finally, the Declaration contains principles prohibiting regressive interpretation and derogations from the right to equality.

== Limitations ==
The Declaration of Principles on Equality, as its title indicates, provides only the most general and abstract synthesis of legal standards on equality. Those who would be looking for more detailed guidance on specific issues would be disappointed. But the Declaration’s significance consists in the fact that it documents a degree of moral and professional consensus among global experts at the most fundamental level, reflecting both basic values shared by the signatories and a negotiated agreement on exactly how to express these values in the form and the language of universal legal principles. As an established common ground, the Declaration can therefore serve as the basis for further elaboration of specific legal standards related to equality issues.

== Recent developments ==
On 25 November 2011, the Standing Committee of the Parliamentary Assembly of the Council of Europe (PACE) adopted a Resolution and a Recommendation on “The Declaration of Principles on Equality and the Activities of the Council of Europe” at its meeting in Edinburgh, UK, welcoming and endorsing the Declaration.

The Resolution, for the adoption of which a simple majority was necessary, and the Recommendation, which required a qualified majority of two thirds, were voted on during the session of the Standing Committee under the UK Chairmanship of the Council of Europe in Edinburgh. The Standing Committee acts on behalf of PACE when the latter is not in session, and its Resolutions and Recommendations have identical legal status with those of the full assembly.

In the Resolution, the Parliamentary Assembly welcomes the Declaration of Principles on Equality and “calls on member states to take into account the principles contained in the Declaration when adopting equality and non-discrimination legislation and policies”.

In the Recommendation, which is addressed to the Committee of Ministers, the highest executive authority of the Council of Europe:

“1. Referring to its Resolution on the Declaration of Principles on Equality and activities of the Council of Europe, the Parliamentary Assembly recommends that the Committee of Ministers:

1.1. enhance efforts aimed at speeding up ratification of Protocol No. 12 to the European Convention on Human Rights (ETS No. 5) by the members states which have not yet done so;

1.2. disseminate information on good practices in the implementation of policies aimed at combating discrimination and inequalities;

1.3. ensure that the Declaration is taken into account in the work of the different Council of Europe bodies and expert groups dealing with the issues of equality and non-discrimination;

1.4. promote the Declaration in its dealings with external actors, and in particular with policymakers from the Council of Europe member states;

2. Moreover, recalling the necessity of harmonising the interpretation and implementation of the rights to equality and non-discrimination, the Assembly recommends that the Committee of Ministers:

2.1. step up co-operation with the European Union on the consolidation of standards in the area of non-discrimination and promotion of equality;

2.2. pursue co-operation with other international organisations, in particular the Organization for Security and Co-operation in Europe (OSCE), the United Nations and its Committee on the Elimination of Racial Discrimination, with a view to achieving coherent interpretations of the principles of equality and non-discrimination and the implementation of common policies in the field of combating discrimination and inequalities.”

The Resolution and Recommendation were proposed by the Committee on Legal Affairs and Human Rights (CLAHR), whose member Boriss Cilevics (Latvia) was the Rapporteur on the matter. The position of the CLAHR, which was adopted in June 2011 in Oslo, was preceded by a hearing held in Paris on 8 March 2011, at which The Equal Rights Trust provided testimony. The Recommendation will now progress to the Committee of Ministers which should consider a response.

== See also ==
- Bob Hepple
- International human rights law
- International human rights instruments
