= African Court of Justice and Human Rights =

Prospective international and regional court

The African Court of Justice and Human Rights (ACJHR) is a prospective international and regional court in Africa. It would be created by a merger of the African Court on Human and Peoples' Rights and the Court of Justice of the African Union, once the Protocol on the Statute of the African Court of Justice and Human Rights (adopted in 2008) enters into force. It would replace the African Court on Human and Peoples' Rights and become the primary judicial agency of the African Union.

The court would have two chambers, one for general legal matters and one for rulings on the human rights treaties. It would also have a third chamber for prosecuting international crimes if the Protocol on Amendments to the Protocol on the Statute of the African Court of Justice and Human Rights (often called the Malabo Protocol) enters into force. This would give the Court jurisdiction over 14 international crimes.

== History ==
A merging of the African Court on Human and People's Rights and the Court of Justice of the African Union was proposed by the chairperson of the Assembly of the African Union and the head of the Federal Republic of Nigeria, President Olusegun Obasanjo, in 2004. This idea of uniting the two courts was raised because of the African Union's insufficient funds. In January 2005, a panel of legal experts assembled in Addis Ababa, Ethiopia to formulate a draft protocol that honored the integrity of the two independent courts, yet established a way to regulate the decorum of the now merged court. Afterwards, a panel met in Nigeria to propose a draft protocol to the Executive Council of the African Union. In March 2005, the draft was approved and was passed to legal experts for their recommendations. The recommendations were presented at the African Union Summit in Sirte, Libya. It was decided that the headquarters would be in the East region of Africa by the Assembly of Heads of State and Government.
