= Habeas Corpus Restoration Act of 2007 =

U.S. Law

A bill, provisionally called the Habeas Corpus Restoration Act of 2007, S. 185, passed the United States Senate Judiciary Committee on Thursday, June 7, 2007.

The bill was sponsored by Democratic Senator Patrick Leahy and (formerly) Republican Senator Arlen Specter. Specter joined the Democrats in supporting the bill, which the Committee passed on a vote of 11 to 8, without debate. The bill would restore the right for Guantanamo captives to access the US court system under the principle of habeas corpus, a right that had been stripped from them by the Military Commissions Act of 2006.

A version of the bill was introduced in the House of Representatives (H.R. 1416) by Jerrold Nadler (D-New York) and Jane Harman (D-California).

On June 29, 2007, the Supreme Court agreed to hear outstanding habeas corpus cases, opening up the possibility that they might overturn some or all of the Military Commissions Act.

The Act was attached, as an amendment, to a defense bill. On September 19, 2007, the Senate voted on a cloture motion for including the Habeas Corpus Restoration Act as an amendment to the FY 2008 Defense Department Authorization bill. The final vote was 56–43, just four votes short of overriding the Republican filibuster. Every Democrat voted for the bill as well as six Republicans. Those Republicans were Chuck Hagel (R-Nebraska), Richard Lugar (R-Indiana), Gordon Smith (R-Oregon), Olympia Snowe (R-Maine), John Sununu (R-New Hampshire), and Arlen Specter (R-Pennsylvania), who sponsored the bill. The only non-Republican who voted against the bill was Sen. Joseph Lieberman (I-Connecticut).

Senator Patrick Leahy (D-Vermont) stated that the Senate's passage of the Military Commissions Act, which suspended habeas corpus for detainees, "calls into question the United States' historic role of defender of human rights in the world. It accomplishes what opponents could never accomplish on the battlefield, whittling away our own liberties."

== See also ==
- Military Police: Enemy Prisoners of War, Retained Personnel, Civilian Internees and Other Detainees – United States Army regulation
- Habeas corpus petitions of Guantanamo Bay detainees
