= Elsie Nwanwuri Thompson =

High Court judge of Rivers State, Nigeria

Elsie Nwanwuri Thompson is a judge of the High Court of Rivers State, Nigeria. Born and raised in Port Harcourt, she served as the Country Vice President and National President for the International Federation of Women Lawyers Nigeria. She is also a resource person at seminars and conferences. On 27 July 2010, she became the first Nigerian to be elected to the African Court on Human and Peoples' Rights for a six-year term. She was vice president of the court from 2014 to 2016.

== Education and career ==
Thompson earned her bachelor of laws degree (LLB) with honours from Queen Mary College University of London. She was admitted to the English bar in 1984 and was also admitted to the Nigerian bar in 1985. For about 20 years, she served in the private legal practice and worked on human rights cases especially on women's rights. In 1998, she was named one of Junior Chamber International's "Ten Outstanding Young Persons of the year".

Thompson has held various posts at the International Federation of Women Lawyers, including Country Vice President (National President) and Regional Vice President for Africa. She was elected as judge of the African Court on Human and Peoples' Rights on 27 July 2010 and rose to become Vice-president in September 2014. She is a member of the Honourable Society of Gray's Inn and also a Fellow of the Chartered Institute of Arbitrators.

== Personal life ==
She is married to Sir Igonibo Emmanuel Thompson and they have children.

== See also ==
- List of people from Rivers State
- African Court on Human and Peoples' Rights
