= El Hadji Guissé =

Senegalese judge

El Hadji Guissé is a Senegalese judge. Guissé began practicing law in 1970 and was elected as a judge to the African Court on Human and Peoples' Rights from 2006-2010. He has also worked in the United Nations as special Rapporteur on The Right of Water in 1998.
