= Ntyam Mengue =

Cameroonian jurist

Ntyam Ondo Suzanne Mengue Zomo is a Cameroonian jurist who was elected to the African Court on Human and Peoples' Rights for a six-year term in 2016.

== Early life and education ==
Mengue was born in the Vallée-du-Ntem in the South Region of Cameroon in 1954. Her father was a religious minister. She graduated from the National School of Administration and Magistracy in 1982.

== Career ==
Mengue worked as a deputy public prosecutor in Sangmélima and Douala between 1982 and 1987. In 1990, she became President of the Court of First Instance in Yaoundé and then in 1992 Vice President of the Court of Appeal. In 1998 she became a Counsellor of the Supreme Court of Cameroon. In 2001, she was one of sixty four judges nominated as a permanent judge of the International Criminal Tribunal for the former Yugoslavia.

Mengue was President of the Administrative section of the Supreme Court from 2010 until 2015, and has been President of the Court's Commercial Section since 2015. She has been a member of the National Commission of Human Rights and Freedoms of Cameroon since 2003, where she has acted as rapporteur.

Mengue was elected as a judge of the African Court on Human and Peoples' Rights for a six-year term in July 2016 at the African Union summit in Kigali.

== Personal life ==
Mengue is a member of the Association of Cameroon Female Lawyers and the Christian Women's Association of the Cameroon Presbyterian Church. She is fluent in French and English. She has 6 children: 2 sons, 2 daughters and 2 step daughters
