= Chafika Bensaoula =

Algerian jurist

Chafika Bensaoula is an Algerian jurist who was elected to the African Court on Human and Peoples' Rights in 2017. In June 2025, she became the court's vice president.

== Early life and education ==
Chafika Bensaoula was born in Algeria and has a doctorate in public law.

== Career ==
Bensaoula has been a judge of the Criminal Affair Chambers and Court of Appeal in Algeria. She is a lecturer at the National School of Magistracy in Algeria. She was Director of the Department of Legal Studies and Documentation at the Ministry of Justice. In April 2016, she was nominated for the International Narcotics Control Board. She is on the governing board of administrators for the International Institute for Justice and the Rule of Law.

Bensaoula was elected to the African Court at the African Union meeting in Addis Ababa in January 2017, alongside Malawian Tujilane Chizumila. The two were sworn in on 6 March, bringing the number of women on the court to five of eleven judges for the first time and fulfilling the gender parity requirement of the Protocol establishing the court.

On 2 June 2025, Bensaoula was elected Vice President of the Court, alongside Modibo Sacko of Mali who was elected president.

== Personal life ==
Bensaoula speaks Arabic, English and French.
