= African Court on Human and Peoples' Rights =

International court

The African Court on Human and Peoples' Rights, also known simply as the African Court, is an international court established by member states of the African Union (AU) to implement provisions of the African Charter on Human and Peoples' Rights (also known as the Banjul Charter). Seated in Arusha, Tanzania, it is the judicial arm of the AU and one of three regional human rights courts (together with the European Court of Human Rights and the Inter-American Court of Human Rights).

The African Court was created pursuant to a protocol to the Banjul Charter adopted in 1998 in Burkina Faso by the Organization of African Unity (OAU), the predecessor of the AU. The protocol came into force on 25 January 2004, following ratification by more than 15 countries. The court's first judges were elected in 2006 and it issued its first judgment in 2009.

The African Court's mandate is to complement and reinforce the functions of the African Commission on Human and Peoples' Rights, a quasi-judicial body that monitors implementation of the charter and recommends cases to the court. It has jurisdiction over all cases and disputes submitted to it concerning the interpretation and application of the Banjul Charter, the protocol to the charter, and any other applicable human rights instrument. The court can issue advisory opinions on legal matters and adjudicate contentious cases.

The court is composed of eleven judges nominated by member states of the AU and elected by the latter's Assembly of Heads of State and Government. Judges serve six-year terms and may only be re-elected once. The president of the court resides and works full-time in Arusha, while the other ten judges work on a part-time basis. Registry, managerial, and administrative functions are executed by a registrar.

Thirty-four African countries have ratified the protocol establishing the African Court, of which only nine have made a special declaration allowing individuals and NGOs to submit cases directly to the court: Burkina Faso, Ghana, Malawi, Mali, Rwanda, Tanzania, Republic of Côte d'Ivoire, Tunisia, and the Gambia; otherwise, cases must be submitted to the African Commission, which then determines whether to refer it to the court.

As of September 2021, the African Court has delivered 259 decisions, including 131 judgments and 128 orders, and has 217 pending cases.

== Members ==
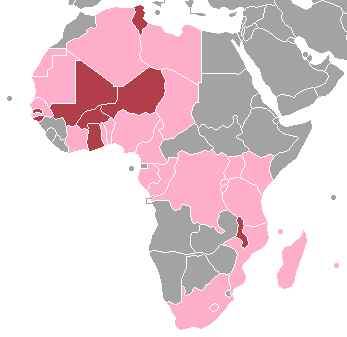
Members of the African Court on Human and Peoples' Rights. Burgundy – fully recognize the competence of the court Pink – other states that have ratified the protocol

As of January 2019, nine state parties to the protocol have made a declaration recognizing the competence of the Court to receive cases from non-government organizations (NGOs) and individuals. The nine states are Benin, Burkina Faso, Côte d'Ivoire, Ghana, Mali, Malawi, Rwanda, Tanzania, the Gambia and Tunisia. Altogether, 34 states have ratified the protocol: Algeria, Benin, Burkina Faso, Burundi, Cameroon, Chad, Côte d'Ivoire, Comoros, Democratic Republic of Congo, Republic of the Congo, Gabon, Gambia, Ghana, Guinea-Bissau, Kenya, Libya, Lesotho, Madagascar, Mali, Malawi, Mozambique, Mauritania, Mauritius, Nigeria, Niger, Rwanda, Sahrawi Arab Democratic Republic, South Africa, Senegal, Tanzania, Togo, Tunisia, Uganda, and Zambia.

Côte d'Ivoire announced that it was withdrawing from the court in April 2020, after the tribunal ordered the government to suspend an arrest warrant for Guillaume Soro.

== Mission ==
The African Court on Human and Peoples' Rights was established to complement and reinforce the functions of the African Commission on Human and Peoples' Rights (the African Commission – often referred to as the Banjul Commission), which is a quasi-judicial body charged with monitoring the implementation of the Charter.

== Mandate ==
The mission of the Court is to enhance the protective mandate of the African Commission on Human and Peoples' Rights by strengthening the human rights protection system in Africa and ensuring respect for and compliance with the African Charter on Human and Peoples' Rights, as well as other international human rights instruments, through judicial decisions.

== Vision ==
The vision of the Court is an Africa with a viable human rights culture.

== Core values ==
- Judicial independence from any partisanship, bias, influence, whether it comes from States, NGOs, funding agencies, or individuals.
- Fair and impartial application and interpretation of the provisions of the African Charter, the Protocol, the Rules, and other relevant international human rights instruments.
- Transparent and ethical accountability in the operations of the Court.
- Fundamental rights of every individual to enjoy basic civil, political, social, economic, and cultural rights are upheld.
- Collaboration with relevant stakeholders in pursuance of the Court's objective of protecting human and peoples' rights.
- Non-discrimination and equality in performance of the work of the Court.
- Integrity of the Judges and staff working at the Court.
- Provide equal access to all potential users of the Court.
- Be responsive to the needs of those who approach the Court.

== Strategic objectives ==
- Exercise jurisdiction in all cases and disputes brought before it concerning the interpretation and application of the Charter, the protocol and any other relevant instrument relating to human rights ratified by the States concerned;
- Collaborate with sub-regional and national judicial bodies to enhance the protection of human rights on the continent;
- To enhance the participation of the African people in the work of the Court;
- To enhance the capacity of the Registry of the Court to be able to fulfill its mandate; and
- To enhance working relationship between the Court and the African Commission.

== Election of judges ==
On January 22, 2006, the Eighth Ordinary Session of the Executive Council of the African Union elected the first eleven Judges of the African Court on Human and Peoples' Rights.

Judges are normally elected for six-year terms and can be re-elected once. The President and Vice-President are elected to two-year terms and can be re-elected once.

The Court had its First Ordinary Session from July 2–5, 2006, in Banjul, the Gambia.

== Location ==
Tanzania is the Court's host state. The Court's temporary premises are located in Arusha, Tanzania, at the Phase II of the Mwalimu Julius Nyerere Conservation Centre Complex along Dodoma Road. The plans for Tanzania to build permanent premises for the Court have experienced repeated delays, and the Court has stressed the necessity of purpose-built premises for it to properly carry out its work.

== Jurisdiction ==
The Court has jurisdiction to determine applications against state parties of the Court Protocol. To date, 34 states (listed above) have ratified the protocol.

An application against these states may be made by the African Commission or African inter-governmental organisations.

Where a state has made a declaration accepting the right of individual application under Article 34(6) of the Court's Protocol, an individual or NGO with observer status before the African Commission on Human and Peoples' Rights may make an application. As it stands, 9 states have made the declaration: Benin, Burkina Faso, Côte d'Ivoire, Ghana, Malawi, Mali, Tanzania, Tunisia, and The Gambia. Rwanda made a declaration in 2013 but withdrew it in 2016, and Tanzania gave notice that it was withdrawing its declaration (which will take effect a year later) in November 2019.

== Judgments ==
On December 15, 2009, the Court delivered its first judgment, finding an application against Senegal inadmissible.

The court's first judgment on the merits of a case was issued on June 14, 2013, in a case involving Tanzania. It found Tanzania had violated its citizens' rights to freely participate in government directly or through representatives regardless of their party affiliation, and ordered Tanzania to take constitutional, legislative, and all other measures necessary to remedy these violations.

On March 28, 2014, the court ruled against Burkina Faso, in a case brought by the family of Norbert Zongo, a newspaper editor who was murdered in 1998. The court found that Burkina Faso had failed to properly investigate the murder, and had failed in its obligations to protect journalists.

On June 23, 2022, the court ruled that the Kenyan government must pay the evicted and displaced Okiek people 157,850,000 shillings for decades of material and moral damages, recognize their indigeneity and help get them official titles to their ancestral lands.

== Composition ==
Name	State	Position	Elected	Term ends
Justice Ben Kioko	Kenya	Vice President	2012*	2024
Justice Rafââ Ben Achour	Tunisia	Judge	2014*	2026
Justice Ntyam Mengue	Cameroon	Judge	2016*	2028
Justice Tujilane Chizumila	Malawi	Judge	2017*	2028
Justice Bensaoula Chafika	Algeria	Judge	2017*	2028
Justice Blaise Tchikaya	Democratic Republic of Congo	Vice President	2018	2024
Justice Stella Isibhakhomen Anukam	Nigeria	Judge	2018	2024
Justice Imani Daud Aboud	Tanzania	President	2018	2024
Justice Dumisa Ntsebeza	South Africa	Judge	2021	2027

* Indicates elected for a second term.

== Former judges ==
Name	State	Position	Elected	Term ended
Justice George W. Kanyeihamba	Uganda	Judge	2006	2008
Justice Jean Emile Somda	Burkina Faso	Judge	2006	2008
Justice Githu Muigai	Kenya	Judge	2008	2010
Justice Hamdi Faraj Fannoush	Libya	Judge	2006	2010
Justice Kellelo Justina Mafoso-Guni	Lesotho	Judge	2006	2010
Justice Sophia A.B. Akuffo	Ghana	President	2012	2014
Justice Jean Mutsinzi	Rwanda	President	2008	2010
Justice Gerard Niyungeko	Burundi	President	2006	2012
Justice Bernard Ngoepe	South Africa	Judge	2006	2014
Justice Joseph Nyamihana Mulenga	Uganda	Judge	2008	2014
Justice Fatsah Ouguergouz	Algeria	Judge	2006	2016
Justice Duncan Tambala	Malawi	Judge	2010	2016
Justice Augustino S. L. Ramadhani	Tanzania	Judge	2010	2016
Justice Elsie Nwanwuri Thompson	Nigeria	Vice-President	2010	2016
Justice El Hadji Guissé	Senegal	Judge	2012	2018
Justice Solome Balungi Bossa	Uganda	Judge	2014	2020
Justice Sylvain Ore	Côte d'Ivoire	President	2014	2020
Justice Angelo Vasco Matusse	Mozambique	Judge	2014	2020
Justice Marie Thérèse Mukamulisa	Rwanda	Judge	2016	2022

== Planned merger with the African Court of Justice ==
On July 1, 2008, at the African Union Summit in Sharm El Sheikh, Egypt, Heads of State and Government signed a protocol on the merger of the AfCHPR with the still non-existent African Court of Justice following a decision by member states at a June 2004 African Union Summit. As of 18 June 2020, only eight countries have ratified the protocol out of 15 needed for its entry into force. The new court would be known as the African Court of Justice and Human Rights.

== See also ==
- European Court of Human Rights – regional court originally established in 1950
- Inter-American Court of Human Rights – regional court established in 1979
- Linguistic rights
- List of Linguistic Rights in Constitutions
