= Court of Justice of the African Union =

Judicial organ

The Court of Justice of the African Union was originally intended to be the "principal judicial organ" of the African Union (Protocol of the Court of Justice of the African Union, Article 2.2) with authority to rule on disputes over interpretation of AU treaties. The Court has, however, never come into existence because the African Union has decided that it should be merged with the African Court on Human and Peoples' Rights to form a new court: the African Court of Justice and Human Rights (ACJHR). Underlying this decision was the concern at the growing number of AU institutions, which the AU could not afford to support.

A protocol to set up the Court of Justice was adopted in 2003, and entered into force in 2009. It was, however, superseded by a protocol creating the African Court of Justice and Human Rights.

The merger protocol was adopted during the 11th African Union Summit in July 2008. The united court will be based in Arusha, Tanzania.

== See also ==
- African Court on Human and Peoples' Rights
- East African Court of Justice
- Caribbean Court of Justice
