= African Commission on Human and Peoples' Rights =

Quasi-judicial body

The African Commission on Human and Peoples' Rights (ACHPR) is a quasi-judicial body tasked with promoting and protecting human rights and collective (peoples') rights throughout the African continent as well as interpreting the African Charter on Human and Peoples' Rights (also known as the Banjul Charter or the African Charter) and considering individual complaints of violations of the Charter. This includes investigating human rights violations, creating and approving programs of action towards encouraging human rights, and set up effect communication between them and states to get first hand information on violations of human rights. Although the ACHPR is under a regional government facility, they don't have any actual power and enforcement over laws. This ends up in them drafting up proposals to send up the chain of command to the Assembly of Heads of State and Government and they will act accordingly.

ACHPR was based on the African Charter which is the regional human rights protectors of human rights for Africa. The charter has twenty-nine articles that go into great detail on the rights and freedoms that follow a strict code of non-discrimination. The support and excitement over the Europeans current rights system, the evolution of granting everyone human rights, is what helped streamline the creation of this commission and other courts in Africa. The Commission came into existence with the coming into force, on 21 October 1986, of the African Charter (adopted by the Organization of African Unity (OAU) on 27 June 1981). Although its authority rests on the African Charter, the Commission reports to the Assembly of Heads of State and Government of the African Union (formerly the OAU). Its first members were elected by the OAU's 23rd Assembly of Heads of State and Government in June 1987 and the Commission was formally installed for the first time on 2 November of that year. For the first two years of its existence, the Commission was based at the OAU Secretariat in Addis Ababa, Ethiopia, but in November 1989, it relocated to Banjul, Gambia. The ACHPR is not the African Union Commission, which was formerly known as the OAU Secretariat.

In 2019, the ACHPR and UN Human Rights Office signed a Memorandum of Understanding to cooperate on the ACHPR's mandate in the African Charter.

The Commission meets twice a year, usually in March or April and in October or November. One of these meetings is usually held in Banjul, where the Commission's secretariat is located; the others may take place in any African state.

== Composition ==
The commission opened its doors in 1987 with promises of the protection and evolution of Africa's human rights. The Assembly of Heads of State and Government, make their decisions by a vote of two-thirds the majority of all representatives from each country. The ACHPR is made up of eleven members, elected by secret ballot at the OAU Assembly of Heads of State and Government (subsequently, by the African Union's Assembly). These members, who serve six-year renewable terms, are "chosen from amongst African personalities of the highest reputation, known for their high morality, integrity, impartiality and competence in matters of human and peoples' rights" (Charter, Article 31) and, in selecting these personalities, particular consideration is given "to persons having legal experience".

The members are to enjoy full independence in discharging their duties and serve on a personal basis (i.e., not representing their home states); however, no member state may have more than one of its nationals on the Commission at any given time. The members choose, from among their own number, a chairperson and a Vice Chairperson, who each serve two-year renewable terms.

Name	Country of origin	Position	Elected	Term	Re-elected
Solomon Ayele Dersso	Ethiopia	Chairperson	2015	2021	
Hatem Essaiem	Tunisia	Member	2017	2023	
Jamesina Essie L. King	Sierra Leone	Member	2015	2021	
Lawrence Murugu Mute	Kenya	Member	2013	2019	
Zainabo Sylvie Kayitesi	Rwanda	Member	2007	2009	2010, 2013
Maria Teresa Manuela	Angola	Member	2017	2023	
Rémy Ngoy Lumbu	(Democratic Republic of the Congo) Democratic Republic of Congo	Vice-chairperson	2017	2023	
Yeung Kam John Yeung Sik Yuen	Mauritius	Member	2007	2019	2013
Lucy Asuagbor	Cameroon	Member	2013	2019	
Selma Sassi Safer	Algeria	Member	2023	2029	
Soyata Maiga	Mali	Member	2007	2020	2014

== Mandate ==
The Commission has three broad areas of responsibility:

- Promoting human and peoples' rights
- Protecting human and peoples' rights
- Interpreting the African Charter on Human and Peoples' Rights

The goals above may have been halted as the Commission was placed under heavy burdens, mainly financial issues in the late 80's, as they tried to complete activities for the countries. The countries of Africa, excluding Ethiopia and Liberia, are heavily influenced by colonialism, overall have a weak government, and a declining economy. In pursuit of these goals, the Commission is mandated to "collect documents, undertake studies and researches on African problems in the field of human and peoples, rights, organise seminars, symposia and conferences, disseminate information, encourage national and local institutions concerned with human and peoples' rights and, should the case arise, give its views or make recommendations to governments" (Charter, Art. 45).

With the creation of the African Court on Human and Peoples' Rights (under a protocol to the Charter which was adopted in 1998 and entered into force in January 2004), the Commission will have the additional task of preparing cases for submission to the Court's jurisdiction. In a July 2004 decision, the African Union's Assembly resolved that the future Court on Human and Peoples' Rights would be integrated with the African Court of Justice.

== Activities ==
In 2011, the commission brought before the African Court on Human and Peoples' Rights a case against Libya.

In 2021, the commission established the Commission of Inquiry into the situation in the Tigray Region to investigate human rights violation in the Tigray War under ACHPR resolution 482 of 12 May 2021.

== Special mechanisms ==
The commission has several special mechanisms in the form of special rapporteurs, working groups and committees that investigate and report on specific human rights issues, such as freedom of expression, women's rights, indigenous populations and torture. Each mechanism prepares and presents a report on its activities to the Commission at every ordinary session.

== Network ==
The ACHPR relies on a network of nongovernmental organizations (NGOs) that are required to submit reports to the commission every two years. The commission has granted 514 NGOs with observer status.

== Bibliography ==
- Ankumah, Evelyn A., African Commission on Human and Peoples' Rights, Kluwer, 1996
- Bösl, A & Diescho, J., Human Rights in Africa. Legal perspectives on their protection and promotion, with a foreword by Desmond Tutu, Macmillan 2009.
- Murray, RH. Human Rights in Africa: From the OAU to the African Union, Cambridge University Press, 2004.
- Evans, MD & Murray, RH (Eds.), The African Charter on Human and Peoples' Rights: The System at Work, Cambridge University Press, 2002.
- Evans, MD & Murray, RH (Eds.), The African Charter on Human and Peoples' Rights (Second Edition): The System in Practice 1986–2006, Cambridge University Press, 2008.
- Murray, RH & Evans, MD (Eds.), Documents of the African Commission on Human and Peoples' Rights, Hart Publishing, 2001.
- Numerous academic articles on the jurisprudence of the African Commission published in the African Human Rights Law Journal
- Reports and information about the ACHPR from the International Service for Human Rights
- Reports of ACHPR cases published in the African Human Rights Law Reports
- Regular updates of news on the ACHPR published by the Netherlands Quarterly of Human Rights

== See also ==
- African Charter on Human and Peoples' Rights
- African Court on Human and Peoples' Rights
- African Court of Justice
- African Human Rights Law Reports
- Special Rapporteur on Women's Rights in Africa
- Inter-American Commission on Human Rights
- List of Linguistic Rights in Constitutions (Africa)
- Linguistic rights
