= 175th meridian =

175th meridian may refer to:

- 175th meridian east, a line of longitude east of the Greenwich Meridian
- 175th meridian west, a line of longitude west of the Greenwich Meridian

175th meridian west	175th meridian east
