= Agreement on the Conservation of Small Cetaceans of the Baltic, North East Atlantic, Irish and North Seas =

1991 conservation agreement

ASCOBANS
Agreement on the Conservation of Small Cetaceans of the Baltic, North East Atlantic, Irish and North Seas
- ASCOBANS Official Logo
- Type: Agreement
- Signed: 17 March 1992
- Location: New York, US
- Effective: 29 March 1994
- Condition: Ratification by 6 range states
- Signatories: 6
- Parties: 10
- Depositary: Secretary-General of the United Nations
- Languages: Russian, German, French, English

Agreement on the Conservation of Small Cetaceans of the Baltic, North East Atlantic, Irish and North Seas, often abbreviated to ASCOBANS, is a regional agreement on the protection of small cetaceans that was concluded as the Agreement on the Conservation of Small Cetaceans of the Baltic and North Seas under the auspices of the UNEP Convention on the Conservation of Migratory Species of Wild Animals, or Bonn Convention, in September 1991. It was opened for signatures in March 1992 and entered into force in March 1994. In February 2008, an extension of the Agreement area came into force which changed the name to “Agreement on the Conservation of Small Cetaceans of the Baltic, North East Atlantic, Irish and North Seas”. ASCOBANS covers all species of toothed whales (odontoceti) in the Agreement Area, with the exception of the sperm whale (Physeter macrocephalus).

== Background ==
Numerous species of small cetaceans live in the Baltic, Irish and North Seas and the North East Atlantic including dolphins, whales and harbour porpoises. The harbour porpoise is the most common small cetacean species in the North Sea and the only cetacean species native to the Baltic Sea and therefore is the flagship species of the Agreement. As migratory species, cetaceans face of a number of threats caused by human activities. These include habitat loss, marine pollution, acoustic disturbances from various sources and, most importantly, incidental catch by entanglement in fishing gear, so-called bycatch. Every year, thousands of whales, dolphins and porpoises fall victim to bycatch, drowning because they can no longer swim up to the surface for a breath of air.

== Organisational structure ==
The Agreement has three main bodies that collaborate towards the implementation of ASCOBANS:

=== Meeting of the Parties ===
The Meeting of the Parties is the decision-making body of the Agreement. It met every three years from 1994 through 2012, but after of the 7th meeting in 2012, it now meets every four years to assess progress and develop further steps in the implementation of ASCOBANS. Apart from the Member States, Non-Party Range States and relevant regional, intergovernmental and non-governmental organisations can attain observer status to attend MOP meetings without having a decision-making mandate themselves.

=== Advisory Committee ===
Each Party to the Agreement can nominate one member and a number of advisors to the Advisory Committee, which meets once a year. The role of the Committee is to provide scientific and policy advice to the Secretariat (see below) and the Meeting of the Parties. As with the MOP, external observers may take part in AC meetings, while the nominated members are the sole decision makers.

=== Secretariat ===
The ASCOBANS Secretariat, located in Bonn, acts as the coordinating body of the Agreement. It gathers and disseminates information to the MOP and the AC. It plays an important role in awareness-raising and provides advice and support to the Parties, assisting them in the implementation of the Agreement. It services the sessions of the Meeting of the Parties and meetings of the Advisory Committee. The ASCOBANS Secretariat along with other Regional Agreement Secretariats within the framework of the Bonn Convention is integrated into the CMS Secretariat. The 5th Meeting of the Parties of ASCOBANS (2006) decided that from 1 January 2007 the UNEP/CMS Secretariat would serve as the Secretariat for the ASCOBANS Agreement; and the Executive Secretary of UNEP/CMS would be the acting Executive Secretary of ASCOBANS. The current Acting Executive Secretary is Andy Raine.

== Species ==
The most important species covered by the Agreement are:

- harbour porpoise (Phocoena phocoena)
- bottlenose dolphin (Tursiops truncatus)
- common dolphin (Delphinus delphis)
- white-beaked dolphin (Lagenorhynchus albirostris)
- Atlantic white-sided dolphin (Lagenorhynchus acutus)
- striped dolphin (Stenella coeruleoalba)
- Risso’s dolphin (Grampus griseus)
- killer whale (Orcinus orca)
- long-finned pilot whale (Globicephala melas)
- northern bottle-nosed whale (Hyperoodon ampullatus) and
- other beaked whales (Ziphiidae).

== Agreement area and member states ==
ASCOBANS is open for accession by all Range States (i.e. any state that exercises jurisdiction over any part of the range of a species covered by the Agreement or whose flag vessels engage in operations adversely affecting small cetaceans in the Agreement area) and by regional economic integration organisations.

Originally only covering the North and Baltic Sea, as of 3 February 2008 the ASCOBANS Area has been extended to include also the Irish Sea and parts of the North Eastern Atlantic. It is defined as follows: "… the marine environment of the Baltic and North Seas and contiguous area of the North East Atlantic, as delimited by the shores of the Gulfs of Bothnia and Finland; to the south-east by latitude 36°N, where this line of latitude meets the line joining the lighthouses of Cape St. Vincent (Portugal) and Casablanca (Morocco); to the south-west by latitude 36°N and longitude 15°W; to the north-west by longitude 15°W and a line drawn through the following points: latitude 59°N/longitude 15°W, latitude 60°N/longitude 5°W, latitude 61°N/longitude 4°W; latitude 62°N/ longitude 3°W; to the north by latitude 62°N; and including the Kattegat and the Sound and Belt passages."

=== Parties ===
- Belgium
- Denmark
- Finland
- France
- Germany
- Lithuania
- Netherlands
- Poland
- Sweden
- United Kingdom

The European Union signed the Agreement, but never ratified it.

=== Non-party range states ===
- Estonia
- Ireland
- Latvia
- Norway
- Portugal
- Russia
- Spain

== Harbour porpoise conservation ==
Three action plans for harbour porpoises specific to the situation in different parts of the Agreement Area have been concluded to date.

- Jastarnia Plan, a Recovery Plan for Baltic Harbour Porpoises (2009), (2016 Revision)
- Conservation Plan for Harbour Porpoises in the North Sea(2009), (2024 Revision)
- Conservation Plan for the Harbour Porpoise Population in the Western Baltic, the Belt Sea and the Kattegat (2012)

== Implementation ==
Since migrating cetaceans regularly cross-national boundaries, their protection can only effectively be achieved by means of international cooperation. Therefore, the aim of ASCOBANS is to promote close cooperation amongst Parties with a view to achieving and maintaining a favourable conservation status for small cetaceans in the Agreement Area. A Conservation and Management Plan, which forms part of the Agreement, obliges Parties to engage in habitat conservation and management, surveys and research, pollution mitigation and public information. To achieve its aim, ASCOBANS also cooperates with Range States that have not (yet) acceded to the Agreement, with relevant intergovernmental organizations, and non-governmental organizations. To aid implementation of the Agreement, ASCOBANS Parties have adopted several resolutions.

Additionally, a number of Working Groups have been established to coordinate the Agreement's work regarding specific issues such as bycatch, underwater noise or specific species such as the Baltic Proper harbour porpoise or the common dolphin.

Since 2002, the International Day of the Baltic Harbour Porpoise (IDBHP), which is observed each year on the 3rd Sunday in May, has spread awareness of the plight of the harbour porpoise. Past national celebrations have included online-campaigns, exhibitions, events at museums and even small-scale theatre performances. Support from Parties is encouraged so that the IDBHP is observed by at least one notable institution in every country around the Baltic Sea each year.
