= 173rd meridian =

173rd meridian may refer to:

- 173rd meridian east, a line of longitude east of the Greenwich Meridian
- 173rd meridian west, a line of longitude west of the Greenwich Meridian

173rd meridian west	173rd meridian east
