= 6th meridian =

6th meridian may refer to:

- 6th meridian east, a line of longitude east of the Greenwich Meridian
- 6th meridian west, a line of longitude west of the Greenwich Meridian
- The Sixth Principal Meridian in Colorado, Kansas, Nebraska, South Dakota and Wyoming, United States, 97°22'08" west of Greenwich
- The Sixth Meridian of the Dominion Land Survey in Canada, 118° west of Greenwich
