= 7th meridian =

7th meridian may refer to:

- 7th meridian east, a line of longitude east of the Greenwich Meridian
- 7th meridian west, a line of longitude west of the Greenwich Meridian
- The Seventh Meridian of the Dominion Land Survey in Canada, 122° west of Greenwich
