= 174th meridian =

174th meridian may refer to:

- 174th meridian east, a line of longitude east of the Greenwich Meridian
- 174th meridian west, a line of longitude west of the Greenwich Meridian

174th meridian west	174th meridian east
