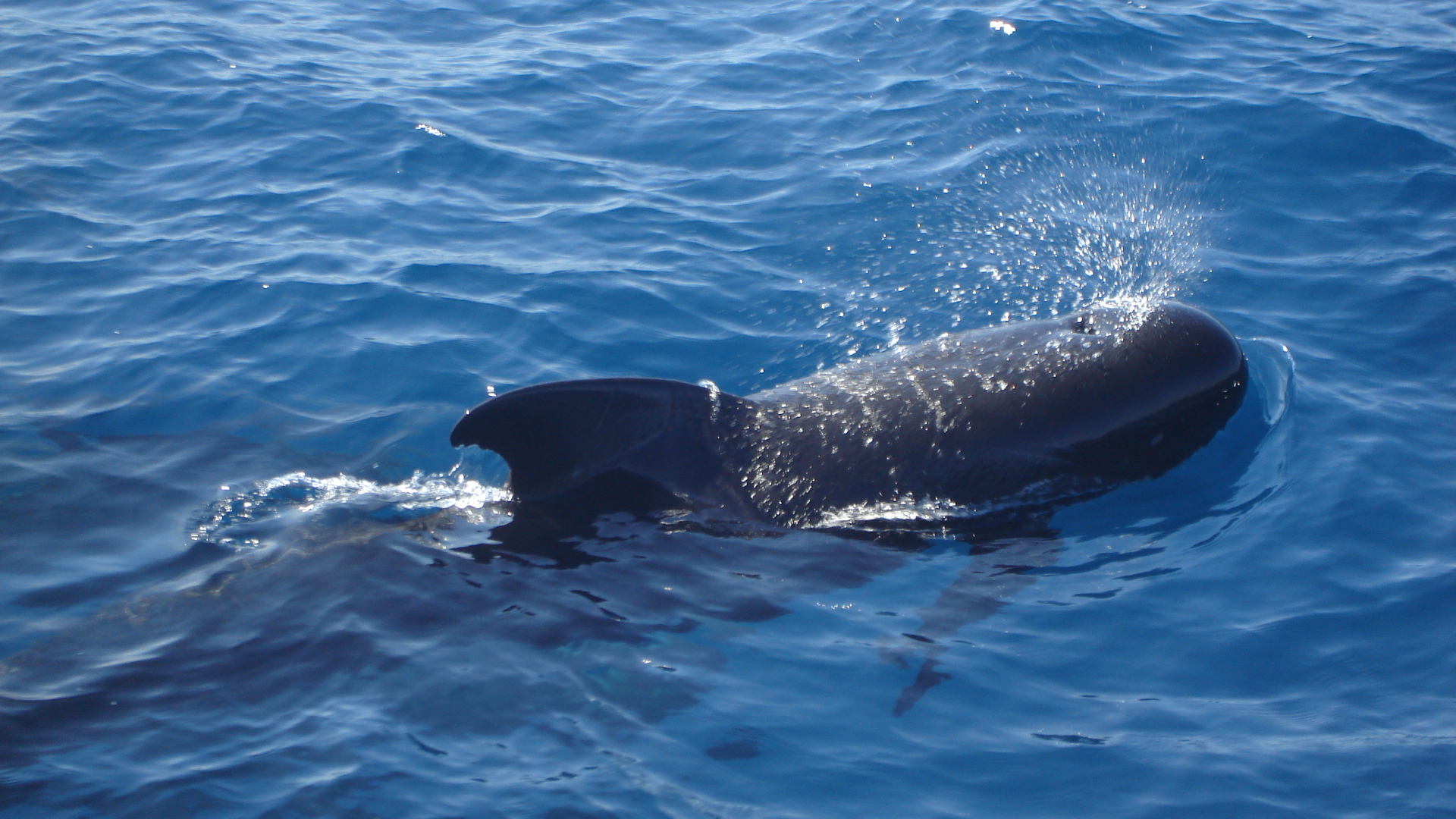

- Size compared to an average human

Conservation status
- Least Concern (IUCN 3.1)

- Secure (NatureServe)
- CITES Appendix II

Scientific classification
- Kingdom: Animalia
- Phylum: Chordata
- Class: Mammalia
- Order: Artiodactyla
- Infraorder: Cetacea
- Family: Delphinidae
- Genus: Globicephala
- Species: G. melas

Binomial name
- Globicephala melas (Traill, 1809)

Subspecies
- Globicephala melas melas Globicephala melas edwardii
- Range of the long-finned pilot whale

Synonyms
- Globicephala melaena; Globicephalus melas; Globicephalus melaenus; Globicephala intermedius (Harlan, 1827)

= Long-finned pilot whale =

Species of mammal

The long-finned pilot whale or pothead whale (Globicephala melas) is a large species of oceanic dolphin. It shares the genus Globicephala with the short-finned pilot whale (Globicephala macrorhynchus). Long-finned pilot whales are known as such because of their unusually long pectoral fins.

== Taxonomy and naming ==
=== Etymology ===
Pilot whales get their name from the original belief that there was a "pilot" or lead individual in their groups. The name for the genus, "Globicephala" is derived from a combination of Latin globus ("globe") and Greek kephale ("head"). The specific name "melas" is Greek for "black". This species has also earned the nickname of "pothead whale" in some places because the shape of its head reminded early whalers of black cooking pots.

=== Taxonomy ===
This species was first classified in 1809 by Thomas Stewart Traill and given the name "Delphinus melas". However, this scientific name was changed later to "Globicephala melaena". Then in 1986, the specific name for this species was reverted to its original form as "melas".

== Anatomy and morphology ==
=== Size ===
There is sexual dimorphism in the species. Females grow to a maximum length of up to 6 m (20 ft), and a maximum weight of up to 2,500 kg (5,500 lb). Males are significantly larger at up to 7.6 m (25 ft) in length, and weigh up to 4,500 kg (9,900 lb). This makes the long-finned pilot whale the second largest member of the dolphin family, behind the orca (Orcinus orca).

=== Appearance ===
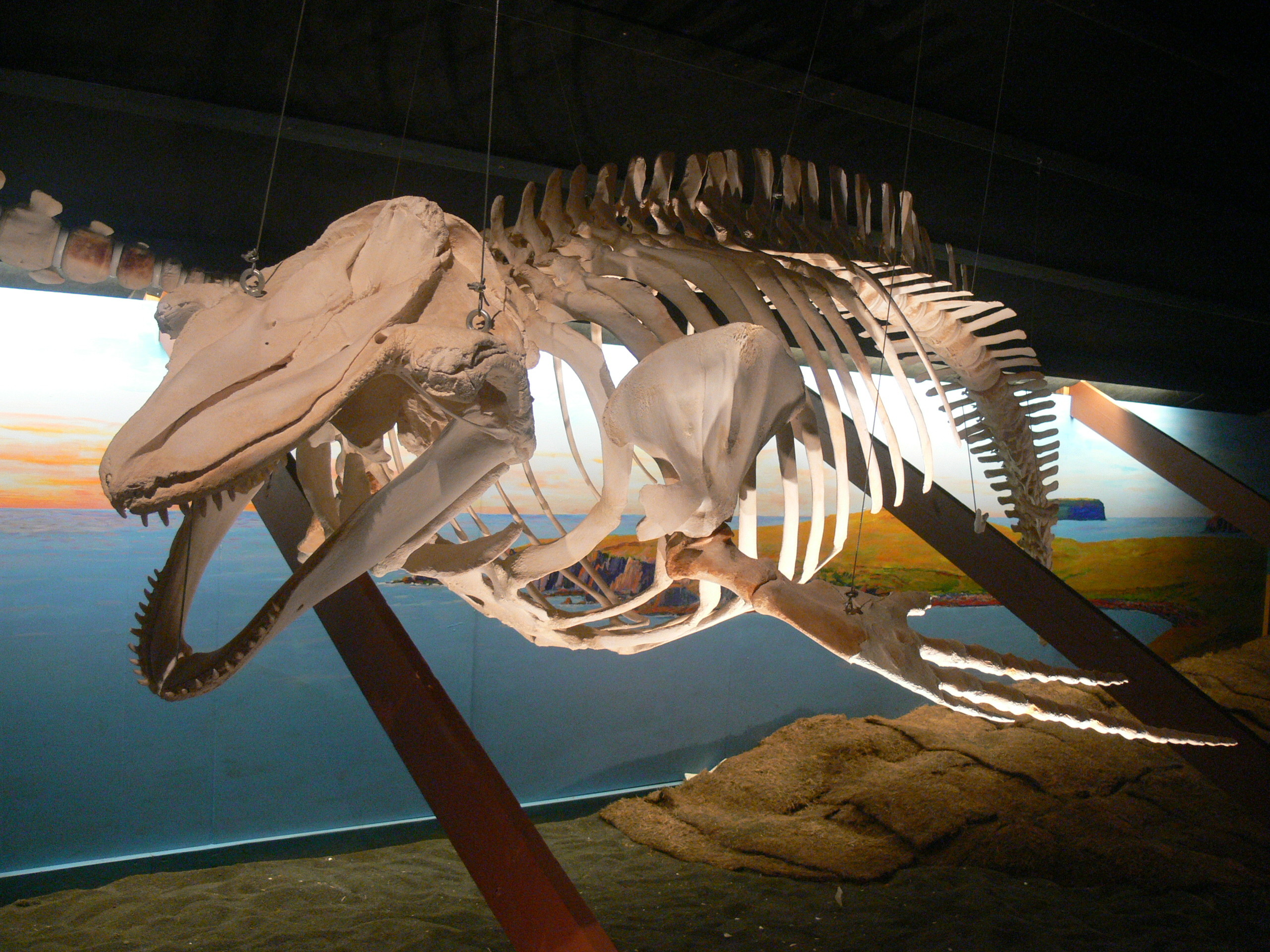
Skeleton of a long-finned pilot whale.

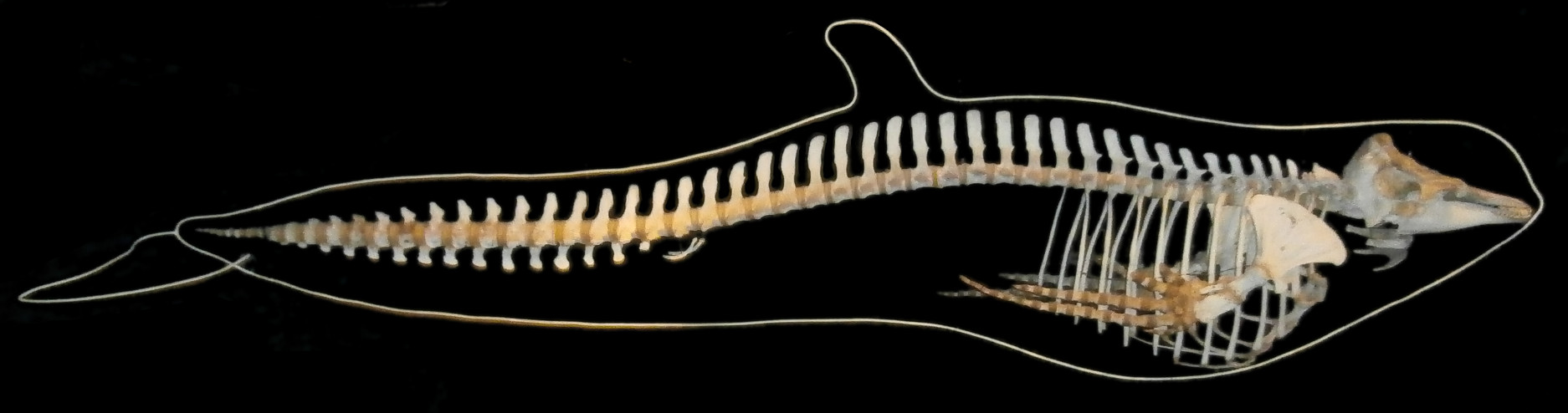

Despite its common name, the long-finned pilot whale is actually a large species of dolphin. The same is true of orcas and several other small whales. It has a bulbous forehead and is black or dark grey in colour with light-grey or white markings on the throat and belly regions. This light grey patch found on the throat of pilot whales forms the shape of an anchor. Some individuals have other distinct markings such as a light coloured area behind dorsal fin, known as a saddle patch, as well as an upwards sweeping stripe just behind the eye. The dorsal fin is thick and falcate in nature, and is located about a third of the way down the length of the animal. The common name of this species is a reference to the pilot whale's long, sickle-shaped pectoral flippers that are 18 to 27 percent of its total body length. Being a toothed whale, pilot whales have a single blowhole.

It can be challenging to tell male and female apart in the wild for many cetacean species. Long-finned pilot whales are no exception, though it was thought in the past that males had hooked dorsal fins while females did not. Recent research on fin shape has shown that this is not a predictable way to distinguish between the sexes. However, males are bigger in size, and relative fin dimensions as well as other characteristics may still be discovered to allow for distinguishing the sex of at least certain age classes for free-ranging pilot whales.

The ranges of long-finned and short-finned pilot whales overlap in some areas of the world. As the difference between them is mainly distinguished by the length of the pectoral flippers and tooth counts, it is hard to tell the two species apart in these areas.

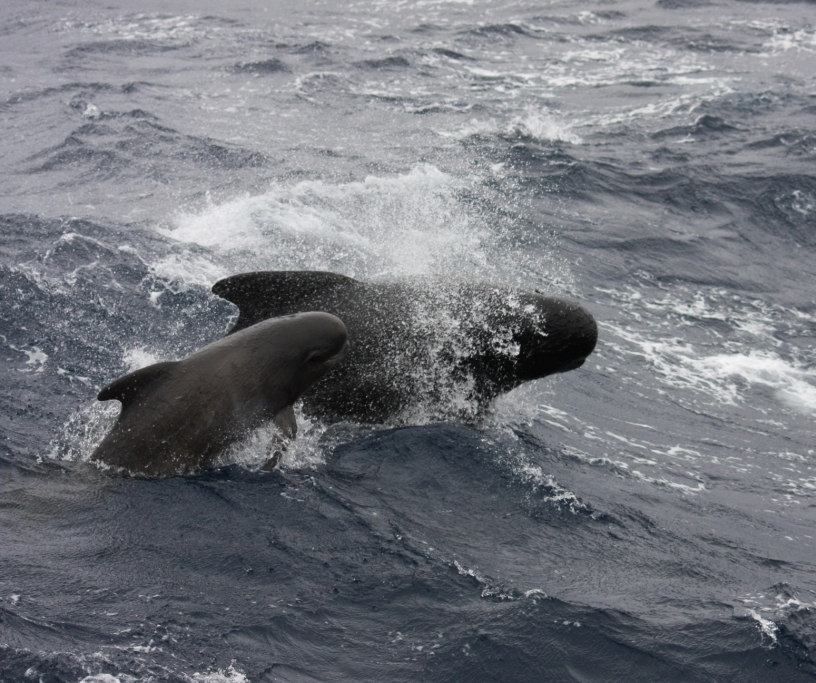
Pilot whale cow and calf – Ireland

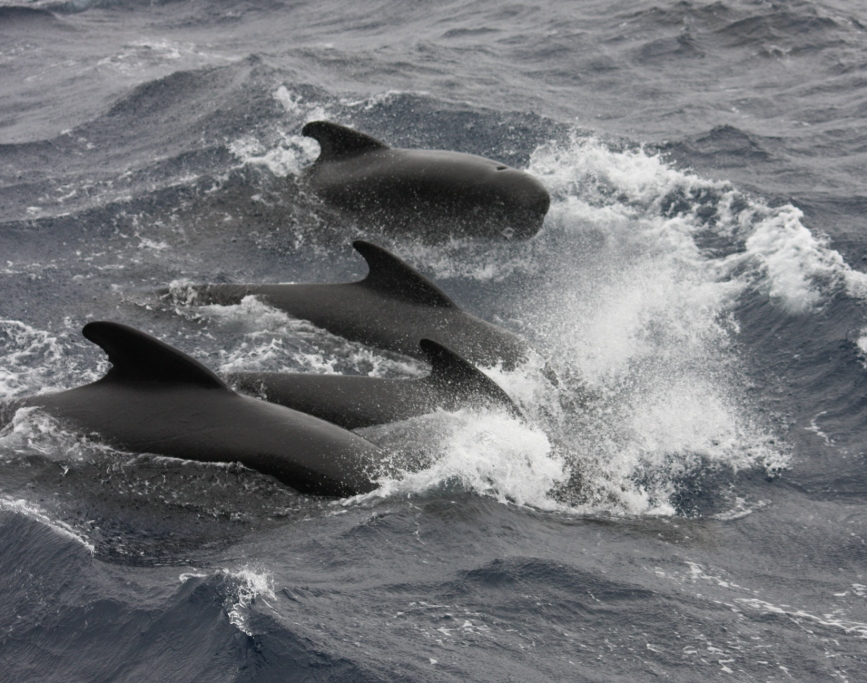
Pilot whales – Ireland

=== Physiology ===
The long-finned pilot whale has more neocortical neurons than any mammal studied to date, in fact having almost twice as many as humans.

Studies have revealed that the skin of the long-finned pilot whale has self-cleaning abilities. The surface of the skin is covered with tiny ridges (nanoridges), surrounding pores. This structure makes the surface area too small to allow organisms like barnacle larvae to get a good grip. Although the structure is made up of nanoridges, the skin of long-finned pilot whales is still smooth. The space between the ridges is filled with a mucus-like fluid, which may also play a part in self-cleaning. It is most clearly visible on newly shed skin.

== Behavior and life history ==
=== Social behavior ===
Long-finned pilot whales are very social in nature. They are usually seen in groups, which range in size from a couple of individuals to aggregations of over a thousand. However, 20 to 150 individuals are more commonly observed. Studies have shown that this species often forms small long-term social units made up of around 8-12 individuals. Genetic investigations of the pilot whales driven ashore in the Faroese hunts have shown a relatedness amongst whales, suggesting a matrilineal structure within social units. This means that calves - females and perhaps the males as well - remain with their mothers for life.

These groups have been observed socializing with common bottlenose dolphins, Atlantic white-sided dolphins and Risso's dolphins. Pilot whales mainly feed on cephalopods, though in certain regions fish may be more prominent in their diet. Northwestern Atlantic whales are thought to dine predominately on short-finned squid.

Long-finned pilot whales can often be seen lobtailing and spyhopping. Occasionally they may also breach. This species is notorious for mass strandings. During a specific time of year, approximately December to March, these whales beach themselves in high numbers along the coast of New Zealand. The reasons for stranding are not fully understood, but because pilot whales have strong social bonds, it is hypothesized that when one animal strands, the rest of the group may have the tendency to follow.

These whales have also been observed babysitting calves that are not their own, with one study showing that many of those doing the babysitting are males.

Long finned pilot whale calls
Songs of long-finned pilot whales. The cracking noise is caused by echolocation.

=== Communication ===
Long-finned pilot whales make many different kinds of sounds. In addition to squeaks, whistles, buzzes, and other calls likely used for communicative functions, they also produce rapid clicks that function as a type of bio sonar known as echolocation. This allows the whales to "see" in the murky, dark environments that they live in by listening to the nature of the echoes that return.

The whistles and pulsed calls that pilot whales make seem not to fall into distinct types, but rather can be arranged on a continuum. These calls are produced in a wide frequency range, which has been observed from less than 1 kHz to about 20 kHz.

Recent studies have found that a large portion of their vocal repertoire is made up of calls produced in repeated sequences. These repetitions are more commonly heard when whales are socializing than any other behavioral state (e.g. foraging, traveling, and resting).

=== Decision-making ===
During the deeper collective dives of groups of long-finned pilot whales, females on the right and left flanks (periphery) are found to lead most often. This may function in a similar fashion to what is observed in cattle drives, where flanking riders are important for maintaining cohesion of the herd of cattle. The study also found that both mature males and juveniles can lead these dives, but that they do so far less often.

=== Diet ===
Long-finned pilot whales are apex predators, preying on various species of squid, octopus, crustaceans and fish. Examples of fish species recorded as prey include lanternfish, Atlantic herring, silver hake, Atlantic mackerel and spiny dogfish.

=== Reproduction ===
Females reach sexual maturity at about 8 years of age, while males reach sexual maturity at around 12 years of age. It seems that mating can take place at any time during the year, but it peaks in late spring/early summer for both northern and southern hemisphere populations. Mating is thought to occur when different groups meet up, and breeding within units is a rare occurrence.

Gestation lasts approximately 12 to 16 months and calving occurs once every 3 to 6 years. Calves are generally 1.6–2.0 m (5 ft 3 in – 6 ft 7 in) at birth, and weigh about 75 kg (165 lb). Most calves are born in the summer, though some calving occurs throughout the year. There is evidence that some males may stay with their mothers after they reach sexual maturity.

=== Parasites ===
Among other parasites, long-finned pilot whales harbour Crassicauda carbonelli, a species of nematode which is found exclusively in the penis.

== Distribution and abundance ==
=== Abundance ===
Though long-finned pilot whales appear to be abundant, there have been no recent reliable estimates for the worldwide population and very little long-term baseline data collected for monitoring population trends. However, based on their apparent abundance and what information is available, they are currently listed by the IUCN as "Least Concern." Conservative estimates for the population found off Newfoundland estimated around 13,000 individuals. Another study estimated a total of 780,000 animals in the North Atlantic, though this study includes both short and long-finned pilot whales as they are hard to distinguish at sea.

=== Current distribution ===
Long-finned pilot whales are found in the North Atlantic (subspecies Globicephala melas melas), as well as the Southern Hemisphere (subspecies Globicephala melas edwardii). Those in the north are wide-ranging and have been observed off the coast of the eastern U.S. and Canada, across the Atlantic in places such as the Azores and the Faroe Islands, as well as down the western coast of Europe all the way to the Strait of Gibraltar and North Africa. In the southern ocean, long-finned pilot whales are thought to range from 19 to 60° S, but are commonly seen in the Antarctic Convergence Zone and other areas, showing that they go as far as 68° S. This species has been observed near sea ice in the Antarctic.

=== Historical distribution ===
Though there are only two recognized living subspecies, there was once a third that was found in the western North Pacific around Japan. These are thought to have died off sometime between the 8th and 12th centuries. This unnamed form was documented in historical literature and confirmed by the discovery of fossils in several locations of Japan, such as on Rebun Island and in Chiba Prefecture. Their biological niche after the extinction has likely been refilled by short-finned pilot whales, who are currently present in parts of this region.

== Antagonistic interactions with other species ==
Pilot whales have been occasionally observed harassing, mobbing or chasing other species of cetaceans.

=== Orcas ===
Chases of orcas have been documented in several parts of the world, including Iceland and the Strait of Gibraltar. It is thought that this might be due to either competition for prey or an anti-predation strategy by the long-finned pilot whales. Recently, an adult female Icelandic orca was observed with a newborn pilot whale travelling alongside her in a mother-calf position, leading to speculation that the relationship between both species might be far more complex than previously suggested. This same orca was seen a year later interacting with a larger group of pilot whales. Whether this newborn calf was adopted or abducted is unknown.

Based on experimentation involving familiar sounds of orcas that consume fish and unfamiliar vocalizations of mammal-hunting killer whales, one study suggests that long-finned pilot whales can distinguish between familiar and unaccustomed types of orca, noting behavioral differences like the ceasing of feeding when mammal-hunting orcas' sounds were played. The study suggests that antagonistic interactions against fish-eating killer whales could either be an anti-predatory behavior or an attempt to maintain territory, while actions done in response to mammal-hunting Killer Whales could be a response to a more dangerous threat.

== Strandings ==
=== Mass strandings ===
Long-finned pilot whales are the most common species involved in mass strandings. The largest event consisted of 1,000 whales on the Chatham Islands in 1918. Though mass strandings of this species are most common in New Zealand, pilot whales have beached themselves in many other countries in places such as northern Europe, the Atlantic coast of North America, South America, and southern parts of Africa.

Over 600 pilot whales were involved in a stranding at Farewell Spit, New Zealand on February 9, 2017. This was the second largest mass stranding event to be documented.

=== Research from strandings ===
Scientists have learned a number of important things from mass strandings of long-finned pilot whales around the world. Studies suggest that they do not always beach together in family units, as multiple matrilines can be found in a single stranding event.

== Conservation ==
=== Current conservation status ===
The North Sea and Baltic Sea populations of the long-finned pilot whale are listed on Appendix II of the Convention on the Conservation of Migratory Species of Wild Animals (CMS), since they have an unfavourable conservation status or would benefit significantly from international co-operation organised by tailored agreements.

The long-finned pilot whale is also covered by the Agreement on the Conservation of Small Cetaceans of the Baltic, North East Atlantic, Irish and North Seas (ASCOBANS), the Agreement on the Conservation of Cetaceans in the Black Sea, Mediterranean Sea and Contiguous Atlantic Area (ACCOBAMS), the Memorandum of Understanding for the Conservation of Cetaceans and Their Habitats in the Pacific Islands Region (Pacific Cetaceans MoU) and the Memorandum of Understanding Concerning the Conservation of the Manatee and Small Cetaceans of Western Africa and Macaronesia (Western African Aquatic Mammals MoU).

=== Whaling ===
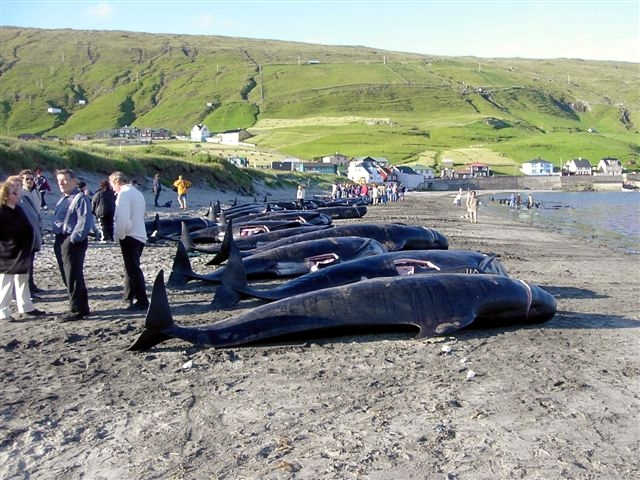
Killed pilot whales in Hvalba

Whaling of this species in the Faroe Islands in the North Atlantic has been practiced since the time of the first Norse settlements there. The hunts, called grindadráp in Faroese, are mainly executed during the summer. They are generally regarded as non-commercial - though people may sell their share after the catch has been divided - and organized on a community level. The hunters first surround the pilot whales with a wide semicircle of many boats. The boats then drive the pilot whales into a bay or to the bottom of a fjord. It is regulated by Faroese authorities but not by the International Whaling Commission, which does not regulate the hunts of small cetaceans. As of the end of November 2008 the chief medical officers of the Faroe Islands have recommended that pilot whales no longer be considered fit for human consumption because of the level of mercury in the whales.

Though the Faroe Islands are home to the only remaining large scale long-finned pilot whale hunts in the world, this species has also been hunted historically elsewhere. An industrial drive fishery was started in the Trinity Bay area of Newfoundland, Canada in 1947 by a Norwegian whaling captain. The catches increased every year until in 1956, there were approximately 10,000 pilot whales successfully captured and killed. This species was also historically hunted along the New England coastline.

Aside from the Faroe Islands, a few pilot whales are taken opportunistically in Greenland each year.

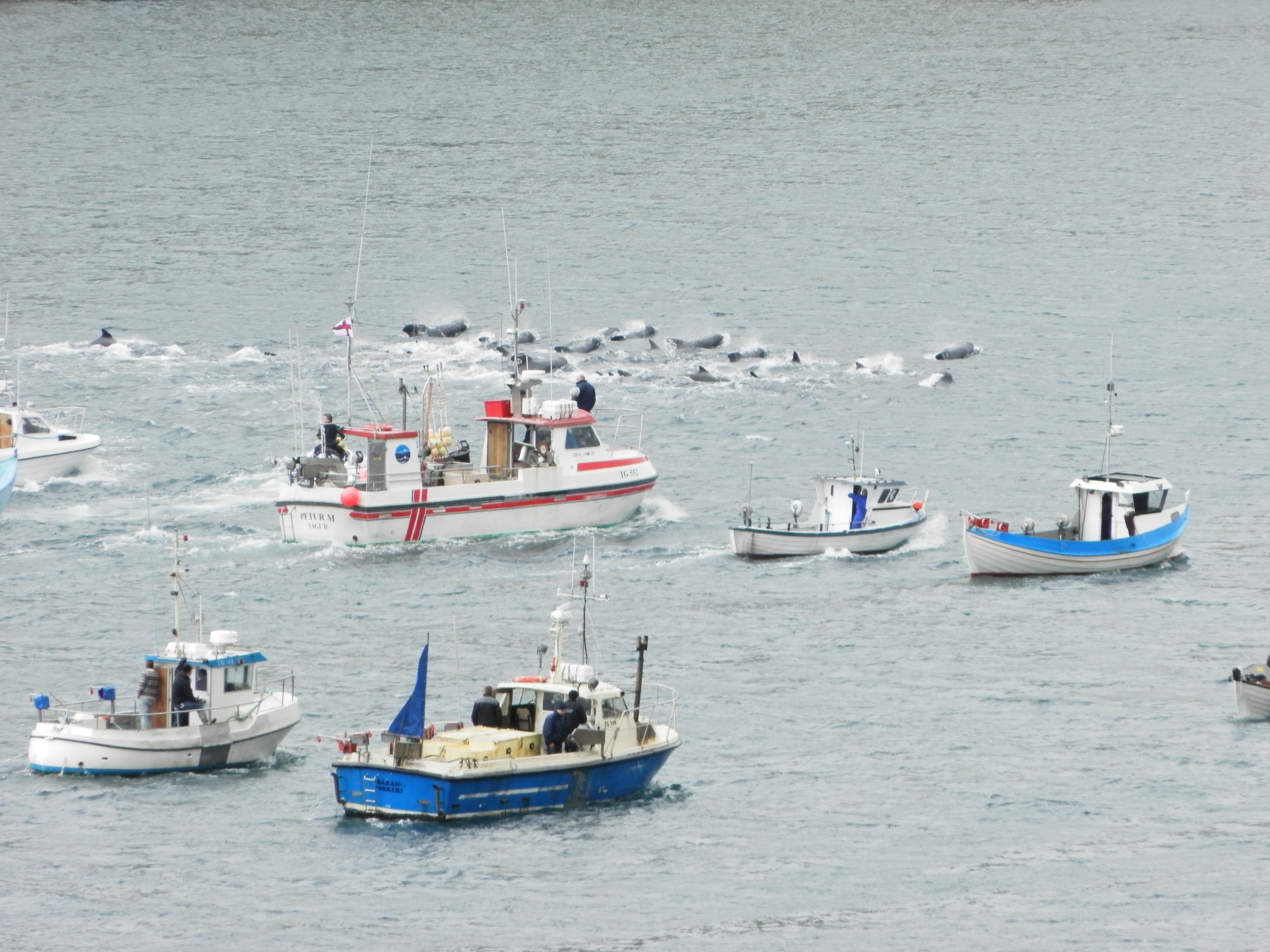
Pilot whale hunt in Vágur, Suðuroy in August 2012

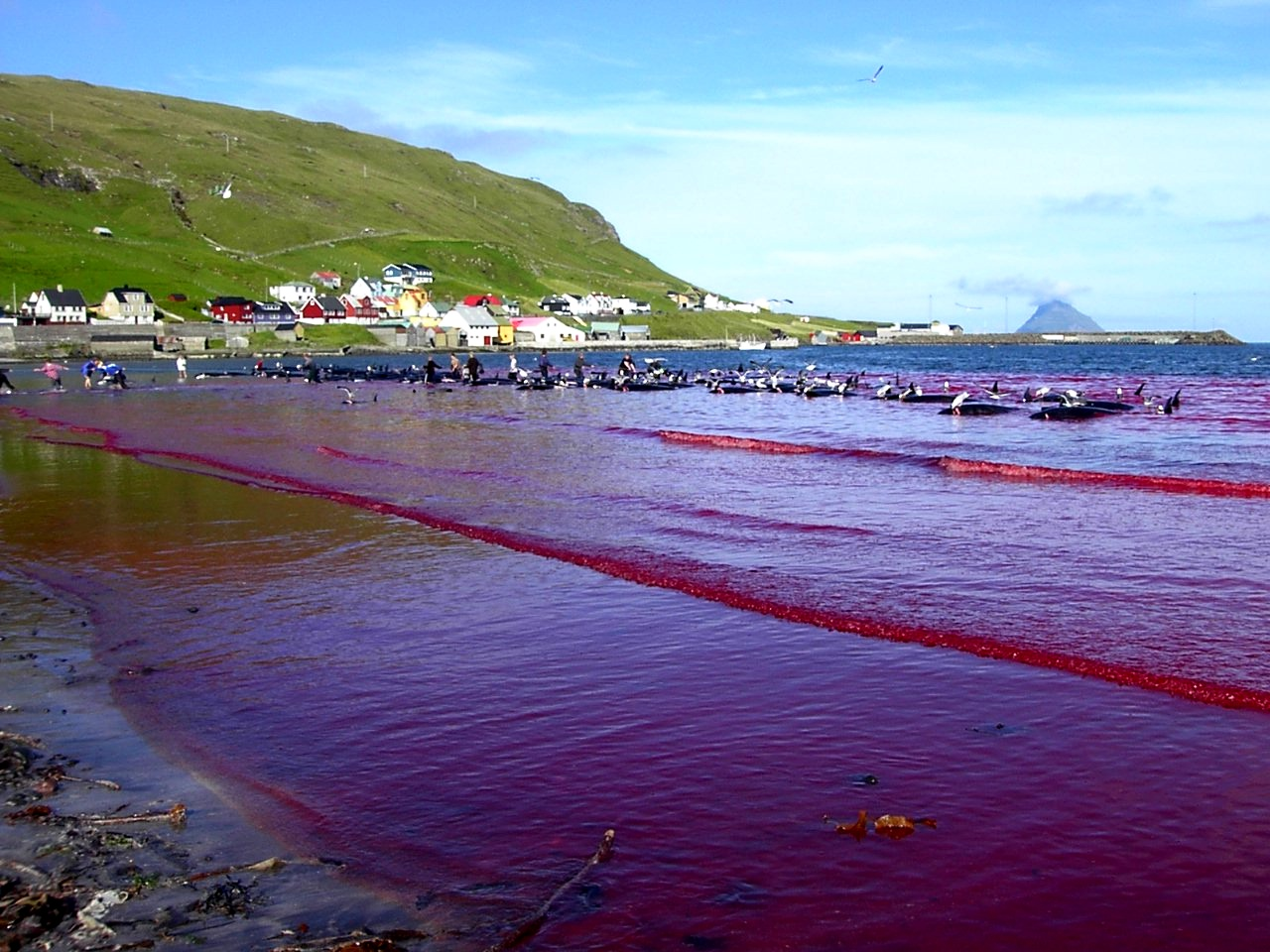
Beach of Hvalba during a Grindadráp, Faroe Islands, the sea has turned red with blood

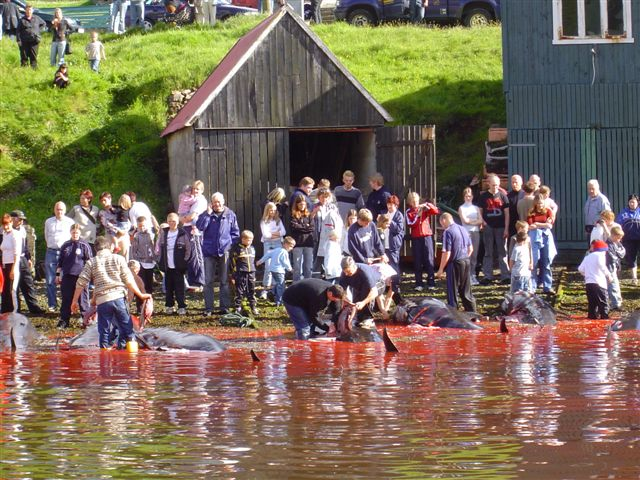
In accordance with the regulations, men and women gather on the shore to kill the beached whales, here in the town Vágur on Suðuroy

=== Tourism ===
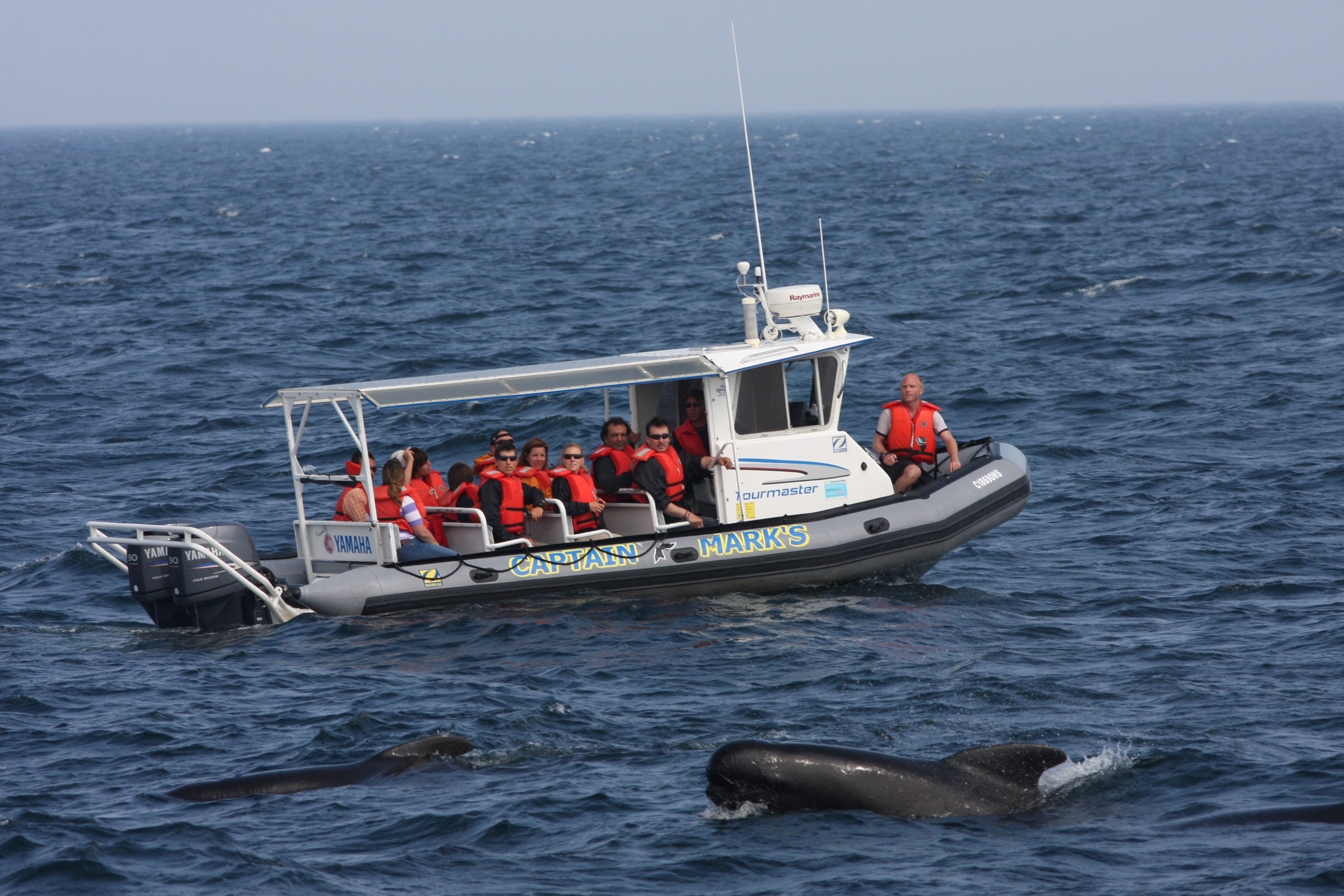
Whale-watching vessel and long-finned pilot whales off Cape Breton

Long-finned pilot whales are economically important in the whale-watching industry of some areas of the world, especially in eastern Canada. Even though there are a number of other species of whales found in the Gulf of St. Lawrence and around Newfoundland, pilots are one of the more common ones sighted inshore during the summer season. The tour vessels used in these regions are normally old converted fishing vessels or zodiacs. In these places, pilot whales provide valuable income for people living in rural fishing communities.

The effects of whale-watching on long-finned pilot whales have not been well studied.

== Museum specimens ==
The articulated skeleton of a long-finned pilot whale, killed in the Firth of Forth in 1867, was put on display at Leeds City Museum, UK in 2019.

== See also ==
- List of cetaceans
