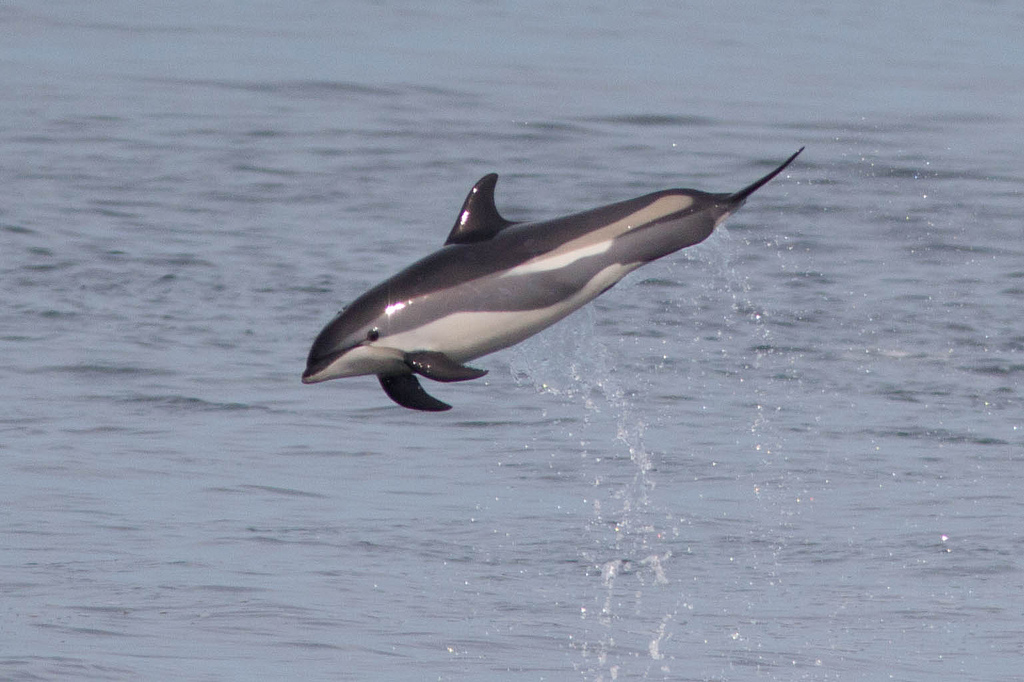

- Size compared to an average human

Conservation status
- Least Concern (IUCN 3.1)
- CITES Appendix II

Scientific classification
- Kingdom: Animalia
- Phylum: Chordata
- Class: Mammalia
- Infraclass: Placentalia
- Order: Artiodactyla
- Infraorder: Cetacea
- Family: Delphinidae
- Genus: Leucopleurus; Gray, 1866
- Species: L. acutus

Binomial name
- Leucopleurus acutus (Gray, 1828)
- Atlantic white-sided dolphin range

= Atlantic white-sided dolphin =

Species of mammal

The Atlantic white-sided dolphin (Lagenorhynchus acutus or Leucopleurus acutus) is a distinctively coloured dolphin found in the cool to temperate waters of the North Atlantic Ocean.

== Description ==
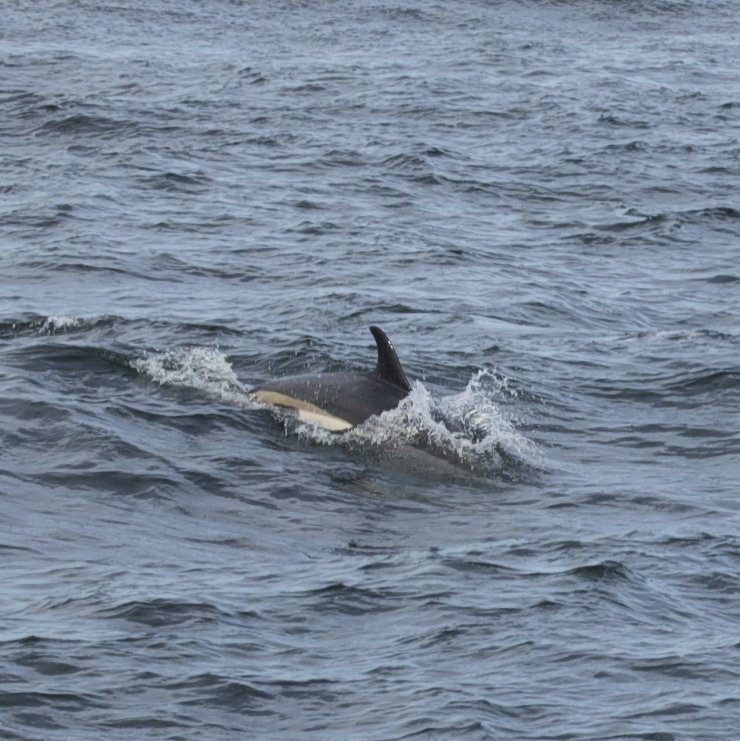
An Atlantic white-sided dolphin off the coast of Cape Ann, Massachusetts

The Atlantic white-sided dolphin is a relatively small dolphin. At birth, calves measure just over a meter long; adult males grow to about 2.8 m (9.2 ft), and females to about 2.5 m (8.2 ft), weighing between 180 and 230 kg (400- 510 lb) once fully grown. Females reach sexual maturity between the ages of 6 and 12 years, and males between 7 and 11 years old. The gestation period is 11 months and lactation lasts for about 18 months — both typical figures for dolphins. Atlantic white-sided dolphins are known to live for at least 17 years.

The key distinguishing feature is the dolphin's colouration—a white to pale-yellow patch is found behind the dorsal fin on both sides of the body. The white-sided dolphin's colour variations are unique amongst the standard hues of white, grey, black and blue seen on other pelagic cetaceans. Their body's colouration is well-demarcated, with the chin, throat and belly being white; the flippers, dorsal fin and back are dark-grey to black (with the exception of the yellow patch), and there is a further white patch below the dorsal fin (lying above a lighter, grayish stripe running from the beak, above the eye, down to the tail stock).

Dolphin pod sizes vary by location, with groups averaging 60 in number having been seen close to the Newfoundland coastline, but somewhat smaller east of Iceland. From the analysis of the stomach contents of stranded animals, fishes, such as herring and mackerel, and squid appear to be the species' main prey. The Atlantic white-sided dolphin is fairly acrobatic, and keen to interact with boats; however, it is not as wildly gregarious as the white-beaked, bottlenose or common dolphins.

== Geographic range and distribution ==
The species is endemic to the northern Atlantic Ocean. The distribution limits are the Norwegian Sea in the northeast, the Davis Strait in the northwest, coastal North Carolina in the southwest and the Celtic Sea in the southeast (with possible range extension south to the Azores). Areas of particularly high population density include the shores of Newfoundland and Cape Cod, the triangular area of sea between the United Kingdom, Iceland and Greenland and the northern North Sea. In 2008, sightings of Atlantic white-sided dolphins, as well as the melon-headed whale, were documented off South Carolina after a few strandings had taken place in the area at the time. Along the North American east coast the species tends to occur in continental shelf waters, around 100m in depth, and seem to show a preference toward areas of steep slopes and canyons. They are associated with the colder, slightly less saline waters in the northern Atlantic, compared to for example common dolphins that are found in warmer, slightly more saline waters of the North Atlantic, though it is unclear whether this is due to preferences or if these factors influence prey supply.

== Behaviour ==
=== Foraging ===
The diet of Atlantic white-sided dolphins mainly consists of herring, hake and squid. However, as opportunistic carnivores, they consume a large variety of prey, including smaller mackerel and various bottom-dwelling fish. They have been observed cooperatively hunting at the surface. It has been suggested that larger groups split while feeding.

=== Social behaviour ===
Like all species of the dolphin family, Atlantic white-sided dolphins are very social animals, often traveling in large pods and displaying aerial behaviors as they travel. The pod's size can vary, from several dozen to several hundred individuals, though the average size is around 50. However, studies have shown there to be little familial relation between members of a group, appearing more as a social pod traveling for "safety in numbers". Researchers in different parts of their range have found that individuals were, mostly, unrelated to one another. Juveniles spend at least some time in separate social groups, away from their parents, prior to weaning. Atlantic white-sided dolphins jump and breach more frequently when in larger groups, as this behaviour might have a social context. They have a wide vocal repertoire which includes squeals, whistles, clicks and buzzes. It is suggested that vocalisation is used for communication as noise production increases during socialising.

Despite being docile creatures, even known to interact with various species of cetacean in a nonviolent manner, most notably with the long-finned pilot whale (Globicephala melas), they have also been known to display violent behavior towards harbour porpoises, attacking them until they eventually succumb to their wounds (a similar behavior as observed in bottlenose dolphins).

=== Migration ===
Atlantic white-sided dolphins do not undertake specific seasonal migration. However, they do move within their home range following prey distribution. For example, in the waters off eastern North America this species moves southwards in winter and spring.

=== Reproduction ===
Most of the calves are born around June and July. The gestation period is 11 months and lactation around 18 months. The birth interval varies between 1–3 years.

Females reach sexual maturity around the age of 6–12 years. Males reach sexual maturity around 7–11 years. The reproduction is most likely seasonal, beginning in February, as some studies have identified dormant testes in some males.

== Taxonomy ==
3d model of skeleton

The Atlantic white-sided dolphin was named by John Edward Gray in 1828. The specific name acutus comes from the Latin for 'pointed' and refers to the sharply pointed dorsal fin. It was traditionally placed in the genus Lagenorhynchus, but there was consistent molecular evidence that supports the Atlantic white-sided dolphin and the white-beaked dolphin as basal members of the family Delphinidae and not closely related. In 2025 the Atlantic white-sided dolphin was therefore moved to its own genus, Leucopleurus.

== Population status ==
The estimations for the U.S. shelf and shelf-edge water suggest that the population size is about 300,000. Additional 120,000 individuals have been estimated to spend summer in the Gulf of St.Lawrence. In the eastern North America waters the numbers increase southwards in winter and spring in association with cold waters from the Gulf of Maine. Two projects attempted to estimate the population trends - multinational Small Cetacean Abundance in the North Sea and Adjacent Waters (SCANS) survey project and the North Atlantic Sightings Survey (NASS). SCANS surveys, however, failed to produce species specific estimation as it combined both white-sided and white-beaked dolphins. NASS surveys did not indicate any population trends.

== Threats ==
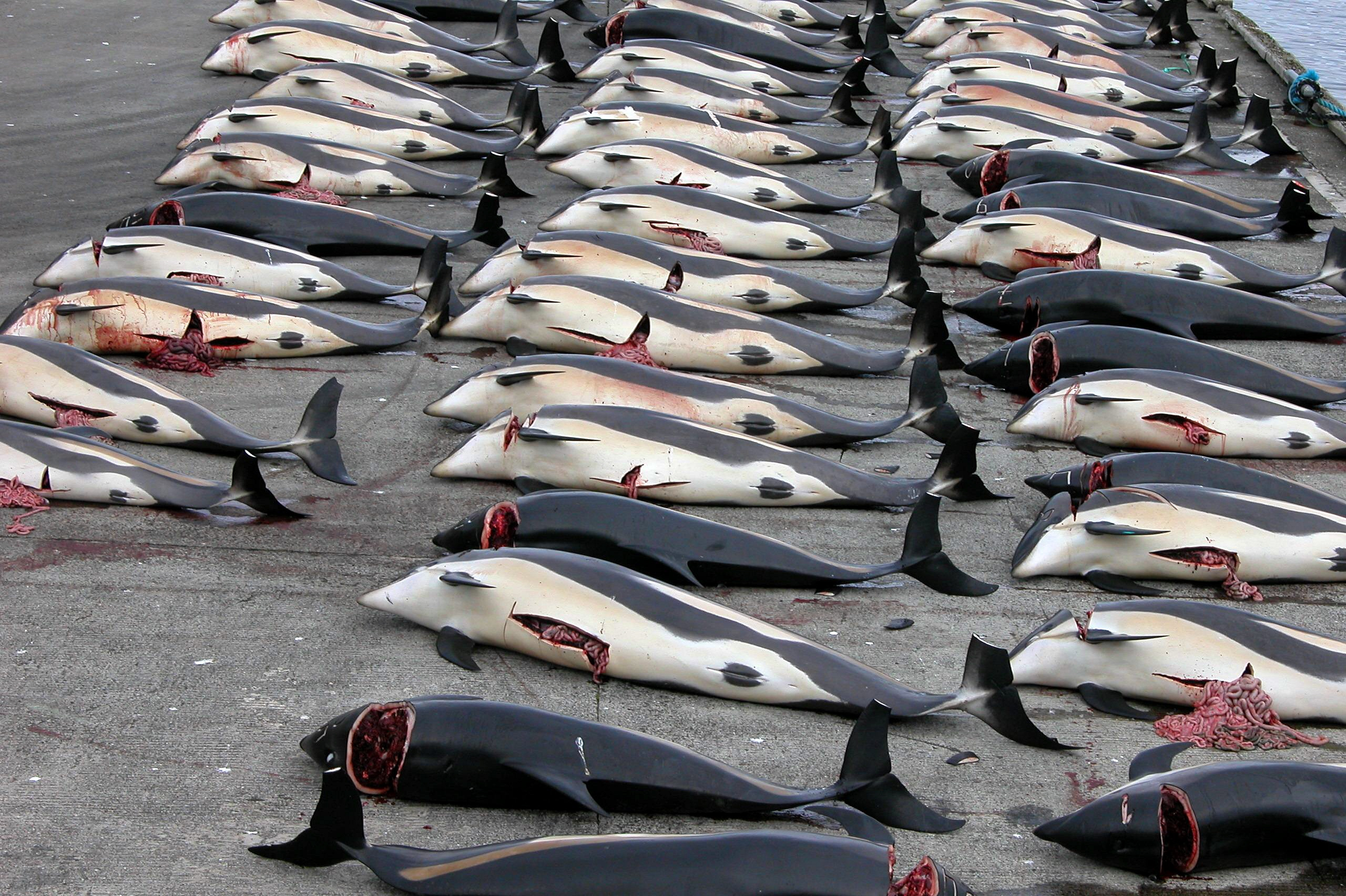
Hvalba, Faroe Islands in August 2006

=== Whaling ===
Historically, Atlantic white-sided dolphins were killed in drives conducted from Norway and Newfoundland. These have ceased in recent years, although they still occur to a lesser extent from the Faroe Islands, where the meat and blubber are in high regard as food. Reported catches in the years vary, though individual years suddenly stand out, such as in 2002, where the number reported killed was 773, and in 2017, when 488 were killed. In September 2021, a large pod of 1,428 animals was herded in Skálafjördur and killed.

Annual number taken of white-sided dolphin in the Faroe Islands in the period 1980-2009
Year	No/yr	drive/yr	Year	No/yr	drive/yr	Year	No/yr	drive/yr
1980	8	1	1993	377	6	2001	546	7
1983	10	1	1994	263	7	2002	773	10
1985	32	1	1995	157	4	2003	186	5
1986	185	4	1996	357	7	2004	333	5
1987	76	2	1997	350	10	2005	312	4
1988	603	4	1998	438	4	2006	622	8
1990	55	2	1998	438	4	2008	1	1
1992	47	3	2000	265	3	2009	171	5

=== Entanglement and by catch ===
Atlantic white-sided dolphins have also been killed in incidental catch situations in the fishing industry. Such occurrences have been reported in Canada, United States, United Kingdom and Ireland. Between 1977 and 1988, 13 Atlantic white-sided dolphins were reported as being incidentally caught in the Northeastern United States by U.S. fisheries observers, 11 of these in Mackerel fisheries. They have also been reported to get caught in pelagic or near surface trawl or drift nets.

=== Noise ===
Anthropogenic underwater noise is a potential disturbance to Atlantic white-sided dolphins as they use sounds to communicate and catch prey. A survey done in the UK showed that the sighting rate of Atlantic white-sided dolphins declined when airguns were firing compared to when they were not.

=== Pollution ===
Persistent organic pollutants (POPs) such as PCBs and organochlorine pesticides (e.g. DDT, DDE) and polybrominated diphenyl ether (PBDE) flame retardants have been identified in body tissues of Atlantic white-sided dolphins throughout their range. Males had higher levels of PCBs suggesting that females pass some of the contamination to offspring during lactation[30]. Similarly to other species, studies have identified heavy metals in Atlantic white-sided dolphins including cadmium levels higher than in other dolphin species in southern latitudes. The full effect of this contamination is currently unknown.

== Conservation status ==
The International Union of the Conservation of Nature (IUCN) currently classifies Atlantic white-sided dolphins as Least Concern.

The North and Baltic Sea populations of the Atlantic white-sided dolphin are listed on Appendix II of the Convention on the Conservation of Migratory Species of Wild Animals (CMS). They are listed on Appendix II as they have an unfavourable conservation status or would benefit significantly from international co-operation organised by tailored agreements. These species of dolphin are known to fall victims to in a polluted environment, a study from 1997 confirmed that the British and Irish populations of Atlantic white-sided dolphins to succumb to these effects.

In addition, the Atlantic white-sided dolphin is covered by the Agreement on the Conservation of Small Cetaceans of the Baltic, North East Atlantic, Irish and North Seas (ASCOBANS).

== See also ==
- List of cetaceans
- Marine biology
