= 176th meridian east =

Line of longitude

176th meridian east (interactive map)

The meridian 176° east of Greenwich is a line of longitude that extends from the North Pole across the Arctic Ocean, Asia, the Pacific Ocean, New Zealand, the Southern Ocean, and Antarctica to the South Pole.

The 176th meridian east forms a great circle with the 4th meridian west.

== From Pole to Pole ==
Starting at the North Pole and heading south to the South Pole, the 176th meridian east passes through:

Co-ordinates	Country, territory or sea	Notes
90°0′N 176°0′E	Arctic Ocean	
72°29′N 176°0′E	East Siberian Sea	
69°52′N 176°0′E	Russia	Chukotka Autonomous Okrug
62°15′N 176°0′E	Bering Sea	Passing just east of Buldir Island, Alaska, United States (at 52°21′N 175°58′E)
52°20′N 176°0′E	Pacific Ocean	
1°20′S 176°0′E	Kiribati	Beru Island
1°22′S 176°0′E	Pacific Ocean	Passing just east of the island of Tamana, Kiribati (at 2°31′S 175°59′E); Passing just west of the island of Nanumea, Tuvalu (at 5°39′S 176°4′E)
37°29′S 176°0′E	New Zealand	Matakana Island and North Island — passing through the country's largest lake, Lake Taupō (at 38°45′S 176°0′E)
41°10′S 176°0′E	Pacific Ocean	
60°0′S 176°0′E	Southern Ocean	
77°43′S 176°0′E	Antarctica	Ross Dependency — claimed by New Zealand

== See also ==
- 175th meridian east
- 177th meridian east
