= 4th meridian west =

Line of longitude

4th meridian west

The meridian 4° west of Greenwich is a line of longitude that extends from the North Pole across the Arctic Ocean, the Atlantic Ocean, Europe, Africa, the Southern Ocean, and Antarctica to the South Pole.

The 4th meridian west forms a great circle with the 176th meridian east.

== From Pole to Pole ==
Starting at the North Pole and heading south to the South Pole, the 4th meridian west passes through:

Co-ordinates	Country, territory or sea	Notes
90°0′N 4°0′W	Arctic Ocean	
81°52′N 4°0′W	Atlantic Ocean	
58°34′N 4°0′W	United Kingdom	Scotland
57°56′N 4°0′W	North Sea	Dornoch Firth
57°50′N 4°0′W	United Kingdom	Scotland
57°42′N 4°0′W	North Sea	Moray Firth
57°36′N 4°0′W	United Kingdom	Scotland — passing through Motherwell, just east of Glasgow (at 55°48′N 4°0′W)
54°46′N 4°0′W	Irish Sea	
53°15′N 4°0′W	United Kingdom	Wales — passing just west of Swansea (at 51°38′N 3°57′W)
51°54′N 4°0′W	Bristol Channel	
51°13′N 4°0′W	United Kingdom	England — passing just east of Plymouth (at 50°22′N 4°9′W)
50°18′N 4°0′W	Atlantic Ocean	English Channel
48°43′N 4°0′W	France	
47°51′N 4°0′W	Atlantic Ocean	Bay of Biscay
43°27′N 4°0′W	Spain	
36°45′N 4°0′W	Mediterranean Sea	Alboran Sea
35°14′N 4°0′W	Morocco	
30°51′N 4°0′W	Algeria	
24°28′N 4°0′W	Mali	
13°26′N 4°0′W	Burkina Faso	
9°50′N 4°0′W	Ivory Coast	Passing just east of Abidjan (at 5°19′N 4°2′W)
5°14′N 4°0′W	Atlantic Ocean	
60°0′S 4°0′W	Southern Ocean	
70°19′S 4°0′W	Antarctica	Queen Maud Land — claimed by Norway

== See also ==
- 3rd meridian west
- 5th meridian west
