= 5th meridian west =

Line of longitude

5th meridian west

The meridian 5° west of Greenwich is a line of longitude that extends from the North Pole across the Arctic Ocean, the Atlantic Ocean, Europe, Africa, the Southern Ocean, and Antarctica to the South Pole.

The 5th meridian west forms a great circle with the 175th meridian east.

== From Pole to Pole ==
Starting at the North Pole and heading south to the South Pole, the 5th meridian west passes through:

Co-ordinates	Country, territory or sea	Notes
90°0′N 5°0′W	Arctic Ocean	
81°55′N 5°0′W	Atlantic Ocean	
58°38′N 5°0′W	United Kingdom	Scotland
55°52′N 5°0′W	Firth of Clyde	Passing between the Isle of Bute and The Cumbraes, Scotland, United Kingdom (at 55°46′N 5°0′W); Passing just east of the Isle of Arran, Scotland, United Kingdom (at 55°33′N 5°5′W)
55°7′N 5°0′W	United Kingdom	Scotland — passing just east of Stranraer (at 54°54′N 5°1′W)
54°45′N 5°0′W	Irish Sea	Passing just west of the Calf of Man, Isle of Man (at 54°3′N 4°49′W); Passing just west of Bardsey Island, Wales, United Kingdom (at 52°45′N 4°48′W)
52°1′N 5°0′W	United Kingdom	Wales — passing just west of Haverfordwest (at 51°48′N 4°58′W)
51°37′N 5°0′W	Celtic Sea	
50°32′N 5°0′W	United Kingdom	England — passing just east of Truro (at 50°16′N 5°3′W)
50°9′N 5°0′W	Atlantic Ocean	English Channel; Passing just east of the island of Ushant, France (at 48°28′N 5°2′W); Iroise Sea; Bay of Biscay — from 47°7′N 5°0′W
43°28′N 5°0′W	Spain	
36°28′N 5°0′W	Mediterranean Sea	Alboran Sea
35°24′N 5°0′W	Morocco	Passing through Fez (at 34°2′N 5°0′W)
30°10′N 5°0′W	Algeria	
25°6′N 5°0′W	Mauritania	For about 12 km
25°0′N 5°0′W	Mali	
11°59′N 5°0′W	Burkina Faso	
10°4′N 5°0′W	Ivory Coast	
5°8′N 5°0′W	Atlantic Ocean	
60°0′S 5°0′W	Southern Ocean	
70°21′S 5°0′W	Antarctica	Queen Maud Land — claimed by Norway

== See also ==
- 4th meridian west
- 6th meridian west
