= 174th meridian east =

Line of longitude

174th meridian east

The meridian 174° east of Greenwich is a line of longitude that extends from the North Pole across the Arctic Ocean, Asia, the Pacific Ocean, New Zealand, the Southern Ocean, and Antarctica to the South Pole.

The 174th meridian east forms a great circle with the 6th meridian west.

== From Pole to Pole ==
Starting at the North Pole and heading south to the South Pole, the 174th meridian east passes through:

| Co-ordinates | Country, territory or sea | Notes |
|---|---|---|
| 90°0′N 174°0′E | Arctic Ocean | |
| 72°58′N 174°0′E | East Siberian Sea | |
| 69°51′N 174°0′E | Russia | Chukotka Autonomous Okrug; Kamchatka Krai — from 62°27′N 174°0′E |
| 61°42′N 174°0′E | Bering Sea | |
| 52°44′N 174°0′E | United States | Alaska — Nizki Island |
| 52°43′N 174°0′E | Pacific Ocean | Passing just east of Abemama atoll, Kiribati (at 0°20′N 173°57′E) |
| 35°7′S 174°0′E | New Zealand | North Island — North Auckland Peninsula |
| 36°16′S 174°0′E | Pacific Ocean | |
| 39°5′S 174°0′E | New Zealand | North Island — passing just west of the city of New Plymouth (at 39°4′S 174°4′E) |
| 39°33′S 174°0′E | Pacific Ocean | |
| 40°55′S 174°0′E | New Zealand | South Island — passing just east of the town of Blenheim (at 4°31′S 173°58′E) |
| 42°0′S 174°0′E | Pacific Ocean | |
| 60°0′S 174°0′E | Southern Ocean | |
| 77°34′S 174°0′E | Antarctica | Ross Dependency — claimed by New Zealand |

== See also ==
- 173rd meridian east
- 175th meridian east
