= 173rd meridian east =

Line of longitude

173rd meridian east

The meridian 173° east of Greenwich is a line of longitude that extends from the North Pole across the Arctic Ocean, Asia, the Pacific Ocean, New Zealand, the Southern Ocean, and Antarctica to the South Pole.

The 173rd meridian east forms a great circle with the 7th meridian west.

== From Pole to Pole ==
Starting at the North Pole and heading south to the South Pole, the 173rd meridian east passes through:

Co-ordinates	Country, territory or sea	Notes
90°0′N 173°0′E	Arctic Ocean	
73°12′N 173°0′E	East Siberian Sea	
69°52′N 173°0′E	Russia	Chukotka Autonomous Okrug; Kamchatka Krai — from 62°23′N 173°0′E
61°25′N 173°0′E	Bering Sea	
52°59′N 173°0′E	United States	Alaska — Attu Island
52°47′N 173°0′E	Pacific Ocean	
3°24′N 173°0′E	Kiribati	Makin Islands
3°23′N 173°0′E	Pacific Ocean	Passing just east of Butaritari atoll, Kiribati (at 3°10′N 172°58′E)
1°52′N 173°0′E	Kiribati	Abaiang and Tarawa atolls
1°19′N 173°0′E	Pacific Ocean	
1°1′N 173°0′E	Kiribati	Maiana atoll
0°50′N 173°0′E	Pacific Ocean	
34°23′S 173°0′E	New Zealand	North Island — North Auckland Peninsula, passing close by the island's northernmost point, the Surville Cliffs
34°48′S 173°0′E	Pacific Ocean	
40°48′S 173°0′E	New Zealand	South Island
43°4′S 173°0′E	Pacific Ocean	Pegasus Bay
43°39′S 173°0′E	New Zealand	South Island — Banks Peninsula
43°53′S 173°0′E	Pacific Ocean	
60°0′S 173°0′E	Southern Ocean	
77°30′S 173°0′E	Antarctica	Ross Dependency, claimed by New Zealand

== See also ==
- 172nd meridian east
- 174th meridian east
