= 6th meridian west =

Line of longitude

6th meridian west

The meridian 6° west of Greenwich is a line of longitude that extends from the North Pole across the Arctic Ocean, the Atlantic Ocean, Europe, Africa, the Southern Ocean, and Antarctica to the South Pole.

The 6th meridian west forms a great circle with the 174th meridian east.

== From Pole to Pole ==
Starting at the North Pole and heading south to the South Pole, the 6th meridian west passes through:

Co-ordinates	Country, territory or sea	Notes
90°0′N 6°0′W	Arctic Ocean	
81°58′N 6°0′W	Atlantic Ocean	Passing just east of the island of Fugloy, Faroe Islands (at 62°20′N 6°15′W); Passing just east of the island of Svínoy, Faroe Islands (at 62°17′N 6°17′W); Passing just west of the island of North Rona, Scotland, United Kingdom (at 59°7′N 5°50′W); Passing just east of the island of Sula Sgeir, Scotland, United Kingdom (at 59°6′N 6°9′W)
58°32′N 6°0′W	The Minch	Passing just east of the isle of Lewis, Scotland, United Kingdom (at 58°15′N 6°8′W)
57°33′N 6°0′W	United Kingdom	Scotland — islands of South Rona, Raasay, Scalpay, Skye
57°1′N 6°0′W	Atlantic Ocean	Sea of the Hebrides
56°46′N 6°0′W	United Kingdom	Scotland — peninsulas of Ardnamurchan and Morvern, and the Isle of Mull
56°19′N 6°0′W	Atlantic Ocean	Firth of Lorn
55°59′N 6°0′W	United Kingdom	Scotland — island of Jura
55°48′N 6°0′W	Atlantic Ocean	Sound of Jura — passing just east of the island of Islay, Scotland, United Kingdom (at 55°41′N 6°2′W); North Channel — passing just east of Rathlin Island, Northern Ireland, United Kingdom (at 55°18′N 6°10′W)
55°3′N 6°0′W	United Kingdom	Northern Ireland — passing just west of Belfast (at 54°36′N 5°56′W)
54°3′N 6°0′W	Irish Sea	Passing just east of Lambay Island, Ireland (at 53°29′N 6°0′W); Passing just east of Howth Head, Ireland (at 53°23′N 6°3′W near Dublin); Passing just east of Wicklow Head, Ireland (at 52°58′N 6°0′W)
51°56′N 6°0′W	Atlantic Ocean	Celtic Sea — passing just west of Land's End, England, United Kingdom (at 50°4′N 5°43′W) — passing just east of the Isles of Scilly, England, United Kingdom (at 49°57′N 6°16′W) through an unnamed part of the ocean — from 46°42′N 6°0′W and into the Bay of Biscay — from 45°59′N 6°0′W
43°35′N 6°0′W	Spain	Passing just west of Seville (at 37°23′N 5°59′W)
36°11′N 6°0′W	Atlantic Ocean	
35°34′N 6°0′W	Morocco	
29°45′N 6°0′W	Algeria	
25°44′N 6°0′W	Mauritania	
25°0′N 6°0′W	Mali	
20°5′N 6°0′W	Mauritania	
15°30′N 6°0′W	Mali	
10°13′N 6°0′W	Ivory Coast	
4°58′N 6°0′W	Atlantic Ocean	Passing just west of the island of Saint Helena, Ascension and Tristan da Cunha (at 15°59′S 5°47′W)
60°0′S 6°0′W	Southern Ocean	
70°24′S 6°0′W	Antarctica	Queen Maud Land, claimed by Norway

== See also ==
- 5th meridian west
- 7th meridian west
