= 7th meridian west =

Line of longitude

7th meridian west

The meridian 7° west of Greenwich is a line of longitude that extends from the North Pole across the Arctic Ocean, the Atlantic Ocean, Europe, Africa, the Southern Ocean, and Antarctica to the South Pole.

The 7th meridian west forms a great circle with the 173rd meridian east.

== From Pole to Pole ==
Starting at the North Pole and heading south to the South Pole, the 7th meridian west passes through:

Co-ordinates	Country, territory or sea	Notes
90°0′N 7°0′W	Arctic Ocean	
82°2′N 7°0′W	Atlantic Ocean	
62°20′N 7°0′W	Faroe Islands	Islands of Eysturoy, Streymoy and Koltur
62°5′N 7°0′W	Atlantic Ocean	Passing just west of the island of Sandoy, Faroe Islands (at 61°55′N 6°56′W); Passing just west of the island of Suðuroy, Faroe Islands (at 61°38′N 7°0′W)
58°14′N 7°0′W	United Kingdom	Scotland - Islands of Lewis, Taransay and Harris
57°45′N 7°0′W	Atlantic Ocean	Little Minch; Sea of the Hebrides — from about 57°55′N 7°0′W passing just west of the island of Tiree, Scotland, United Kingdom (at 56°30′N 6°59′W) and into an unnamed part of the ocean — from 56°30′N 7°0′W
55°16′N 7°0′W	Ireland	Inishowen peninsula
55°12′N 7°0′W	Lough Foyle	
55°6′N 7°0′W	United Kingdom	Northern Ireland
54°24′N 7°0′W	Ireland	
52°8′N 7°0′W	Atlantic Ocean	Celtic Sea an unnamed part of the ocean — from 47°9′N 7°0′W; Bay of Biscay — from 44°50′N 7°0′W
43°33′N 7°0′W	Spain	
41°57′N 7°0′W	Portugal	
40°14′N 7°0′W	Spain	For about 11 km
40°7′N 7°0′W	Portugal	
39°42′N 7°0′W	Spain	
39°5′N 7°0′W	Portugal	
38°58′N 7°0′W	Spain	
38°12′N 7°0′W	Portugal	
38°1′N 7°0′W	Spain	
37°11′N 7°0′W	Atlantic Ocean	
33°54′N 7°0′W	Morocco	Passing just west of Rabat (at 34°1′N 6°50′W)
29°39′N 7°0′W	Algeria	
26°20′N 7°0′W	Mauritania	
15°30′N 7°0′W	Mali	
10°11′N 7°0′W	Ivory Coast	
4°34′N 7°0′W	Atlantic Ocean	
60°0′S 7°0′W	Southern Ocean	
70°24′S 7°0′W	Antarctica	Queen Maud Land, claimed by Norway

== See also ==
- 6th meridian west
- 8th meridian west
