= 175th meridian east =

Line of longitude

175th meridian east

The meridian 175° east of Greenwich is a line of longitude that extends from the North Pole across the Arctic Ocean, Asia, the Pacific Ocean, New Zealand, the Southern Ocean, and Antarctica to the South Pole.

The 175th meridian east forms a great circle with the 5th meridian west.

== From Pole to Pole ==
Starting at the North Pole and heading south to the South Pole, the 175th meridian east passes through:

| Co-ordinates | Country, territory or sea | Notes |
|---|---|---|
| 90°0′N 175°0′E | Arctic Ocean | |
| 72°44′N 175°0′E | East Siberian Sea | |
| 69°50′N 175°0′E | Russia | Chukotka Autonomous Okrug |
| 61°58′N 175°0′E | Bering Sea | |
| 52°30′N 175°0′E | Pacific Ocean | |
| 1°27′S 175°0′E | Kiribati | Tabiteuea Atoll |
| 1°28′S 175°0′E | Pacific Ocean | Passing just west of Little Barrier Island, New Zealand (at 36°11′S 175°2′E) |
| 36°46′S 175°0′E | New Zealand | Waiheke Island and North Island — passing just west of the city of Wanganui (at 39°56′S 175°2′E) |
| 39°57′S 175°0′E | Pacific Ocean | |
| 40°53′S 175°0′E | New Zealand | North Island — passing just west of the city of Upper Hutt (at 41°8′S 175°1′E) |
| 41°23′S 175°0′E | Pacific Ocean | |
| 60°0′S 175°0′E | Southern Ocean | |
| 77°40′S 175°0′E | Antarctica | Ross Dependency — claimed by New Zealand |

== See also ==
- 174th meridian east
- 176th meridian east
