= 166th =

166th is the ordinal form of the number 166. 166th or One hundred and sixty-sixth may also refer to:

- A fraction, 1/166, equal to one of 166 equal parts

== Geography ==
- 166th meridian east, a line of longitude
- 166th meridian west, a line of longitude

== Military ==
- 166th Brigade (disambiguation)
- 166th Division (2nd Formation) (People's Republic of China)
- 166th Rifle Division, Red Army
- 166th Regiment (disambiguation)

== See also ==
- June 15, 166th day of the year in a standard year
