= 167th =

167th is the ordinal form of the number 167. 167th or One hundred and sixty-secenth may also refer to:

- A fraction, 1/167, equal to one of 167 equal parts

== Geography ==
- 167th meridian east, a line of longitude
- 167th meridian west, a line of longitude
- 167th Street (disambiguation)

== Military ==
- 167th Brigade (disambiguation)
- 167th Rifle Division, Red Army
- 167th Volksgrenadier Division, German Army
- 167th Regiment (disambiguation)

== See also ==
- June 16, 167th day of the year in a standard year
