= 167th meridian =

167th meridian may refer to:

- 167th meridian east, a line of longitude east of the Greenwich Meridian
- 167th meridian west, a line of longitude west of the Greenwich Meridian

167th meridian west	167th meridian east
