= 166th Division =

166th Division may refer to:

- 166th Division (1st Formation) (People's Republic of China), 1948–1949
- 166th Division (2nd Formation) (People's Republic of China), 1951–1952
- 166th Infantry Division (Wehrmacht), Germany
- 166th Rifle Division, Soviet Union

== See also ==
- List of military divisions by number
- 166th Brigade (disambiguation)
- 166th Regiment (disambiguation)
- 166th Squadron (disambiguation)
- 166th (disambiguation)
