= 14th meridian =

14th meridian may refer to:

- 14th meridian east, a line of longitude east of the Greenwich Meridian
- 14th meridian west, a line of longitude west of the Greenwich Meridian
