= 13th meridian =

13th meridian may refer to:

- 13th meridian east, a line of longitude east of the Greenwich Meridian
- 13th meridian west, a line of longitude west of the Greenwich Meridian
