= 166th meridian =

166th meridian may refer to:

- 166th meridian east, a line of longitude east of the Greenwich Meridian
- 166th meridian west, a line of longitude west of the Greenwich Meridian

166th meridian west	166th meridian east
