= 168th meridian =

168th meridian may refer to:

- 168th meridian east, a line of longitude east of the Greenwich Meridian
- 168th meridian west, a line of longitude west of the Greenwich Meridian

168th meridian west	168th meridian east
