= Røst Municipality =

Municipality in Nordland, Norway

Røst Municipality Røst kommune
- Municipality
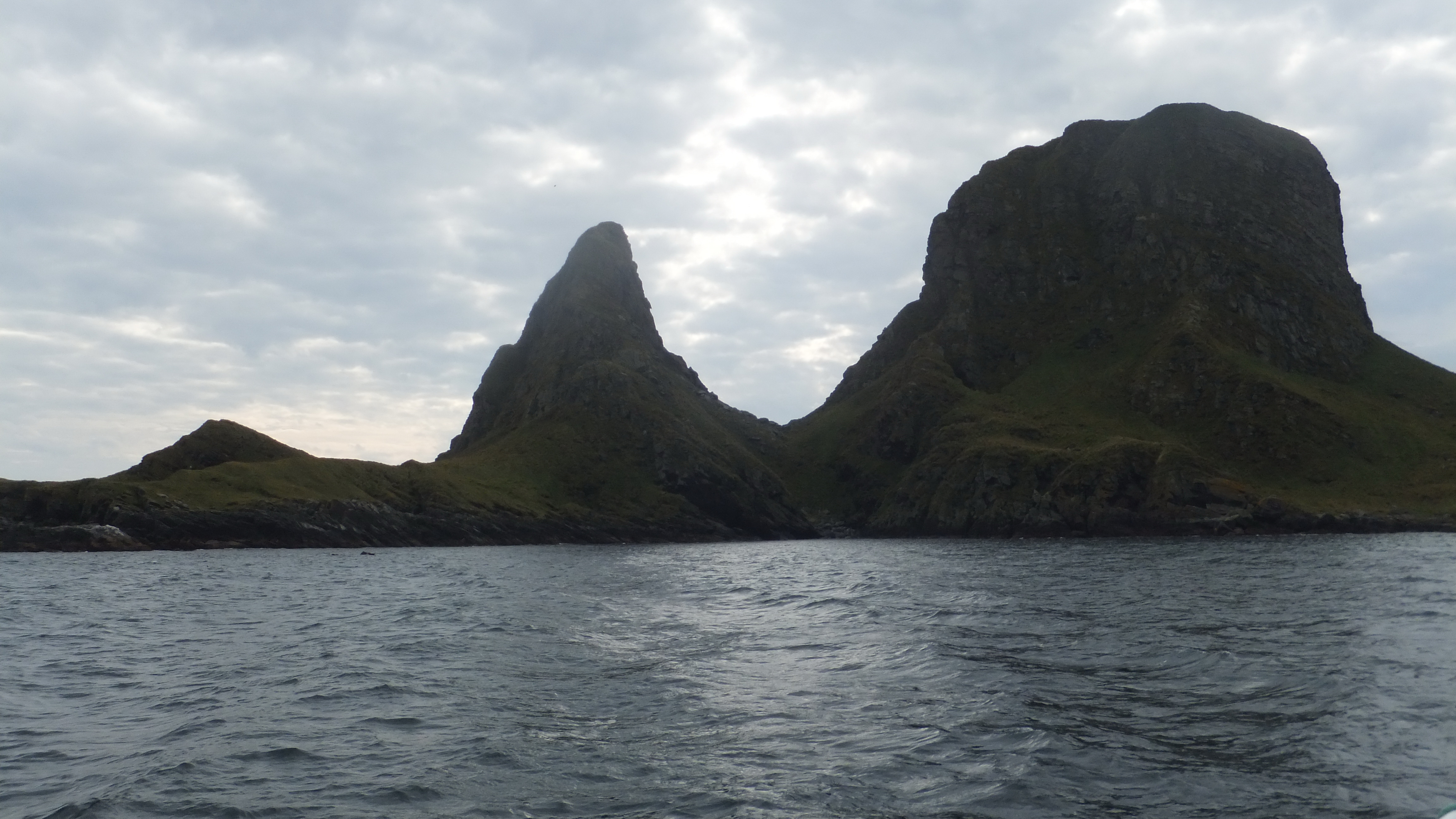
- Trenyken island in Røst

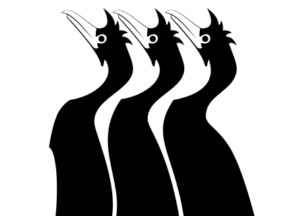
- Flag Coat of arms

- Nordland within Norway

- Røst within Nordland
- Coordinates: 67°31′12″N 12°05′56″E
- Country: Norway
- County: Nordland
- District: Lofoten
- Established: 1 July 1928
  - Preceded by: Værøy Municipality
- Administrative centre: Røstlandet

Government
  - Mayor (2019): Elisabeth Mikalsen (Sp)

Area
  - Total: 10.11 km^{2} (3.90 sq mi)
  - Land: 9.77 km^{2} (3.77 sq mi)
  - Water: 0.34 km^{2} (0.13 sq mi) 3.4%
  - Rank: #354 in Norway
- Highest elevation: 259.23 m (850.5 ft)

Population (2024)
  - Total: 460
  - Rank: #353 in Norway
  - Density: 45.5/km^{2} (118/sq mi)
  - Change (10 years): ▼ −18.7%
- Demonym: Røstværing

Official language
  - Norwegian form: Bokmål
- Time zone: UTC+01:00 (CET)
  - Summer (DST): UTC+02:00 (CEST)
- ISO 3166 code: NO-1856
- Website: Official website

Røst is a small island municipality in Nordland county, Norway. It is part of the traditional district of Lofoten. The administrative centre of the municipality is the village of Røstlandet on the island of Røstlandet.

The island municipality is very small and is essentially a large fishing village centered around Røstlandet. Many of the residents are involved in the fishing industry or support the industry. There are six fish farms in Røst. During the main fishing season, there can be up to 600 fishing boats based out of Røst.

The 10-square-kilometre (3 3/4 sq mi) municipality is the 354th largest by area out of the 357 municipalities in Norway. Røst Municipality is the 353rd most populous municipality in Norway with a population of 460. The municipality's population density is 45.5 inhabitants per square kilometre (118/sq mi), and its population has decreased by 18.7% over the previous 10-year period.

== General information ==
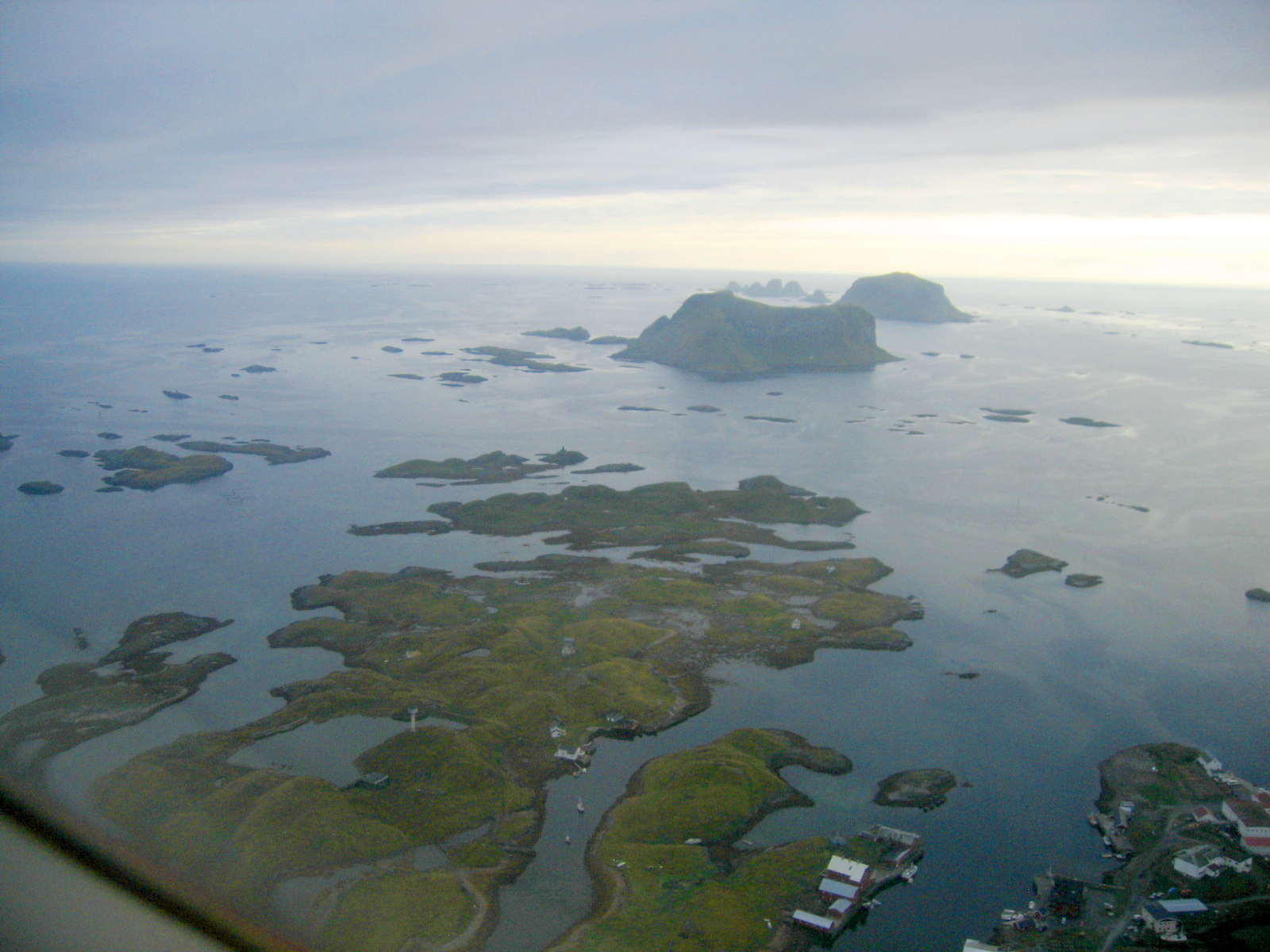
View of Røst from the air

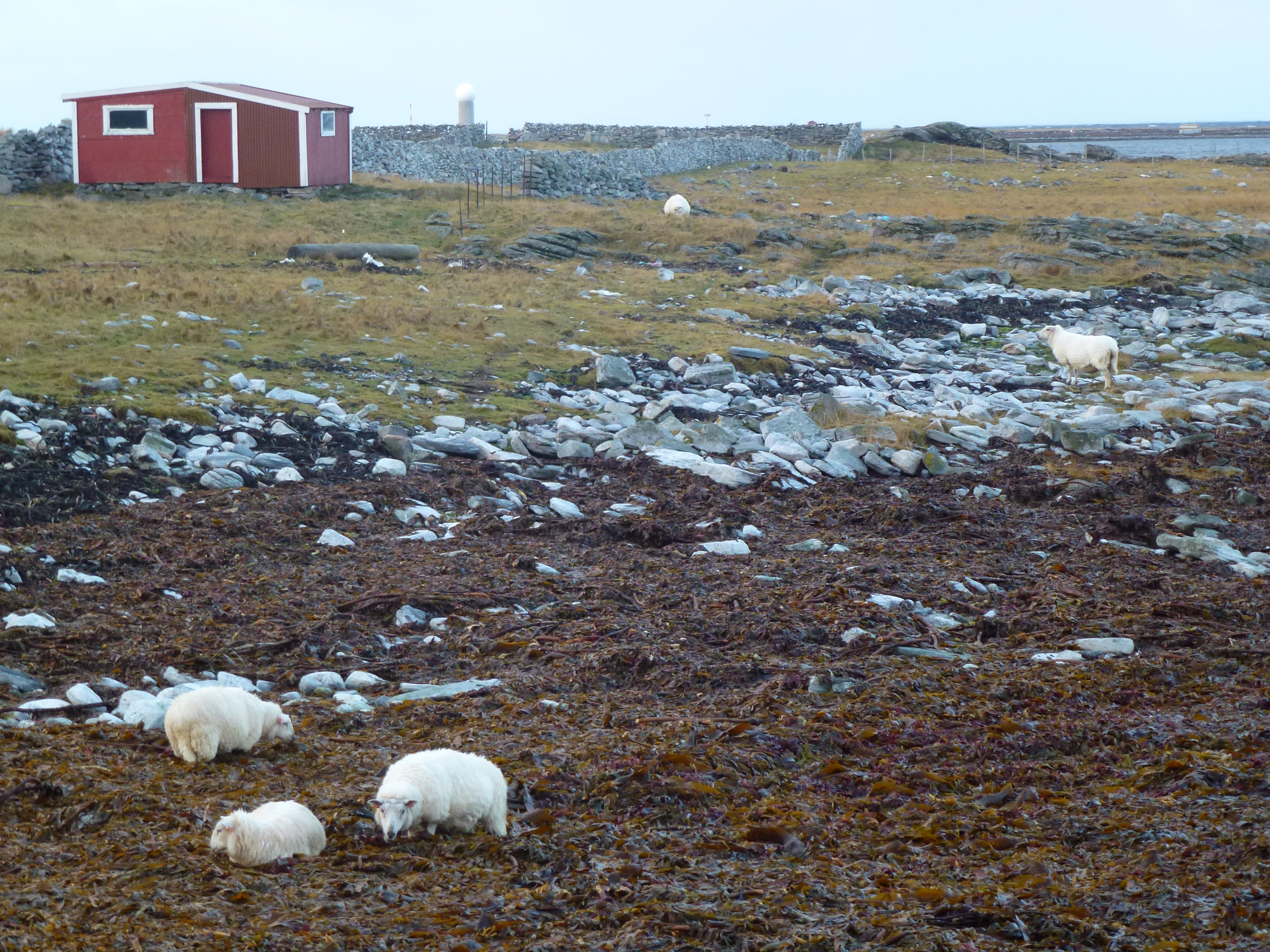
View of sheep eating seaweed in the tidal zone

The municipality of Røst was established on 1 July 1928 when it was separated from Værøy Municipality. Initially, it had 731 residents. The municipal boundaries have not changed since that time.

=== Name ===
The municipality (originally the parish) is named after the main island of Røstlandet (Old Norse: Rǫst) since the first Rost Church was built there. The name is identical to the Old Norse word rǫst which means "maelstrom", likely referring to the nearby Moskenstraumen.

=== Coat of arms ===
The coat of arms was granted on 28 November 1986. The official blazon is "Argent, three cormorants issuant from the base sable" (Norwegian: I sølv tre oppvoksende svarte skarver). This means the arms have a field (background) that has a tincture of argent which means it is commonly colored white, but if it is made out of metal, then silver is used. The charge is three black European shags (Gulosus aristotelis), which is a species of cormorant. The design was chosen to symbolize a local legend of three brothers who could transform themselves into cormorants. This story was recounted by Asbjørnsen and Moe, the famous collectors of Norwegian folklore. The arms were designed by Hans Arne Ingolf Hanssen.

=== Churches ===
The Church of Norway has one parish (sokn) within Røst Municipality. It is part of the Bodø domprosti (arch-deanery) in the Diocese of Sør-Hålogaland.

Churches in Røst Municipality
Parish (sokn)	Church name	Location of the church	Year built
Røst	Røst Church	Røstlandet	1899

== History ==
A vivid description of medieval island life has been delivered by the shipwrecked Venetian sea captain Pietro Querini, who was rescued by the islanders in 1432. He described the society as very harmonious and pious, and described how they made a living from fishing cod and some agriculture. The Norwegian Lundehund originated from this part of Norway, where it natively would have climbed along cliff paths to hunt puffins. Fishing is the main economic activity on Røst.

== Culture ==
The island has a rich cultural life. Every year in June there is a popular festival in honor of the puffin (Lundefestivalen).

=== Querini opera ===
In 2012, the Querini Opera was shown on Røst for the first time, telling the dramatic story about Pietro Querini who shipwrecked on Røst in 1432. The show was a great success and was shown again in 2014.

==== Literary Park Pietro Querini ====
In 2017, the Pietro Querini Literary Park (litteraturpark på Røst) was established with the Municipality of Røst, the Dante Committee, I Parchi Letterari Network and the support of the Embassy of Italy. The park started its activity in 2018. https://www.parchiletterari.com/parchi/pietro-querini-063/vita.php

== Government ==
Røst Municipality is responsible for primary education (through 10th grade), outpatient health services, senior citizen services, welfare and other social services, zoning, economic development, and municipal roads and utilities. The municipality is governed by a municipal council of directly elected representatives. The mayor is indirectly elected by a vote of the municipal council. The municipality is under the jurisdiction of the Salten og Lofoten District Court and the Hålogaland Court of Appeal.

=== Municipal council ===
The municipal council (Kommunestyre) of Røst Municipality is made up of 11 representatives that are elected to four year terms. The tables below show the current and historical composition of the council by political party.

Røst kommunestyre 2023–2027
Party name (in Norwegian)	Number of representatives
Røst Collaboration List (Røst Samarbeidsliste)	9
Centre List (Sentrumslista)	2
Total number of members:	11

Røst kommunestyre 2019–2023
Party name (in Norwegian)	Number of representatives
List for Red, Centre, and independent fishermen (Liste for Rødt, Senterpartiet og partiuavhengige fiskere)	1
Røst Collaboration List (Røst Samarbeidsliste)	6
Centre List (Sentrumslista)	4
Total number of members:	11

Røst kommunestyre 2015–2019
Party name (in Norwegian)	Number of representatives
Common List: Labour Party, Red and independents (Felleslista (Ap, Rødt og uavhengige velgere))	6
Centre List: Coastal Party, Liberals and independents (Sentrumslista: Kystpartiet, Venstre og uavhengige velgere)	5
Total number of members:	11

Røst kommunestyre 2011–2015
Party name (in Norwegian)	Number of representatives
Common List: Labour Party, Red and independents (Felleslista (Ap, Rødt og uavhengige velgere))	6
Centre List: Coastal Party, Liberals and independents (Sentrumslista: Kystpartiet, Venstre og uavhengige velgere)	5
Total number of members:	11

Røst kommunestyre 2007–2011
Party name (in Norwegian)	Number of representatives
Røst Labour Party and free voters list (Røst Arbeiderparti og frie velgeres liste)	5
Centre List: Coastal Party, Liberals and independents (Sentrumslista: Kystpartiet, Venstre og uavhengige velgere)	5
Joint list of the Conservative Party (Høyre), Christian Democratic Party (Kristelig Folkeparti), Centre Party (Senterpartiet), and Progress Party (Fremskrittspartiet)	1
Total number of members:	11

Røst kommunestyre 2003–2007
Party name (in Norwegian)	Number of representatives
Labour Party (Arbeiderpartiet)	5
Centre List: Coastal Party, Liberals and independents) (Sentrumslista: Kystpartiet, Venstre og uavhengige velgere)	4
Joint list of the Conservative Party (Høyre), Christian Democratic Party (Kristelig Folkeparti), Centre Party (Senterpartiet), and Progress Party (Fremskrittspartiet)	2
Total number of members:	11

Røst kommunestyre 1999–2003
Party name (in Norwegian)	Number of representatives
Labour Party (Arbeiderpartiet)	5
Centre List: Liberals and independents (Sentrumslista Venstre og uavhengige)	5
Joint list of the Conservative Party (Høyre), Christian Democratic Party (Kristelig Folkeparti), and Centre Party (Senterpartiet)	3
Total number of members:	13

Røst kommunestyre 1995–1999
Party name (in Norwegian)	Number of representatives
Labour Party (Arbeiderpartiet)	4
Liberal Party (Venstre)	6
Joint list of the Conservative Party (Høyre), Christian Democratic Party (Kristelig Folkeparti), and Centre Party (Senterpartiet)	3
Total number of members:	13

Røst kommunestyre 1991–1995
Party name (in Norwegian)	Number of representatives
Labour Party (Arbeiderpartiet)	5
Liberal Party (Venstre)	6
Joint list of the Conservative Party (Høyre), Christian Democratic Party (Kristelig Folkeparti), and Centre Party (Senterpartiet)	2
Total number of members:	13

Røst kommunestyre 1987–1991
Party name (in Norwegian)	Number of representatives
Labour Party (Arbeiderpartiet)	6
Centre List: Liberals and independents (Sentrumslista Venstre og uavhengige velgere)	5
Joint list of the Conservative Party (Høyre), Christian Democratic Party (Kristelig Folkeparti), and Centre Party (Senterpartiet)	2
Total number of members:	13

Røst kommunestyre 1983–1987
Party name (in Norwegian)	Number of representatives
Labour Party (Arbeiderpartiet)	7
Liberal Party (Venstre)	4
Joint list of the Conservative Party (Høyre), Christian Democratic Party (Kristelig Folkeparti), and Centre Party (Senterpartiet)	2
Total number of members:	13

Røst kommunestyre 1979–1983
Party name (in Norwegian)	Number of representatives
Labour Party (Arbeiderpartiet)	6
Common list (Samlingsliste)	5
Non-party list (Upolitisk liste)	2
Total number of members:	13

Røst kommunestyre 1975–1979
Party name (in Norwegian)	Number of representatives
Labour Party (Arbeiderpartiet)	6
Common list (Samlingsliste)	7
Total number of members:	13

Røst kommunestyre 1971–1975
Party name (in Norwegian)	Number of representatives
Labour Party (Arbeiderpartiet)	7
Local List(s) (Lokale lister)	6
Total number of members:	13

Røst kommunestyre 1967–1971
Party name (in Norwegian)	Number of representatives
Labour Party (Arbeiderpartiet)	5
Joint List(s) of Non-Socialist Parties (Borgerlige Felleslister)	8
Total number of members:	13

Røst kommunestyre 1963–1967
Party name (in Norwegian)	Number of representatives
Labour Party (Arbeiderpartiet)	7
Joint List(s) of Non-Socialist Parties (Borgerlige Felleslister)	6
Total number of members:	13

Røst herredsstyre 1959–1963
Party name (in Norwegian)	Number of representatives
Labour Party (Arbeiderpartiet)	7
Joint List(s) of Non-Socialist Parties (Borgerlige Felleslister)	6
Total number of members:	13

Røst herredsstyre 1955–1959
Party name (in Norwegian)	Number of representatives
Labour Party (Arbeiderpartiet)	6
Joint List(s) of Non-Socialist Parties (Borgerlige Felleslister)	7
Local List(s) (Lokale lister)	9
Total number of members:	13

Røst herredsstyre 1951–1955
Party name (in Norwegian)	Number of representatives
Local List(s) (Lokale lister)	12
Total number of members:	12

Røst herredsstyre 1947–1951
Party name (in Norwegian)	Number of representatives
Labour Party (Arbeiderpartiet)	9
Joint List(s) of Non-Socialist Parties (Borgerlige Felleslister)	3
Total number of members:	12

Røst herredsstyre 1945–1947
Party name (in Norwegian)	Number of representatives
Local List(s) (Lokale lister)	12
Total number of members:	12

Røst herredsstyre 1937–1941*
Party name (in Norwegian)	Number of representatives
Labour Party (Arbeiderpartiet)	4
List of workers, fishermen, and small farmholders (Arbeidere, fiskere, småbrukere liste)	1
Joint List(s) of Non-Socialist Parties (Borgerlige Felleslister)	5
Local List(s) (Lokale lister)	2
Total number of members:	12
Note: Due to the German occupation of Norway during World War II, no elections were held for new municipal councils until after the war ended in 1945.

=== Mayors ===
The mayor (Norwegian: ordfører) of Røst Municipality is the political leader of the municipality and the chairperson of the municipal council. Here is a list of people who have held this position:

- 1929–1941: Mathias Skaar (H)
- 1941–1945: Jentoft N. Henriksen (NS)
- 1945–1945: Gunnar Raanes
- 1948–1951: Henry M. Johansen (Ap)
- 1951–1954: Alf Raanes (Ap)
- 1954–1955: Leif G. Nilsen (Ap)
- 1956–1957: Annar Dyrstad
- 1957–1963: Charles Johnsen (H)
- 1964–1967: Leif G. Nilsen (Ap)
- 1968–1971: Charles Johnsen (H)
- 1972–1972: Jann Skaar (Ap)
- 1972–1975: Magnor Arntsen (Ap)
- 1976–1979: Evald Jakobsen (Sp)
- 1980–1987: Magnor Arntsen (Ap)
- 1987–1999: Arnfinn Ellingsen (V)
- 1999–2007: Paul Rånes (Kyst)
- 2007–2011: Arnfinn Ellingsen (V)
- 2011–2019: Tor-Arne Andreassen (Ap)
- 2019–present: Elisabeth Mikalsen (LL/Sp)

== Transportation ==
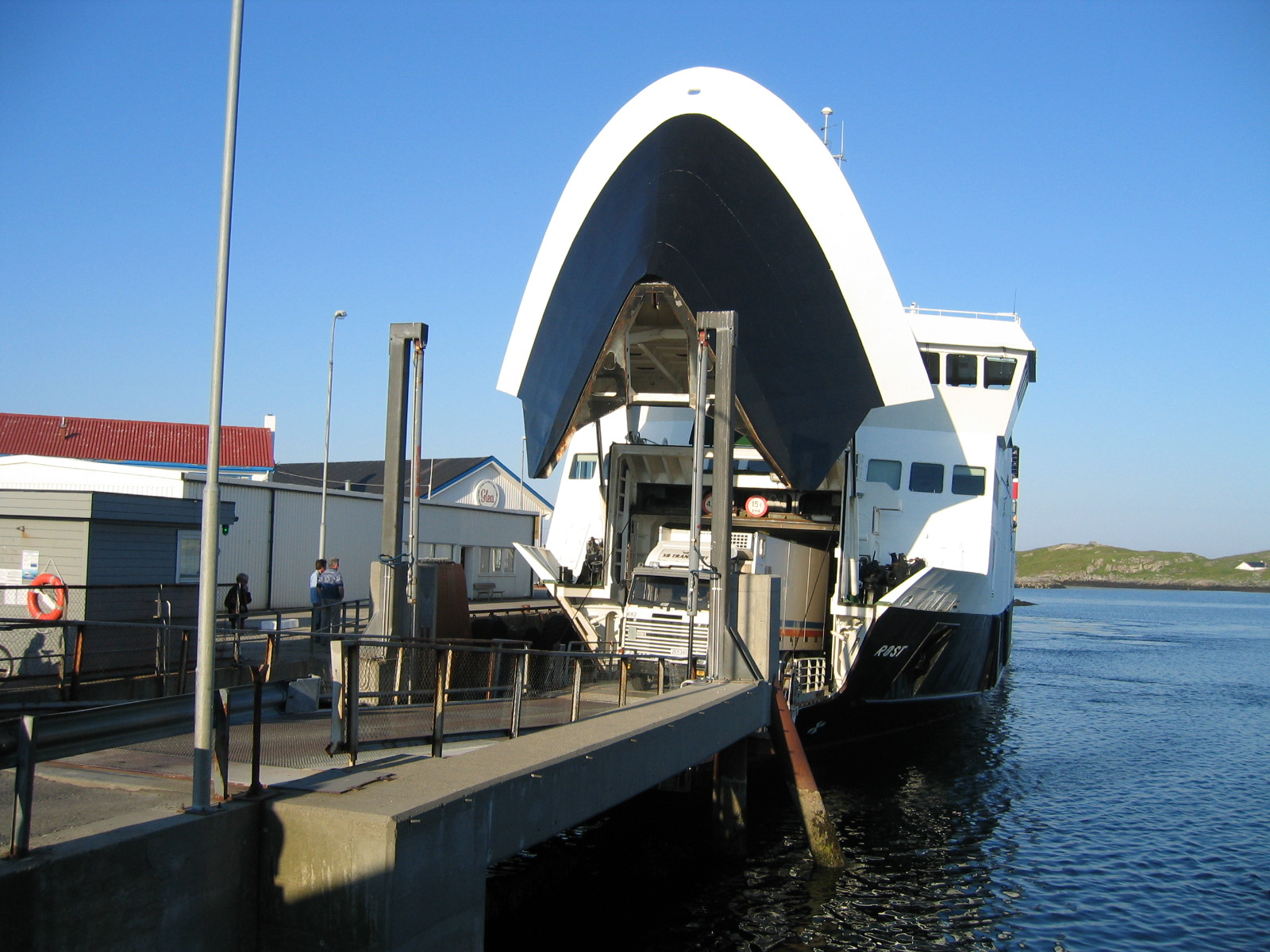
The ferry in Røst harbor

As an isolated island municipality, there are no road connections to Røst. It can be reached by boat and airplane. There are ferry connections to the neighboring island of Værøya and also to the nearby town of Bodø on the mainland. Røst Airport has regularly scheduled flights to Bodø.

== Economy ==
During the winter, the population of Røst gets doubled due to the number of boats arriving at Røst to fish. Yearly, the small island of Røst produces fish and fish-related products worth more than US$40 million.

== Environment ==
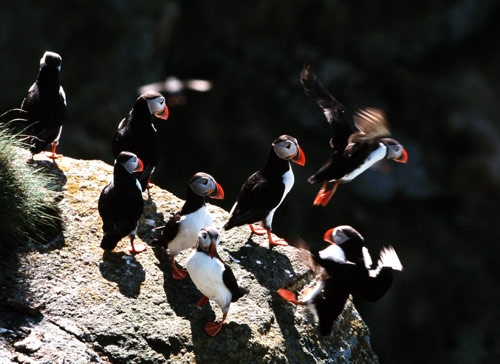
Atlantic puffins; Røst has the largest seabird colonies in Norway.

=== Geography ===
There are 365 islands and skerries in the municipality situated about 100 kilometres (60 mi) off the mainland, at the southwestern tip of the Lofoten island chain in the Vestfjorden. Skomvær Lighthouse is located in the southern part of the municipality on the small island of Skomvær. Most inhabitants live on the main island of Røstlandet, but a few other islands are also inhabited. These islands are linked to Røstlandet with roads, causeways, and bridges. Røstlandet is the largest island in the municipality and its highest point rises no more than 11 m (36 ft) above sea level. South of Røstlandet, there are several small islands that are dominated by large mountains including Vedøya, Storfjellet, Trenyken, Hærnyken, and Ellevsnyken. The highest point in the municipality is the 259-metre (850 ft) tall mountain Storfjellet.

=== Birdlife ===
Røst is one of the few bird watching localities in Norway that is known worldwide. The seabird colonies that are to be found are regarded as internationally important. The islands offer a range of habitats, and as one would expect, a stop-over point for many species that are migrating even further north. During the last few years, birders have been showing an interest for Røst during the autumn, producing a whole range of rarities.

The municipality also has one of the largest bird cliffs in the North Atlantic, with puffin colonies, as well as colonies of shag, kittiwake, and cormorants. A 16,000 ha area encompassing the Røst archipelago and its adjacent marine waters has been designated an Important Bird Area (IBA) by BirdLife International because it supports large breeding colonies of European shags and Atlantic puffins. Other birds breeding in the IBA include European storm petrels, Leach's storm petrels, razorbills, common murres, northern fulmars and black-legged kittiwakes. The IBA contains the Røstlandet and Nykan nature reserves as well as the 7000 ha Røstøyan Ramsar site.

=== Climate ===
Despite being north of the Arctic Circle, Røst features a rare cold-summer mediterranean climate (Köppen Csc), also bordering a subpolar oceanic climate (Köppen Cfc). Røst and Værøy were earlier known by meteorologists as the most northern locations in the world with average temperatures above freezing all winter, but with the updated 1991-2020 normals there are more northern locations in Norway with average temperatures above freezing all winter. The winter temperatures in southern Lofoten represent the largest temperature anomaly in the world relative to latitude. The mean annual temperature is 6.0 °C (42.8 °F) (1991–2020), and the average annual precipitation is 873.9 mm (34.41 in). The wettest months are October through December with approximately 90–120 millimetres (3.5–4.7 in) precipitation each month, and the driest period is during May and June with on average of 40 millimetres (1.6 in) each month. Precipitation varies considerably: in June 2009, only 1 millimetre (0.039 in) of precipitation fell and July 2009 had only 7 millimetres (0.28 in) of rain, while in December 2008, there was 127 millimetres (5.0 in) of precipitation registered. The average date for the last overnight freeze (low below 0 °C (32.0 °F)) in spring is April 22 and average date for first freeze in autumn is November 5 giving a frost-free season of 196 days (1981-2010 average).

Climate data for Røst (1991–2020 averages; extremes 1957-2024)
Month	Jan	Feb	Mar	Apr	May	Jun	Jul	Aug	Sep	Oct	Nov	Dec	Year
Record high °C (°F)	10.0 (50.0)	10.4 (50.7)	10.7 (51.3)	14.7 (58.5)	18.9 (66.0)	22.5 (72.5)	23.1 (73.6)	22.8 (73.0)	18.4 (65.1)	15.2 (59.4)	13.5 (56.3)	11.7 (53.1)	23.1 (73.6)
Mean daily maximum °C (°F)	3.6 (38.5)	3.1 (37.6)	3.6 (38.5)	5.6 (42.1)	8.5 (47.3)	11.1 (52.0)	13.8 (56.8)	13.9 (57.0)	11.9 (53.4)	8.6 (47.5)	6.2 (43.2)	4.8 (40.6)	7.9 (46.2)
Daily mean °C (°F)	2 (36)	1.3 (34.3)	1.8 (35.2)	3.5 (38.3)	6.4 (43.5)	9.1 (48.4)	11.6 (52.9)	11.8 (53.2)	9.9 (49.8)	6.8 (44.2)	4.5 (40.1)	2.7 (36.9)	6.0 (42.8)
Mean daily minimum °C (°F)	−0.3 (31.5)	−0.6 (30.9)	−0.2 (31.6)	1.7 (35.1)	4.5 (40.1)	7.4 (45.3)	9.9 (49.8)	10.2 (50.4)	8.3 (46.9)	5.1 (41.2)	2.6 (36.7)	1.0 (33.8)	4.2 (39.6)
Record low °C (°F)	−12.4 (9.7)	−12.1 (10.2)	−8.4 (16.9)	−6.2 (20.8)	−2.6 (27.3)	−0.1 (31.8)	5.6 (42.1)	3.9 (39.0)	0.0 (32.0)	−4.0 (24.8)	−6.1 (21.0)	−8.4 (16.9)	−12.4 (9.7)
Average precipitation mm (inches)	126.0 (4.96)	84.6 (3.33)	68.0 (2.68)	44.5 (1.75)	42.8 (1.69)	36.8 (1.45)	48.8 (1.92)	61.8 (2.43)	75.9 (2.99)	88.7 (3.49)	98.3 (3.87)	97.7 (3.85)	873.9 (34.41)
Source: Norwegian Centre for Climate Services

== In popular culture ==
"The Half Brother" by Lars Saabye Christensen is a book about Røst.

The game Ships at Sea is based on the archipelago centred around the main port.
