= 168th Division =

168th Division may refer to:

- 168th Infantry Division (Wehrmacht), Germany
- 168th Rifle Division, Soviet Union

== See also ==
- List of military divisions by number
- 168th Brigade (disambiguation)
- 168th Regiment (disambiguation)
- 168th (disambiguation)
