= 168th =

168th is the ordinal form of the number 168. 168th or One hundred and sixty-eighth may also refer to:

- A fraction, 1/168, equal to one of 168 equal parts

== Geography ==
- 168th meridian east, a line of longitude
- 168th meridian west, a line of longitude

== Military ==
- 168th Brigade (disambiguation)
- 168th Infantry Division (Wehrmacht)
- 168th Regiment (disambiguation)

== See also ==
- June 17, 168th day of the year in a standard year
