= Røstlandet (village) =

- Village
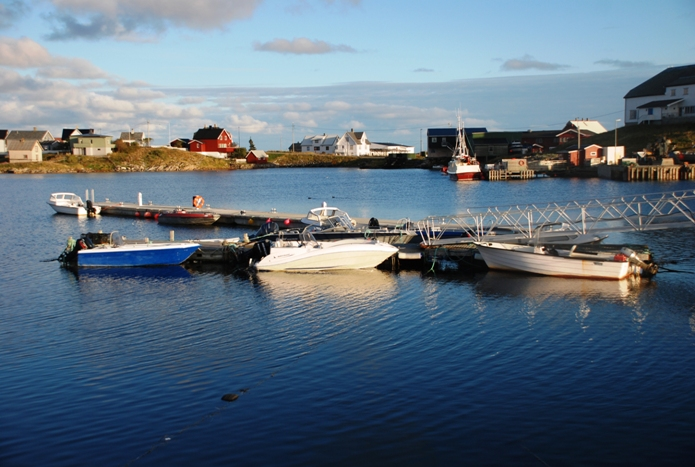
- View of the village harbour
- Interactive map of Røstlandet
- Location within Nordland Location within Norway
- Coordinates: 67.5243°N 12.1152°E
- Country: Norway
- Region: Northern Norway
- County: Nordland
- District: Lofoten
- Municipality: Røst Municipality

Area
  - Total: 0.62 km^{2} (0.24 sq mi)
- Elevation: 3 m (9.8 ft)

Population (2023)
  - Total: 331
  - Density: 534/km^{2} (1,380/sq mi)
- Time zone: UTC+01:00 (CET)
  - Summer (DST): UTC+02:00 (CEST)
- Post Code: 8064 Røst

Røstlandet is the administrative centre of Røst Municipality in Nordland county, Norway. The fishing village covers the southeastern half of the island of Røstlandet. Røst Airport is located on the northern part of the island. Røst Church is located in the village and serves the people of Røst Municipality.

The 0.62-square-kilometre (150-acre) village has a population (2023) of 331 and a population density of 534 inhabitants per square kilometre (1,380/sq mi). Despite its small size, the island attracts many tourists each year.

The village is connected to several smaller islands to the southwest by bridges. There are regular ferry routes connecting the small island of Tjuvøya to the mainland town of Bodø and the nearby island municipalities of Moskenes and Værøy. Skomvær Lighthouse is located about 15 kilometres (9.3 mi) southwest of the village.

Despite its latitude located above 67°N latitude and lying above the Arctic Circle, the village has a climate bordering on Cold-summer mediterranean climate with wet winters and dry, warm summers and is known as a "climatic anomaly" due to abnormally warm temperatures.

== Media gallery ==
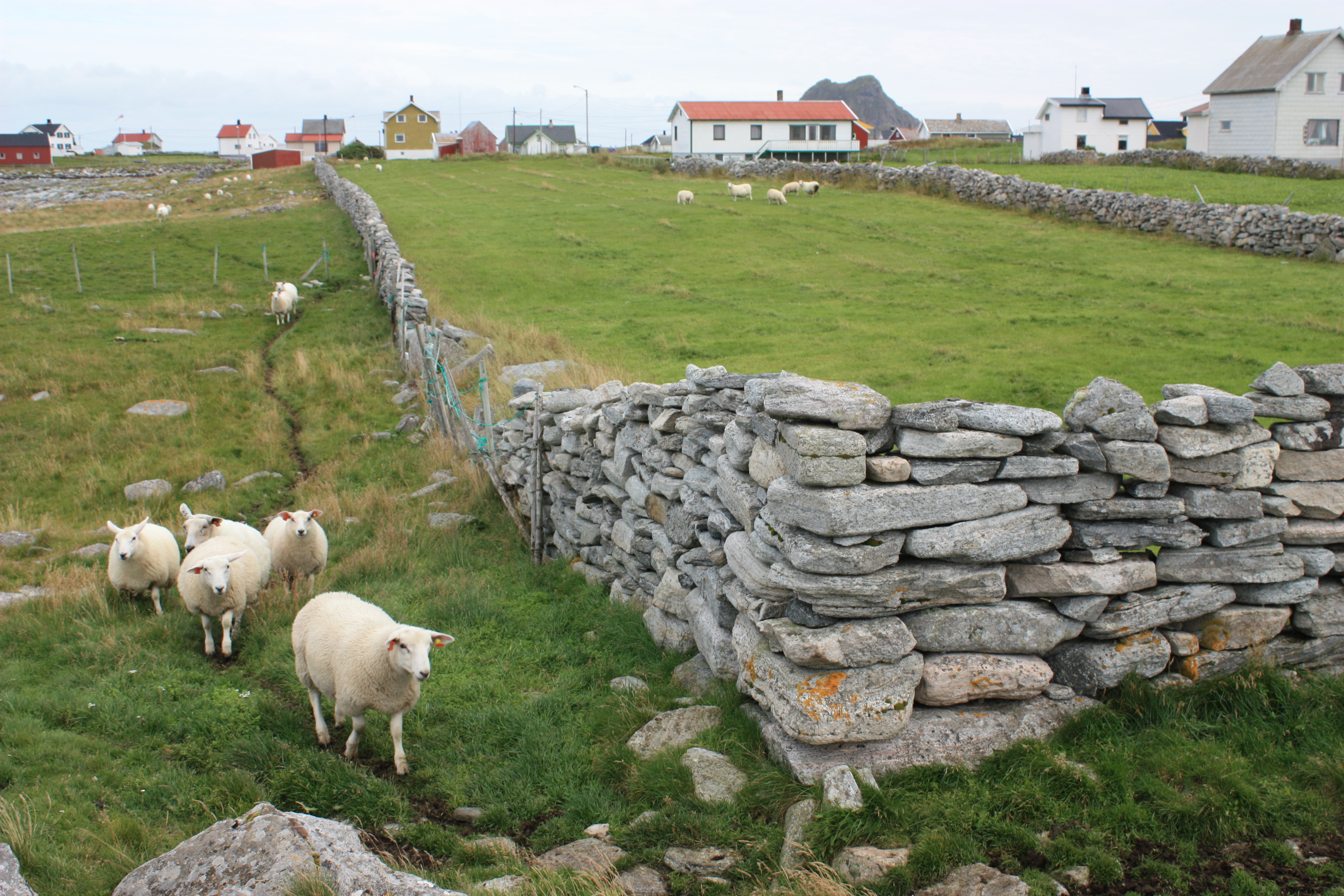

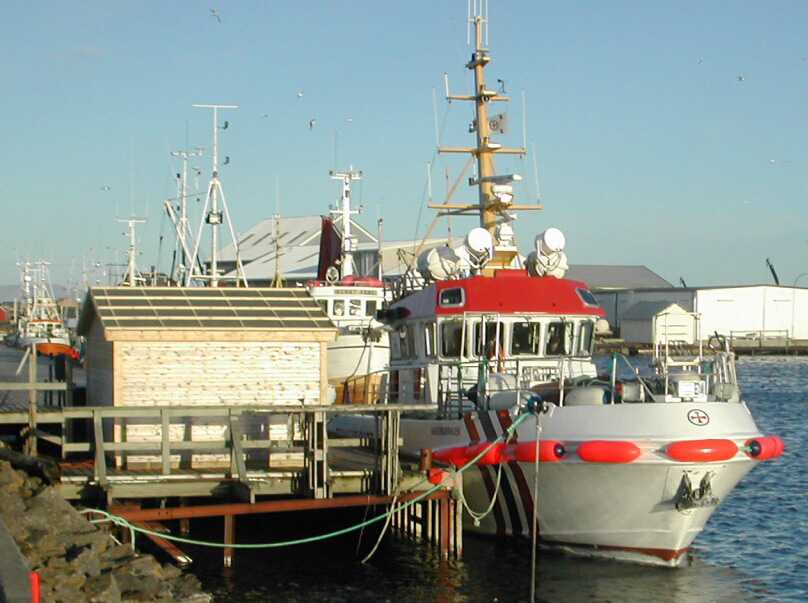

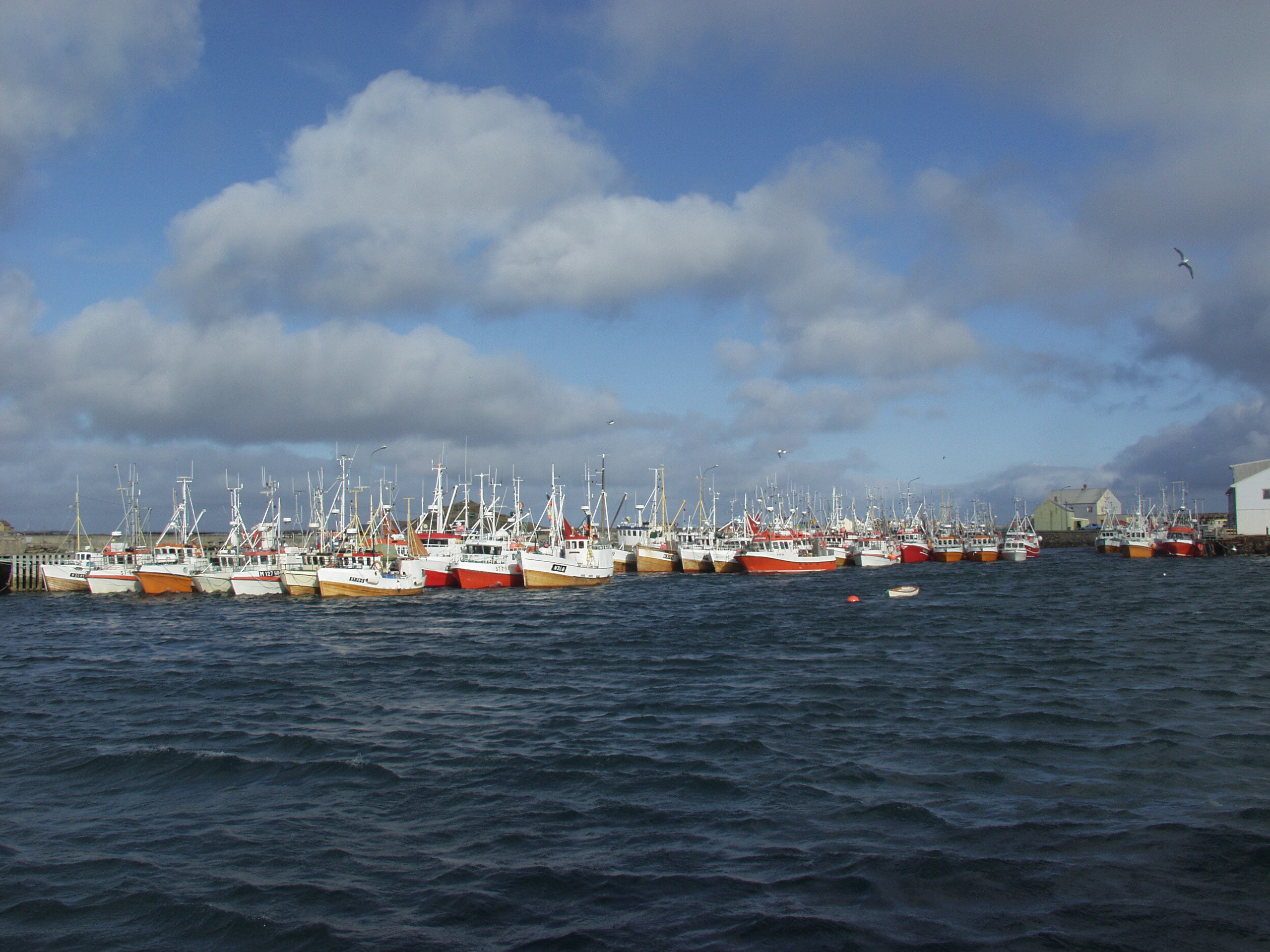

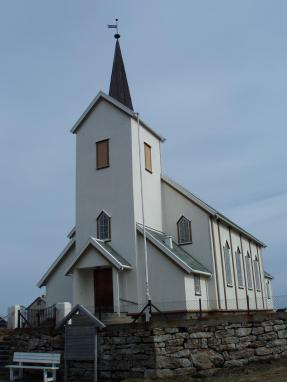

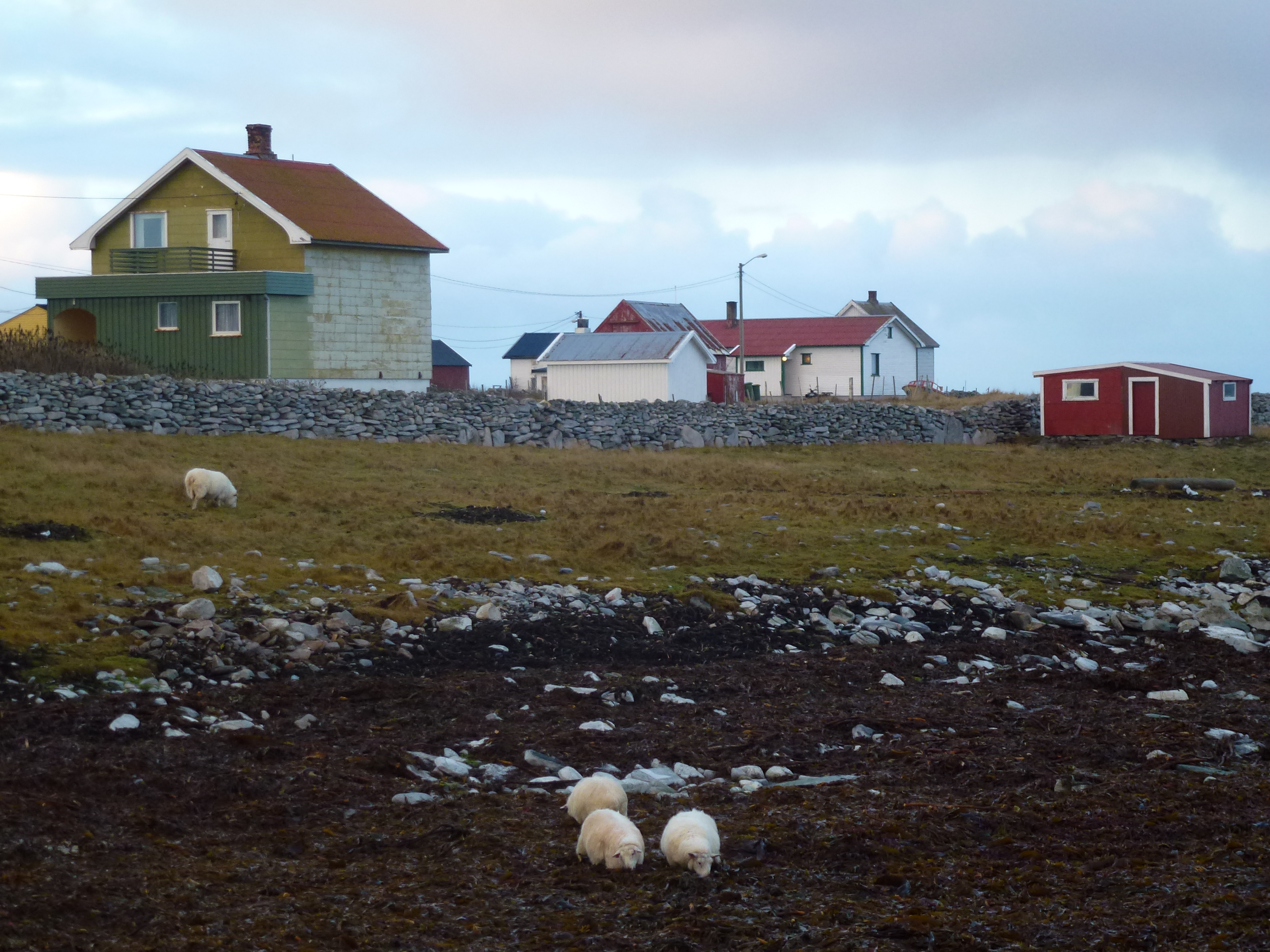
