= Florence meridian =

Meridian passing trough Florence, Italy

11.25th meridian east (interactive map)

Peters World Map Florence Meridian Greenwich Meridian

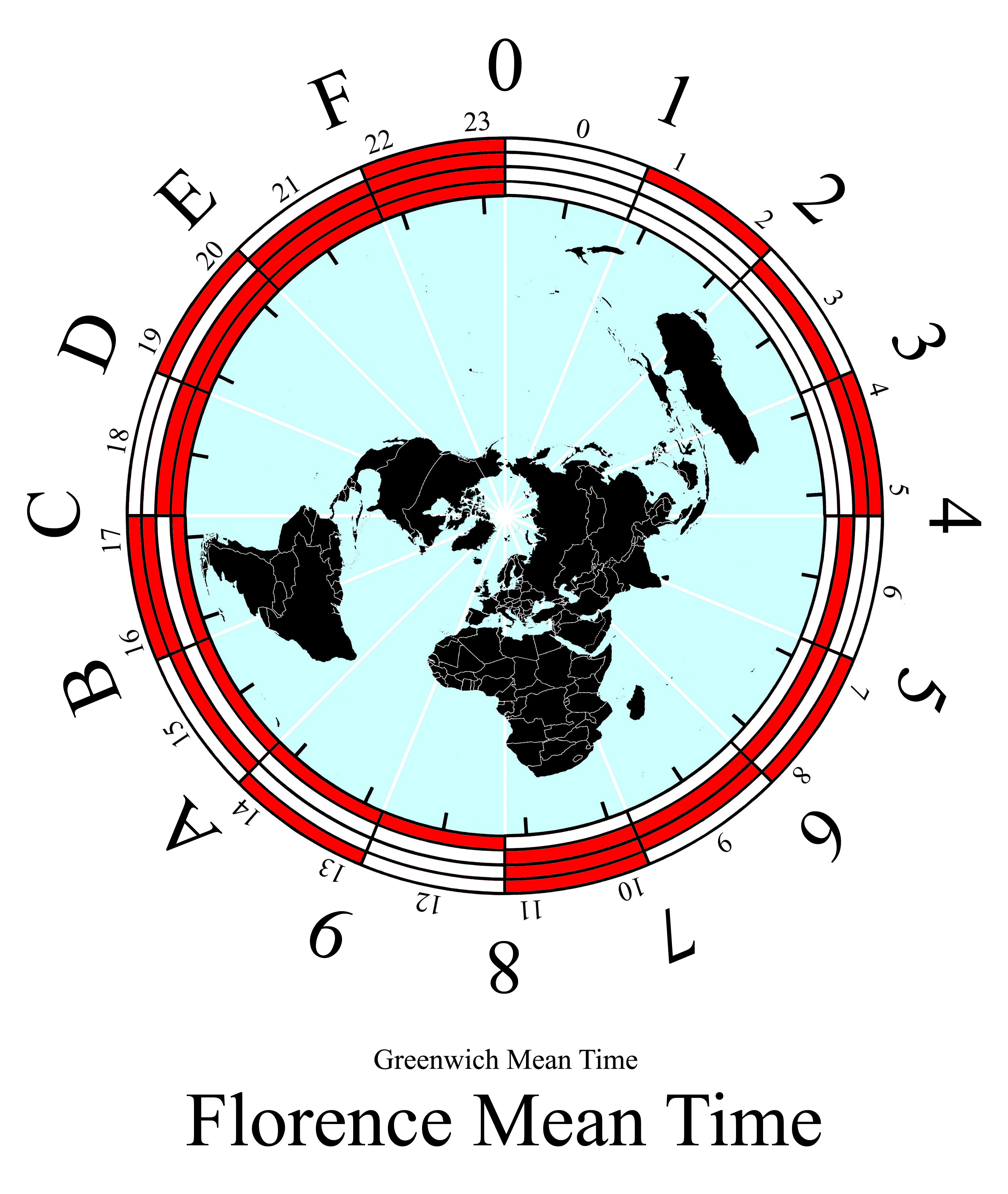
Hexadecimal clockface showing Florence time

The Meridian 11°15' East was proposed as prime meridian by Arno Peters in the Peters World Map. The Meridian is the antipode of 168°45' West of Greenwich which runs through the Bering Strait and was proposed as a new date line. On Peters' world map the easternmost part of Asia and Russia is not displayed left of Alaska, as is usually done on Greenwich-centered maps, but on the right side as the rest of Russia and Asia.

The meridian, 11° 15' East of Greenwich traverses the city center of Florence in Italy and therefore is also known as Florence Meridian.

It passes through:

Country	City, Country subdivision or other locality
Norway	Spitsbergen of Svalbard - 79°20′N 11°15′E; Prince Charles Foreland of Svalbard - 78°30′N 11°15′E; Straumen, Trøndelag – 63°44′N 11°15′E; Levanger on Trondheim Fjord – 63°44′N 11°15′E; Aunegrenda – 62°57′N 11°15′E; East of Lake Mjøsa, south end – 60°30′N 11°15′E; Sundet, northeast of Oslo – 60°19′N 11°15′E; East of Skantebygda – 59°24′N 11°15′E
Sweden	Strömstad – 58°56′N 11°15′E; Kungshamn – 58°22′N 11°15′E
Denmark	East of Læsø Island – 57°16′N 11°15′E; Kaldred, east of Kalundborg – 55°41′N 11°15′E; Forlev-Vemmelev, between Slagelse and Korsør – 55°22′N 11°15′E; Skælskør – 55°15′N 11°15′E; Søllested - 54°48′N 11°15′E
Germany	East corner of Fehmarn Island - 54°27′N 11°15′E; West of Wismar and Hohenkirchen – 53°54′N 11°15′E; East of Wolfsburg – 52°25′N 11°15′E; Buchenwald, west of Weimar – 51°1′N 11°15′E; East of Nuremberg – 49°27′N 11°15′E; West of Ingolstadt – 48°46′N 11°15′E; Fürstenfeldbruck, west of Munich – 48°8′N 11°15′E
Austria	West of Innsbruck – 47°16′N 11°15′E
Italy	Trento – 46°04′N 11°15′E; West of Vicenza – 45°33′N 11°15′E; East of Verona – 45°26′N 11°15′E; West of Bologna – 44°30′N 11°15′E; Florence – 43°47′N 11°15′E; Between Baccinello and Grosseto - 42°47′N 11°15′E
Tunisia	Mediterranean Sea c. 10 km east of Kelibia on Cap Bon Peninsula – 36°51′N 11°15′E; Remla on Chergui island – 34°43′N 11°15′E; East of Ben Gardane – 33°8′N 11°15′E
Libya	Between Kabaw and Al Majabrah in the Tripolitania region – 31°42′N 11°15′E
Algeria	Illizi Province – 23°50′N 11°15′E
Niger	Across Bilma Department of Agadez Region - 18°41′N 11°15′E; East side of Goudoumaria in Diffa Region - 13°43′N 11°15′E
Nigeria	East side of Potiskum in Yobe State - 11°43′N 11°15′E; East side of Gombe, capital of Gombe State – 10°17′N 11°15′E; West side of Jalingo, capital of Taraba State - 8°54′N 11°22′E
Cameroon	East side of Bafia – 4°45′N 11°15′E; West of Yaoundé – 3°52′N 11°15′E; East side of Ebolowa – 2°55′N 11°15′E
Equatorial Guinea	The eastern border of the country is defined as the Meridian 12° East. The Meridian 11°15 East runs through: West side of Ebibeyin, capital of Kié-Ntem Province - 2°09′N 11°15′E; West side of Mongomo, capital of Wele-Nzas Province - 1°38′N 11°15′E
Gabon	The intersection with the equator is in eastern Abanga-Bigne department of Moyen-Ogooué Province at 0°0′N 11°15′E, between Mevang in the province and Ayem in the nearby Lopé department of Ogooué-Ivindo.
Republic of the Congo	West of Tchibenda Lake in Conkouati Reserve, Madingo-Kayes District - 3°54′S 11°15′E
None (offshore in the Atlantic Ocean)	50 km west of the mouth of the Cunene River which marks the Angolan–Namibian border – 17°15′S 11°15′E

== See also ==
- 11th Meridian East
- 12th Meridian East
