= 169th meridian =

169th meridian may refer to:

- 169th meridian east, a line of longitude east of the Greenwich Meridian
- 169th meridian west, a line of longitude west of the Greenwich Meridian

169th meridian west	169th meridian east
