= 11th meridian east =

Line of longitude

11th meridian east

The meridian 11° east of Greenwich is a line of longitude that extends from the North Pole across the Arctic Ocean, Europe, Africa, the Atlantic Ocean, the Southern Ocean, and Antarctica to the South Pole.

The 11th meridian east forms a great circle with the 169th meridian west.

== From Pole to Pole ==
Starting at the North Pole and heading south to the South Pole, the 11th meridian east passes through:

| Co-ordinates | Country, territory or sea | Notes |
|---|---|---|
| 90°0′N 11°0′E | Arctic Ocean | |
| 79°45′N 11°0′E | Norway | Islands of Spitsbergen and Prince Charles Foreland, Svalbard |
| 78°30′N 11°0′E | Atlantic Ocean | |
| 64°57′N 11°0′E | Norway | Entering at Ytter-Vikna in Trøndelag. Exiting at Kirkeøy in Østfold. |
| 58°57′N 11°0′E | Sweden | Koster Islands |
| 58°52′N 11°0′E | Skagerrak | |
| 57°48′N 11°0′E | Kattegat | |
| 57°18′N 11°0′E | Denmark | Island of Læsø |
| 57°12′N 11°0′E | Kattegat | Passing just east of Grenå, Jutland, Denmark |
| 55°45′N 11°0′E | Denmark | Island of Zealand |
| 55°35′N 11°0′E | Great Belt | Crossing the Great Belt Fixed Link |
| 55°8′N 11°0′E | Smålandsfarvandet | |
| 54°49′N 11°0′E | Denmark | Island of Lolland |
| 54°46′N 11°0′E | Bay of Kiel | |
| 54°23′N 11°0′E | Germany | Wagrian Peninsula |
| 54°9′N 11°0′E | Bay of Lübeck | |
| 53°59′N 11°0′E | Germany | Passing just west of Nuremberg (at 49°27′N 11°5′E) |
| 47°24′N 11°0′E | Austria | |
| 46°46′N 11°0′E | Italy | Passing just west of Trento (at 46°4′N 11°7′E) and east edge of Verona (at 45°26′N 10°59′E) Agliana, just west of Florence () |
| 42°41′N 11°0′E | Mediterranean Sea | Passing between Giglio Island and the Monte Argentario peninsula, Italy |
| 37°4′N 11°0′E | Tunisia | Cape Bon peninsula |
| 36°45′N 11°0′E | Mediterranean Sea | Gulf of Hammamet |
| 35°39′N 11°0′E | Tunisia | |
| 35°1′N 11°0′E | Mediterranean Sea | |
| 34°41′N 11°0′E | Tunisia | Kerkennah Islands |
| 34°39′N 11°0′E | Mediterranean Sea | Gulf of Gabès |
| 33°51′N 11°0′E | Tunisia | Island of Djerba and the mainland |
| 32°12′N 11°0′E | Libya | East edge of Nalut in the Tripolitania section East of Awaynat in the Fezzan section |
| 24°28′N 11°0′E | Algeria | |
| 22°58′N 11°0′E | Niger | Keling in the Goure department |
| 13°22′N 11°0′E | Nigeria | Gashua and Potiskum in the Yobe State Through Gombe State, passing just west of the capital Gombe (10°17′N 11°10′E) |
| 6°41′N 11°0′E | Cameroon | Mbam-et-Inoubou Department in the Centre Region Meyo Biboulou in the South Region |
| 2°10′N 11°0′E | Equatorial Guinea | Mfuin in Kié-Ntem at 1°59′N 11°2′E |
| 1°0′N 11°0′E | Gabon | Crosses Equator near Elarn (0°10′N 11°4′E) in Abanga-Bigne department of Moyen-Ogooué |
| 3°46′S 11°0′E | Atlantic Ocean | |
| 60°0′S 11°0′E | Southern Ocean | |
| 69°53′S 11°0′E | Antarctica | Queen Maud Land, claimed by Norway |

== See also ==
- 10th meridian east
- Florence meridian
- 12th meridian east
