= 167th Division =

167th Division may refer to:

- 167th Volksgrenadier Division, Wehrmacht, Germany, also known as the 167th Infantry Division
- 167th Motor Rifle Division, Soviet Union
- 167th Rifle Division, Soviet Union

== See also ==
- List of military divisions by number
- 167th Brigade (disambiguation)
- 167th Regiment (disambiguation)
- 167th (disambiguation)
