= 13th meridian west =

Line of longitude

13th meridian west

The meridian 13° west of Greenwich is longitudinal line that extends from the North Pole across the Arctic Ocean, Greenland, the Atlantic Ocean, Africa, the Southern Ocean, and Antarctica to the South Pole.

The 13th meridian west forms a great circle with the 167th meridian east.

== From Pole to Pole ==
Starting at the North Pole and heading south to the South Pole, the 13th meridian west passes through:

Co-ordinates	Country, territory or sea	Notes
90°0′N 13°0′W	Arctic Ocean	
81°42′N 13°0′W	Greenland	
81°6′N 13°0′W	Atlantic Ocean	
27°50′N 13°0′W	Morocco	
27°40′N 13°0′W	Western Sahara	Claimed by Morocco
23°9′N 13°0′W	Mauritania	
15°29′N 13°0′W	Senegal	
12°28′N 13°0′W	Guinea	
9°6′N 13°0′W	Sierra Leone	
8°14′N 13°0′W	Atlantic Ocean	
7°36′N 13°0′W	Sierra Leone	Turtle Islands
7°35′N 13°0′W	Atlantic Ocean	Passing just west of Inaccessible Island, Tristan da Cunha, Saint Helena, Ascension and Tristan da Cunha (at 37°18′S 12°43′W)
60°0′S 13°0′W	Southern Ocean	
71°46′S 13°0′W	Antarctica	Queen Maud Land, claimed by Norway

== See also ==
- 12th meridian west
- 14th meridian west
