= 12th meridian east =

Line of longitude

12th meridian east

The meridian 12° east of Greenwich is a line of longitude that extends from the North Pole across the Arctic Ocean, Europe, Africa, the Atlantic Ocean, the Southern Ocean, and Antarctica to the South Pole.

The 12th meridian east forms a great circle with the 168th meridian west.

== From Pole to Pole ==
Starting at the North Pole and heading south to the South Pole, the 12th meridian east passes through:

| Co-ordinates | Country, territory or sea | Notes |
|---|---|---|
| 90°0′N 12°0′E | Arctic Ocean | |
| 79°44′N 12°0′E | Norway | Islands of Spitsbergen and Prince Charles Foreland, Svalbard |
| 78°13′N 12°0′E | Atlantic Ocean | |
| 67°29′N 12°0′E | Norway | Røst islands |
| 67°28′N 12°0′E | Atlantic Ocean | Norwegian Sea |
| 65°43′N 12°0′E | Norway | Island of Vega |
| 65°38′N 12°0′E | Atlantic Ocean | Norwegian Sea |
| 65°14′N 12°0′E | Norway | |
| 63°17′N 12°0′E | Sweden | For about 4km |
| 63°15′N 12°0′E | Norway | |
| 59°54′N 12°0′E | Sweden | Passing through Gothenburg |
| 57°21′N 12°0′E | Kattegat | |
| 56°1′N 12°0′E | Denmark | Islands of Zealand and Falster |
| 54°43′N 12°0′E | Baltic Sea | Bay of Mecklenburg |
| 54°10′N 12°0′E | Germany | |
| 47°37′N 12°0′E | Austria | |
| 47°3′N 12°0′E | Italy | |
| 41°59′N 12°0′E | Mediterranean Sea | Passing just west of the island of Marettimo, Italy |
| 36°49′N 12°0′E | Italy | Island of Pantelleria |
| 36°44′N 12°0′E | Mediterranean Sea | |
| 33°0′N 12°0′E | Libya | |
| 23°31′N 12°0′E | Niger | |
| 13°10′N 12°0′E | Nigeria | |
| 7°30′N 12°0′E | Cameroon | |
| 2°17′N 12°0′E | Gabon | |
| 2°20′S 12°0′E | Republic of the Congo | |
| 2°57′S 12°0′E | Gabon | |
| 3°9′S 12°0′E | Republic of the Congo | For about 9km |
| 3°14′S 12°0′E | Gabon | |
| 3°25′S 12°0′E | Republic of the Congo | |
| 5°1′S 12°0′E | Atlantic Ocean | |
| 15°36′S 12°0′E | Angola | |
| 17°10′S 12°0′E | Namibia | |
| 18°22′S 12°0′E | Atlantic Ocean | |
| 60°0′S 12°0′E | Southern Ocean | |
| 69°56′S 12°0′E | Antarctica | Queen Maud Land, claimed by Norway |

== See also ==
- 11th meridian east
- 13th meridian east
