= Røst Church =

- Røst kirke
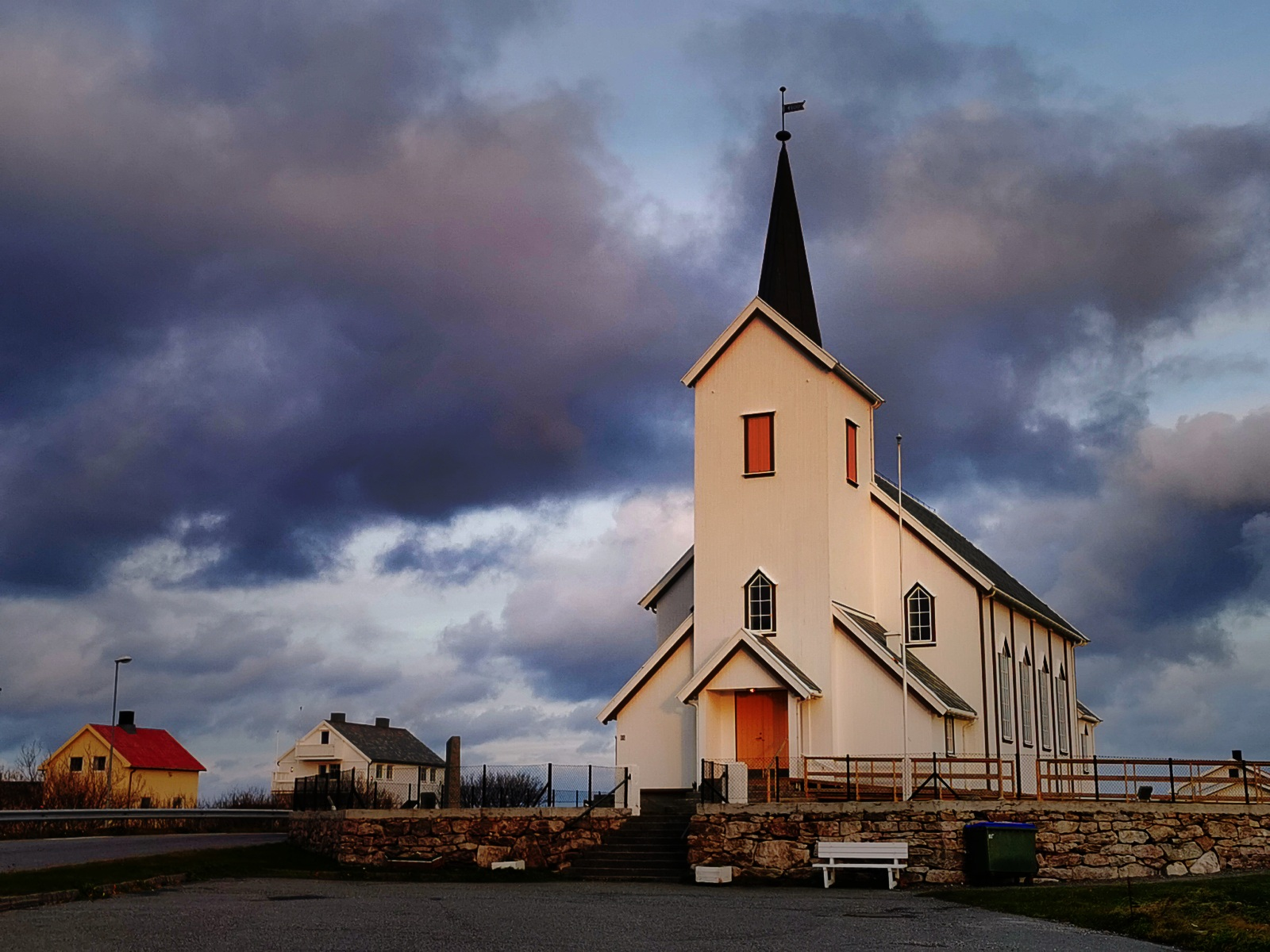
- View of the church and surrounds
- Røst Church
- 67.5176119°N 12.1187675°E
- Location: Røst, Nordland
- Country: Norway
- Denomination: Church of Norway
- Churchmanship: Evangelical Lutheran

History
- Status: Parish church
- Founded: 13th century
- Consecrated: 26 Sept 1900

Architecture
- Functional status: Active
- Architect: A. Evjen
- Architectural type: Long church
- Completed: 1900 (126 years ago)

Specifications
- Capacity: 270
- Materials: Wood

Administration
- Diocese: Sør-Hålogaland
- Deanery: Bodø domprosti
- Parish: Røst
- Norwegian Cultural Heritage Site
- Type: Church
- Status: Listed
- ID: 85343

Røst Church (Norwegian: Røst kirke) is a parish church of the Church of Norway in Røst Municipality in Nordland county, Norway. It is located in the village of Røstlandet on the island of Røstlandet. It is the church for the Røst parish which is part of the Bodø domprosti (deanery) in the Diocese of Sør-Hålogaland. The white, wooden church was built in a long church style in 1900 using plans drawn up by the architect A. Evjen. The church seats about 270 people. The building was consecrated on 26 September 1900.

== History ==
Historical records first show a church in Røst in 1432, although the records show the church was not new at that time. The church in Røst changed locations over the centuries. The first known church was located near the present-day airport on the island, in a rather swampy area, about 1 kilometre (0.62 mi) northwest of the present church site. (The site of the medieval church today is mostly underwater in a swampy area. The is likely because the old rock wall surrounding the churchyard has sunk into the soft ground and is likely holding in the water and preventing normal drainage. This has led to the legend of the old church sinking into the ground.) This church burned down in 1715.

After the fire in 1715, the a new timber-framed cruciform church was rebuilt on a new site (on higher ground) about 470 metres (1,540 ft) to the northeast, next to the present cemetery. The church was torn down in 1785 and rebuilt on the same site. Around the year 1824, the church was struck by lightning and it was badly burned in the resulting fire. Then in January 1835, the church was destroyed in a large winter storm. The following spring and summer, the old church was torn down and a new church was rebuilt about 680 metres (2,230 ft) to the northeast. The new church was a small stone church measuring about 11 by 8 metres (36 ft × 26 ft). It was consecrated on 5 May 1839. In 1883, a new choir and sacristy were built on to the building. That church was soon too small for the parish, so in 1900 a new wooden church was built about 1.3 kilometres (0.81 mi) south of the old church in the main village of Røstlandet.

== Media gallery ==
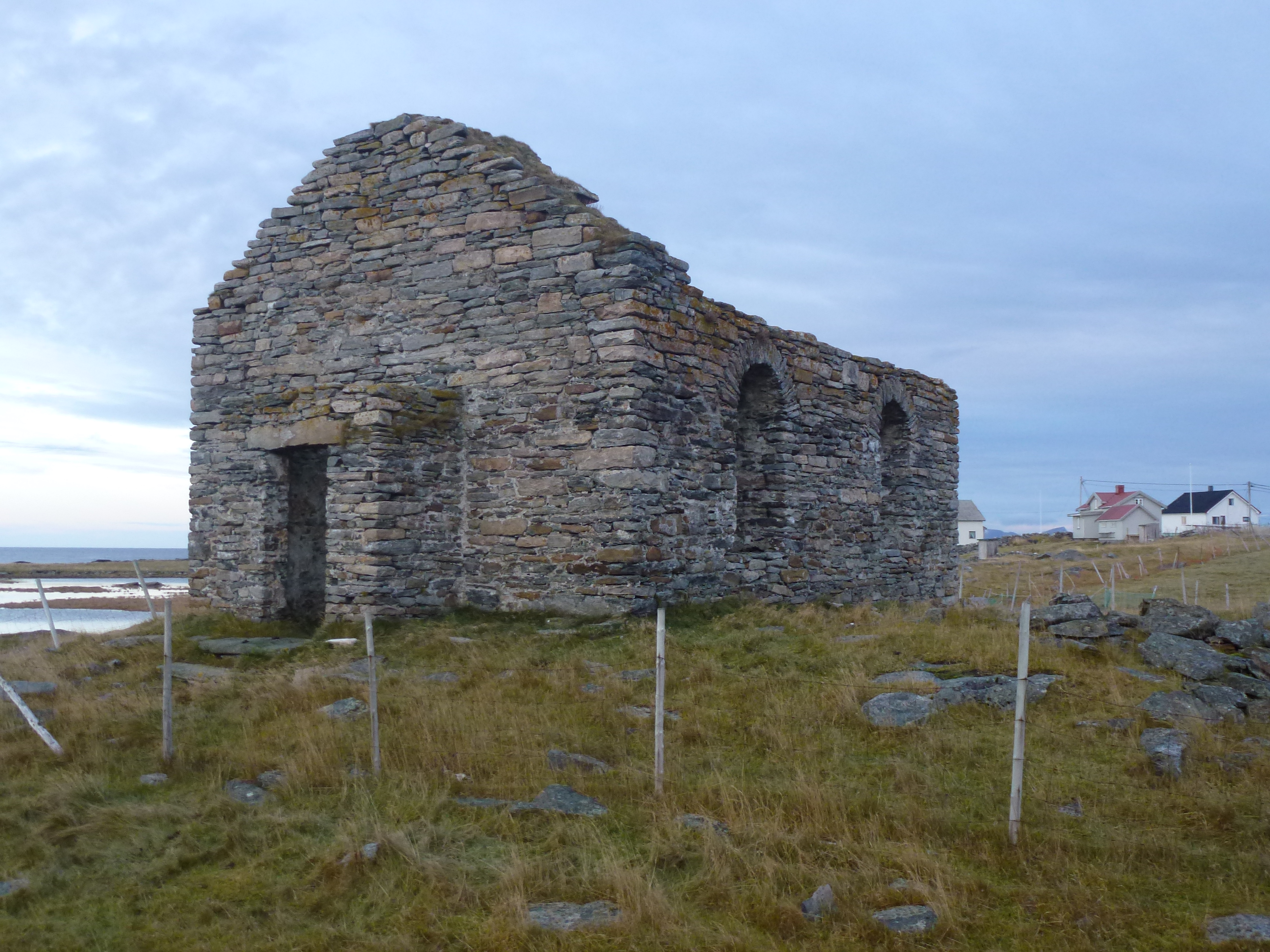
View of the old church (prior to 1900)

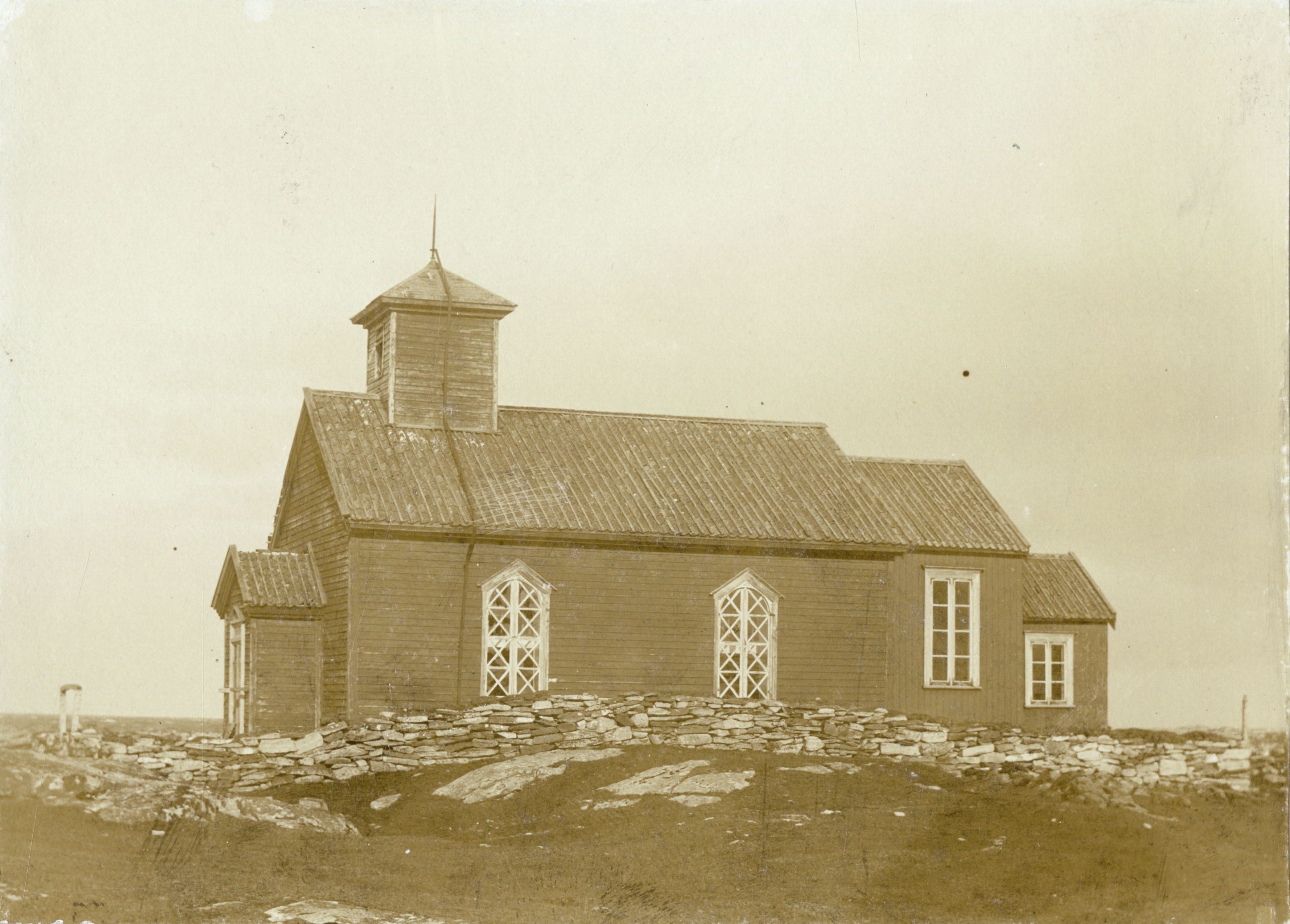
Church around 1900

== See also ==
- List of churches in Sør-Hålogaland
