= Pietro Querini =

Venetian sailing captain in the 15th century

Pietro Querini was a 15th-century sea captain from the Republic of Venice. He is known for being shipwrecked at Røst in northern Norway during the winter of 1432, and subsequently returning to Venice, where he wrote a report of his travels for the Venetian Senate. He is also credited with popularizing stockfish in the Veneto region, where it is prepared as baccalà alla vicentina.

== Shipwreck ==
Bound for Flanders from Chania on Crete in 1431, the merchant ship Querina encountered a fierce storm at the western approach to the English Channel. The storm pushed the ship north, off course, and in succession destroyed its steering equipment and its sail. The ship drifted on the Gulf Stream far across the North Sea. After having lost its ability to manoeuvre, Querini gave the order to abandon ship. One part of the crew, including Querini, went into the ship's smaller launch, while another left the ship in a somewhat larger secondary vessel. The two lost contact almost immediately and only the smaller launch reached shore. Facing a winter storm and cold for weeks, and lacking food and water, several more men died of starvation and fatigue. Just after New Year, in January 1432, the survivors stranded on an island amid the skerries near Røst in Lofoten. The small island was uninhabited, though the survivors discovered a small hut, built to be used in summertime when villagers would bring their cattle to the island for grazing, where they found shelter. They stayed there for over a month, surviving off scallops and a stranded whale. Eventually, they were discovered by chance by a fisherman and his sons, who had made a trip to the island searching for some lost cattle. Only eleven men, of a crew that totalled 68, survived. Eventually they spent more than three months together with the Røst inhabitants.

Two separate accounts of these events have survived. One was written by Querini himself, another by two officers who served on board the ship and also survived, Cristoforo Fioravante and Nicolò de Michiel. Manuscript copies survive in the Vatican Library in Rome and the Biblioteca Marciana in Venice. The accounts may originally have been written as a kind of report to the Venetian authorities, though this is uncertain. A reference to Querini's shipwreck and his stay at Lofoten was included in the Fra Mauro map, made in the 1450s, however. The story was also translated into Tuscan dialect and published by Giovanni Battista Ramusio in a printed version in a collection of travels between 1550 and 1559. Ramusio however altered the text substantially, left out some of the more horrifying parts and added moralising paragraphs.

== Querini opera ==
The lyric opera based on the dramatic story about Pietro Querini was performed for the first time in Røst in 2012, and then again in 2014 and 2018. In October 2023 the Querini Opera will play in Arsenal Nord in Venice. The production has been well received by critics, including by the Financial Times. The music is composed by Norwegian musician and composer Henning Sommerro. The author of the libretto is Ragnar Olsen.

== Other sources ==
- Franco Giliberto and Giuliano Piovan. Alla larga da Venezia. L'incredibile viaggio di Pietro Querini oltre il circolo polare artico nel '400, Marsilio, ISBN 978-88-317-9459-6
- Pietro Querini, Nicolò De Michiele, Cristofalo Fioravante (edited by Paolo Nelli). Il naufragio della Querina. Veneziani nel circolo polare artico, 2007, ISBN 88-88389-79-2
- Surdich, Francesco (2016). "QUERINI, Pietro". Dizionario Biografico degli Italiani (in Italian). Vol. 86: Querenghi–Rensi. Rome: Istituto dell'Enciclopedia Italiana. ISBN 978-88-12-00032-6.
