= Turtle Islands, Sierra Leone =

Islands owned by Sierra Leone in the Atlantic Ocean

Coordinates: 7°37′N 13°02′W

The Turtle Islands are in the Atlantic Ocean, located west of Sherbro Island in Bonthe District, in the Southern Province of Sierra Leone. Of the eight islands, seven are inhabited. Sherbro people are the predominant ethnic group. This eight-island archipelagos expands in a zone of 8 miles (13 km) over shallow waters and white sand banks. Yele, Bakie, Bumpetuk, Chepo, Hoong, Mut, Nyangei and Sei are the names of the islands.

== Economic activities ==
Fishing is the main economic activity. Coconut products and tourism may contribute to the income in a lesser extent.

Erosion is an issue especially on Nyangai and efforts to stem it by planting mangroves has been stymied by goats eating them and people using the wood for fires.

== Traditions ==
Turtle Islands is a remote destination. The fishing communities have preserved their faith and traditions in a vivid manner. Sherbros are very social and spend their evenings in groups, drinking and singing traditional songs focused on bravery and romance. One of the eight islands, Hoong, is off limits to visitors and women. Hoong island is reserved for initiated men as part of a rites of passage.

== Activities ==
There is little tourist infrastructure on any of the islands. Visiting this remote area involves considerable planning. Transportation to Turtle islands is erratic and may not always follow safety standards. Most visitors take a 3-hour boat ride from Freetown. Visit Sierra Leone and Daltons Banana Guesthouse operate tours to Turtle Islands.

== Climate Change ==
The largest island, Nyangai, has found its surface area, and therefore population, reduced by rising sea levels. Environmental expert Joseph Rahall estimates the islands will be completely submerged by 2040.

== See also ==
- Banana Islands
