= 14th meridian west =

Line of longitude

14th meridian west

The meridian 14° west of Greenwich is a line of longitude that extends from the North Pole across the Arctic Ocean, Greenland, Iceland, the Atlantic Ocean, Africa, the Southern Ocean, and Antarctica to the South Pole.

The 14th meridian west forms a great ellipse with the 166th meridian east.

== From Pole to Pole ==
Starting at the North Pole and heading south to the South Pole, the 14th meridian west passes through:

Co-ordinates	Country, territory or sea	Notes
90°0′N 14°0′W	Arctic Ocean	
81°48′N 14°0′W	Greenland	
81°1′N 14°0′W	Atlantic Ocean	Greenland Sea
65°36′N 14°0′W	Iceland	
64°43′N 14°0′W	Atlantic Ocean	
28°43′N 14°0′W	Spain	Island of Fuerteventura
28°12′N 14°0′W	Atlantic Ocean	
26°28′N 14°0′W	Western Sahara	Claimed by Morocco
21°20′N 14°0′W	Mauritania	
16°21′N 14°0′W	Senegal	
13°33′N 14°0′W	Gambia	
13°17′N 14°0′W	Senegal	
12°40′N 14°0′W	Guinea-Bissau	
11°39′N 14°0′W	Guinea	
9°59′N 14°0′W	Atlantic Ocean	Passing just east of Ascension Island, Saint Helena, Ascension and Tristan da Cunha (at 7°57′S 14°18′W)
60°0′S 14°0′W	Southern Ocean	
71°57′S 14°0′W	Antarctica	Queen Maud Land, claimed by Norway

== See also ==
- 13th meridian west
- 15th meridian west
