= Al Awaynat =

Al Awaynat العوينات Alawinat, Sardalas
- Town
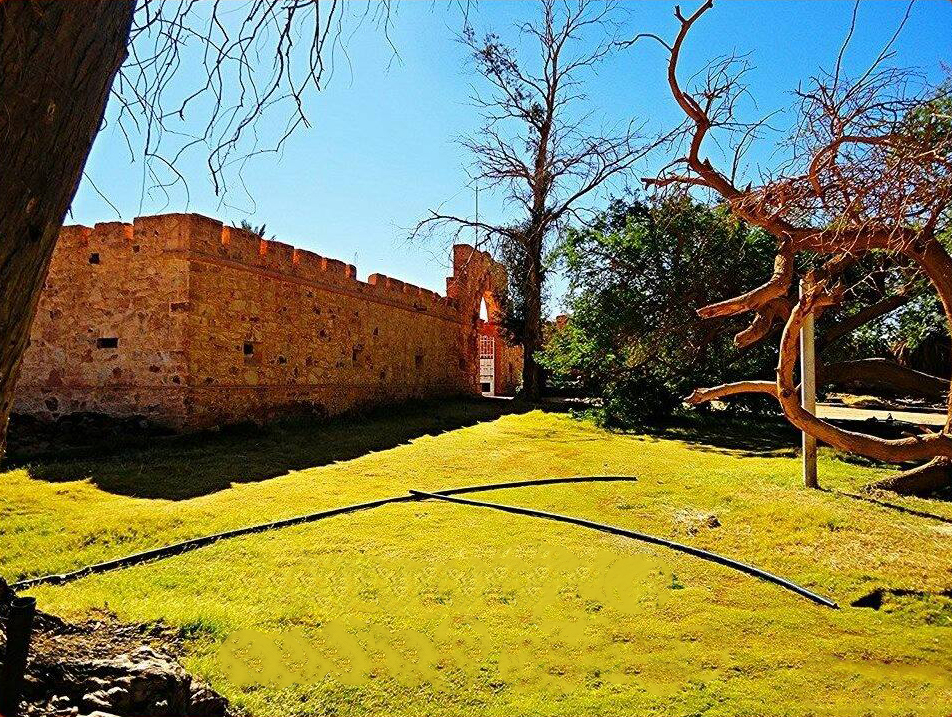

- Location in Libya
- Coordinates: 25°47′N 10°33′E
- Country: Libya
- Region: Fezzan
- District: Ghat

Population
  - Total: 3,168
- Time zone: UTC +2

Al Awaynat or Alawinat (Arabic: العوينات) or Serdeles is a small town located in the Sahara Desert in Libya. It lies at the entrance of the Djebel Al Akakus. It is located 240 km south west of the city of Ubari and 120 km north of the city of Ghat. Al Awaynat is the gate of Tadrart Acacus and its residents from Toureg tribe.

It is located some 240 km (149 mi) west of Ubari. The name Serdeles in the Tuareg language is meaning small springs, the same meaning of the Arabic name, hence, the Arabic name is probably an Arabizing of the Tuareg name.

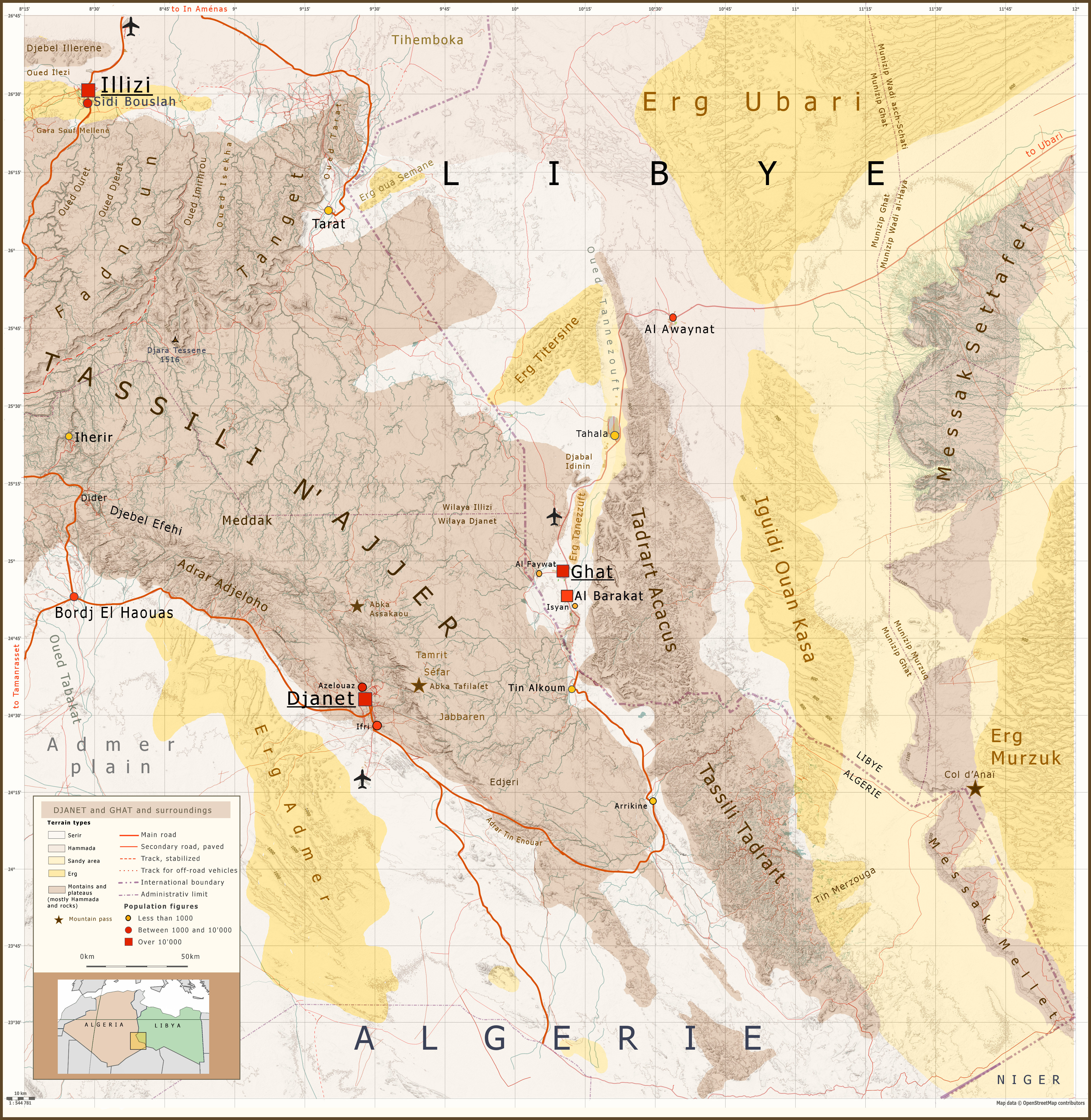
Libyan-Algerian border area with Al Awaynat on the top right
