= 14th meridian east =

Line of longitude

14th meridian east

The meridian 14° east of Greenwich is a line of longitude that extends from the North Pole across the Arctic Ocean, Europe, Africa, the Atlantic Ocean, the Southern Ocean, and Antarctica to the South Pole.

The 14th meridian east forms a great ellipse with the 166th meridian west.

== From Pole to Pole ==
Starting at the North Pole and heading south to the South Pole, the 14th meridian east passes through:

Co-ordinates	Country, territory or sea	Notes
90°0′N 14°0′E	Arctic Ocean	
79°35′N 14°0′E	Norway	Island of Spitsbergen, Svalbard
77°25′N 14°0′E	Atlantic Ocean	Norwegian Sea
68°20′N 14°0′E	Norway	Island of Vestvågøya
68°12′N 14°0′E	Atlantic Ocean	Norwegian Sea
67°17′N 14°0′E	Norway	Bliksvær, Nordland
64°53′N 14°0′E	Sweden	Frostviken
64°21′N 14°0′E	Norway	Lierne National Park, Trøndelag
64°3′N 14°0′E	Sweden	Jämtland, Dalarna, Värmland, Lake Vänern, Västra Götaland, Jönköping, Kronoberg, Skåne
55°25′N 14°0′E	Baltic Sea	
54°4′N 14°0′E	Germany	Island of Usedom
53°51′N 14°0′E	Szczecin Lagoon	
53°46′N 14°0′E	Germany	Mecklenburg-Vorpommern, Brandenburg, Saxony
50°49′N 14°0′E	Czech Republic	Ústí nad Labem, Central Bohemian, South Bohemian
48°43′N 14°0′E	Austria	Upper Austria, Styria, Carinthia
46°29′N 14°0′E	Slovenia	Upper Carniola, Gorizia, Coastal–Karst
45°31′N 14°0′E	Croatia	Istria
44°48′N 14°0′E	Adriatic Sea	
42°41′N 14°0′E	Italy	Abruzzo, Isernia, Frosinone, Caserta and the island of Procida
40°45′N 14°0′E	Mediterranean Sea	Tyrrhenian Sea
38°2′N 14°0′E	Italy	Island of Sicily
37°6′N 14°0′E	Mediterranean Sea	Passing just west of the island of Gozo, Malta
32°44′N 14°0′E	Libya	
22°48′N 14°0′E	Niger	
15°12′N 14°0′E	Chad	The border with Nigeria is in Lake Chad
13°11′N 14°0′E	Nigeria	
11°19′N 14°0′E	Cameroon	
2°10′N 14°0′E	Republic of the Congo	
1°25′N 14°0′E	Gabon	
0°23′N 14°0′E	Republic of the Congo	
0°13′S 14°0′E	Gabon	
2°27′S 14°0′E	Republic of the Congo	
4°28′S 14°0′E	Democratic Republic of the Congo	
5°51′S 14°0′E	Angola	
17°25′S 14°0′E	Namibia	
21°49′S 14°0′E	Atlantic Ocean	
60°0′S 14°0′E	Southern Ocean	
69°22′S 14°0′E	Antarctica	Queen Maud Land, claimed by Norway

== See also ==
- 13th meridian east
- 15th meridian east
