= 13th meridian east =

Line of longitude

13th meridian east

The meridian 13° east of Greenwich is a line of longitude that extends from the North Pole across the Arctic Ocean, Europe, Africa, the Atlantic Ocean, the Southern Ocean, and Antarctica to the South Pole.

The 13th meridian east forms a great circle with the 167th meridian west.

== From Pole to Pole ==
Starting at the North Pole and heading south to the South Pole, the 13th meridian east passes through:

| Co-ordinates | Country, territory or sea | Notes |
|---|---|---|
| 90°0′N 13°0′E | Arctic Ocean | |
| 79°48′N 13°0′E | Norway | Island of Spitsbergen, Svalbard |
| 78°12′N 13°0′E | Atlantic Ocean | Norwegian Sea |
| 68°3′N 13°0′E | Norway | Island of Moskenesøya |
| 67°53′N 13°0′E | Atlantic Ocean | Norwegian Sea |
| 66°41′N 13°0′E | Norway | Several islands and the mainland |
| 64°4′N 13°0′E | Sweden | Passing through Vänern lake |
| 55°44′N 13°0′E | Øresund | |
| 55°37′N 13°0′E | Sweden | Passing through Malmö |
| 55°23′N 13°0′E | Baltic Sea | |
| 54°27′N 13°0′E | Germany | Passing west of Berlin |
| 50°26′N 13°0′E | Czech Republic | |
| 49°19′N 13°0′E | Germany | |
| 48°14′N 13°0′E | Austria | |
| 47°51′N 13°0′E | Germany | For about 3 km |
| 47°50′N 13°0′E | Austria | For about 13 km – passing just west of Salzburg |
| 47°43′N 13°0′E | Germany | |
| 47°28′N 13°0′E | Austria | |
| 46°36′N 13°0′E | Italy | |
| 45°38′N 13°0′E | Adriatic Sea | |
| 43°52′N 13°0′E | Italy | |
| 41°18′N 13°0′E | Mediterranean Sea | Passing between the Pontine Islands, Italy; Passing just west of the island of Ustica, Italy |
| 38°3′N 13°0′E | Italy | Island of Sicily |
| 37°31′N 13°0′E | Mediterranean Sea | Passing just east of the island of Linosa, Italy |
| 32°50′N 13°0′E | Libya | Passing just west of Tripoli |
| 23°18′N 13°0′E | Niger | |
| 13°31′N 13°0′E | Nigeria | Passing just west of Maiduguri |
| 9°28′N 13°0′E | Cameroon | |
| 2°15′N 13°0′E | Gabon | |
| 2°12′S 13°0′E | Republic of the Congo | |
| 4°34′S 13°0′E | Angola | For about 15 km – Cabinda exclave |
| 4°42′S 13°0′E | Democratic Republic of the Congo | |
| 5°53′S 13°0′E | Angola | |
| 7°34′S 13°0′E | Atlantic Ocean | |
| 9°1′S 13°0′E | Angola | For about 7 km – Palmeirinhas Point |
| 9°5′S 13°0′E | Atlantic Ocean | |
| 12°47′S 13°0′E | Angola | |
| 16°59′S 13°0′E | Namibia | |
| 19°56′S 13°0′E | Atlantic Ocean | |
| 60°0′S 13°0′E | Southern Ocean | |
| 69°46′S 13°0′E | Antarctica | Queen Maud Land, claimed by Norway |

== See also ==
- 12th meridian east
- 14th meridian east
