= Skomvær Lighthouse =

Coastal lighthouse in Røst, Norway

Skomvær Lighthouse Skomvær fyrstasjon
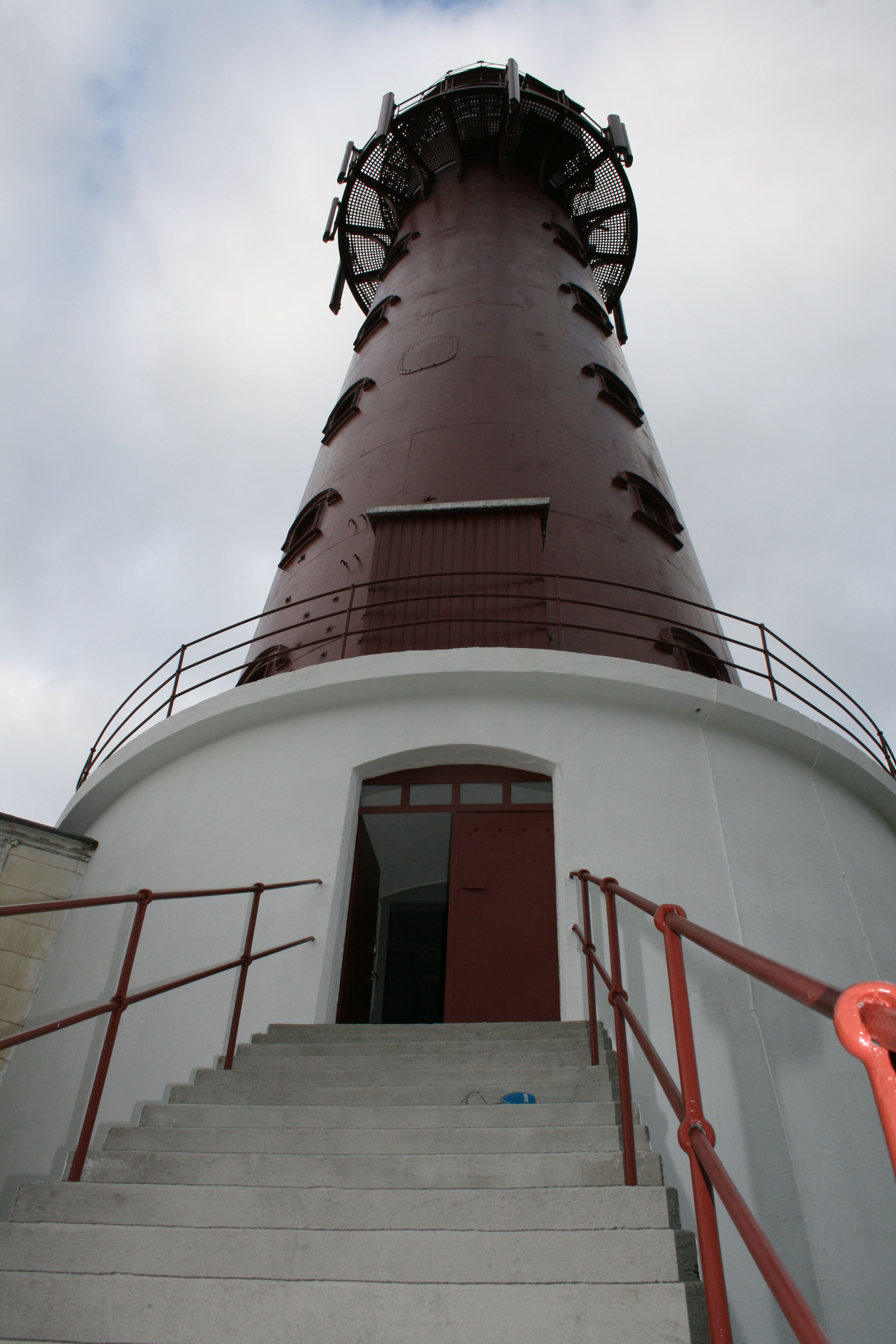
- View of the lighthouse
- Location of the lighthouse
- Location: Nordland, Norway
- Coordinates: 67.4109°N 11.8749°E

Tower
- Constructed: 1887
- Foundation: Stone
- Construction: Cast iron
- Automated: 1978
- Height: 31.7 metres (104 ft)
- Shape: Tapered cylinder
- Markings: White base, red tower
- Heritage: cultural heritage preservation in Norway
- Racon: T (–)

Light
- Deactivated: 1988
- Focal height: 47 metres (154 ft)
- Intensity: 2,007,300 candela
- Range: 18.7 nmi (34.6 km; 21.5 mi)
- Characteristic: Fl(2) W 30s
- Norway no.: 771800

Skomvær Lighthouse (Norwegian: Skomvær fyr) is a coastal lighthouse in Røst Municipality in Nordland county, Norway. The tower is located on the island of Skomvær, about 15 kilometres (9.3 mi) southwest of the main island of Røstlandet. The lighthouse was first established in 1887 and it was automated in 1978. The area was listed as a protected site in 1999.

The steel-hulled barque Skomvær takes her name from the lighthouse.

== Specifications ==
The 31.7-metre (104 ft) tall lighthouse has a red, cast iron, cylindrical tower that stands on top of a circular white stone base. The light is emitted at a height of 47 metres (154 ft) above sea level. The light on top of the tower puts out two white flashes every 30 seconds. The 2,007,300-candela light can be seen for up to 18.7 nautical miles (34.6 km; 21.5 mi) in all directions. The light is on from dusk to sunrise from 4 August until 2 May each year (it is not on during the summers due to the midnight sun in the region). In addition to the light, the tower also emits a Racon signal that is the morse code letter "T".

== See also ==
- Lighthouses in Norway
- List of lighthouses in Norway
