= 167th Street =

167th Street may refer to the following stations of the New York City Subway in the Bronx:

- 167th Street (IRT Jerome Avenue Line); serving the 4 train
- 167th Street (IND Concourse Line); serving the B and D trains
