= 169th meridian west =

Line of longitude

169th meridian west

The meridian 169° west of Greenwich is a line of longitude that extends from the North Pole across the Arctic Ocean, the Pacific Ocean, the Southern Ocean, and Antarctica to the South Pole, crossing a smaller amount of land than any other line of longitude, and is thus generally used as the cut-off point on a lot of map projections.

The 169th meridian west forms a great circle with the 11th meridian east.

== From Pole to Pole ==
Starting at the North Pole and heading south to the South Pole, the 169th meridian west passes through:

Co-ordinates	Country, territory or sea	Notes
90°0′N 169°0′W	Arctic Ocean	
71°50′N 169°0′W	Chukchi Sea	
66°33′N 169°0′W	Bering Sea	
65°49′N 169°0′W	Russia	Chukotka Autonomous Okrug — island of Big Diomede
65°48′N 169°0′W	Bering Sea	Passing just west of Little Diomede Island, Alaska, United States (at 65°45′N 168°56′W)
63°20′N 169°0′W	United States	Alaska — St. Lawrence Island
63°10′N 169°0′W	Bering Sea	
52°52′N 169°0′W	United States	Alaska — Umnak Island
52°51′N 169°0′W	Pacific Ocean	
60°0′S 169°0′W	Southern Ocean	
78°28′S 169°0′W	Antarctica	Ross Dependency, claimed by New Zealand

== See also ==
- 168th meridian west
- 170th meridian west
- 30th meridian east, the meridian that crosses the most land
