= 166th meridian west =

Line of longitude

166th meridian west

The meridian 166° west of Greenwich is a line of longitude that extends from the North Pole across the Arctic Ocean, North America, the Pacific Ocean, the Southern Ocean, and Antarctica to the South Pole.

The 166th meridian west forms a great ellipse with the 14th meridian east.

== From Pole to Pole ==
Starting at the North Pole and heading south to the South Pole, the 166th meridian west passes through:

| Co-ordinates | Country, territory or sea | Notes |
|---|---|---|
| 90°0′N 166°0′W | Arctic Ocean | |
| 71°47′N 166°0′W | Chukchi Sea | |
| 68°52′N 166°0′W | United States | Alaska |
| 68°10′N 166°0′W | Chukchi Sea | |
| 66°33′N 166°0′W | Bering Sea | |
| 66°16′N 166°0′W | United States | Alaska — Seward Peninsula |
| 68°10′N 166°0′W | Bering Sea | Passing just east of Sledge Island, Alaska, United States (at 64°29′N 166°11′W) |
| 62°3′N 166°0′W | United States | Alaska — Krekatok Island, Neragon Island and the mainland |
| 61°32′N 166°0′W | Bering Sea | |
| 60°19′N 166°0′W | United States | Alaska — Nunivak Island |
| 59°52′N 166°0′W | Bering Sea | |
| 54°11′N 166°0′W | United States | Alaska — Akutan Island |
| 54°3′N 166°0′W | Pacific Ocean | Passing just east of Unalga Island, Alaska, United States (at 53°58′N 166°5′W); Passing just east of Sedanka Island, Alaska, United States (at 53°50′N 166°5′W); Passing just east of the French Frigate Shoals, Hawaii, United States (at 23°45′N 166°3′W); Passing just west of Pukapuka atoll, Cook Islands (at 10°55′S 165°52′W) |
| 60°0′S 166°0′W | Southern Ocean | |
| 78°28′S 166°0′W | Antarctica | Ross Dependency, claimed by New Zealand |

== See also ==
- 165th meridian west
- 167th meridian west
