= 166th Division (2nd Formation) (People's Republic of China) =

5th Cavalry Division (1949-51) 166th Division (1951–52)
- Active: 1949.4 - 1952.5
- Country: People's Republic of China
- Branch: People's Liberation Army
- Type: Division
- Role: Cavalry, Infantry
- Engagements: Chinese Civil War

The 5th Cavalry Division (Chinese: 骑兵第5师)(1st Formation) was created in April 1949 basing on Cavalry Division of Jichareliao Military Region. Its history could be traced to Zhude Cavalry Division of Jireliao Military Region formed on November 30, 1946.

The division was composed of 13th, 14th and 15th Cavalry Regiments. It took part in several major battles during the Chinese Civil War, including the Liaoshen Campaign and Pingjin Campaign.

The division took part in the ceremony of the Surrender of Beiping.

From June 3, 1949 to February 24, 1950, the division moved to Henan province to eliminate the remnants of Republic of China Army.

On April 2, 1950, the division was inspected by the Command in Chief Zhu De.

From October 1950, the division was put under command of Liaoxi Military District.

In March 1951, the division was renamed as 166th Division(Chinese: 第166师). All three cavalry regiments were converted to infantry regiments. The division was then composed of:

- 496th Infantry Regiment;
- 497th Infantry Regiment;
- 498th Infantry Regiment.

In May 1952, the division was disbanded. All its three regiments became 7th, 8th and 9th Independent Infantry Regiments of Northeastern Military Region.
