= 166th meridian east =

Line of longitude

166th meridian east

The meridian 166° east of Greenwich is a line of longitude that extends from the North Pole across the Arctic Ocean, Asia, the Pacific Ocean, the Southern Ocean, and Antarctica to the South Pole.

The 166th meridian east forms a great ellipse with the 14th meridian west.

== From Pole to Pole ==
Starting at the North Pole and heading south to the South Pole, the 166th meridian east passes through:

Co-ordinates	Country, territory or sea	Notes
90°0′N 166°0′E	Arctic Ocean	
74°54′N 166°0′E	East Siberian Sea	
69°32′N 166°0′E	Russia	Chukotka Autonomous Okrug; Kamchatka Krai — from 64°33′N 166°0′E
60°21′N 166°0′E	Bering Sea	
55°22′N 166°0′E	Russia	Kamchatka Krai — Bering Island
55°10′N 166°0′E	Pacific Ocean	
10°11′N 166°0′E	Marshall Islands	Wotho Atoll
10°3′N 166°0′E	Pacific Ocean	Passing between the atolls of Ujae (at 8°56′N 165°45′E) and Lae (at 8°56′N 166°12′E), Marshall Islands; Passing just west of the Reef Islands, Solomon Islands (at 10°12′S 166°10′E); Passing just east of the island of Tinakula, Solomon Islands (at 10°24′S 165°46′E)
10°40′S 166°0′E	Solomon Islands	Islands of Nendo and Nibanga
10°50′S 166°0′E	Coral Sea	
21°27′S 166°0′E	New Caledonia	
21°59′S 166°0′E	Coral Sea	
24°5′S 166°0′E	Pacific Ocean	
50°43′S 166°0′E	New Zealand	Auckland Island and Adams Island
50°54′S 166°0′E	Pacific Ocean	
60°0′S 166°0′E	Southern Ocean	
70°41′S 166°0′E	Antarctica	Ross Dependency, claimed by New Zealand
74°8′S 166°0′E	Southern Ocean	Ross Sea
77°54′S 166°0′E	Antarctica	Ross Dependency, claimed by New Zealand

== See also ==
- 165th meridian east
- 167th meridian east
