= Røstlandet =

Island in Røst, Norway

Røstlandet Røst
- Interactive map of Røstlandet; Røst

Geography
- Location: Nordland, Norway
- Coordinates: 67.5216°N 12.1045°E
- Area: 3.6 km^{2} (1.4 sq mi)
- Length: 2.7 km (1.68 mi)
- Width: 2.1 km (1.3 mi)
- Highest point: 11 m

Administration
- Norway
- County: Nordland
- Municipality: Røst Municipality

Demographics
- Population: 480 (2016)
- Pop. density: 133/km^{2} (344/sq mi)

Røstlandet or simply Røst is an island in Røst Municipality in Nordland county, Norway. The 3.6-square-kilometre (1.4 sq mi) island makes up the majority of the land of the municipality and is home to most of its residents. The island is very low and marshy, with the highest point on the island only reaching 11 metres (36 ft) above sea level. There are many small lakes on the island, many of the wetlands areas on the island are located in a protected nature reserve.

The village of Røstlandet is a fishing village that covers the southeastern part of the island. Røst Airport is located on the northern part of the island. Røst Church is located in the village. The remaining uninhabited parts of the island are dominated by sheep farming and racks for drying fish.

Skomvær Lighthouse is located about 15 kilometres (9.3 mi) southwest of the island.

== Media gallery ==
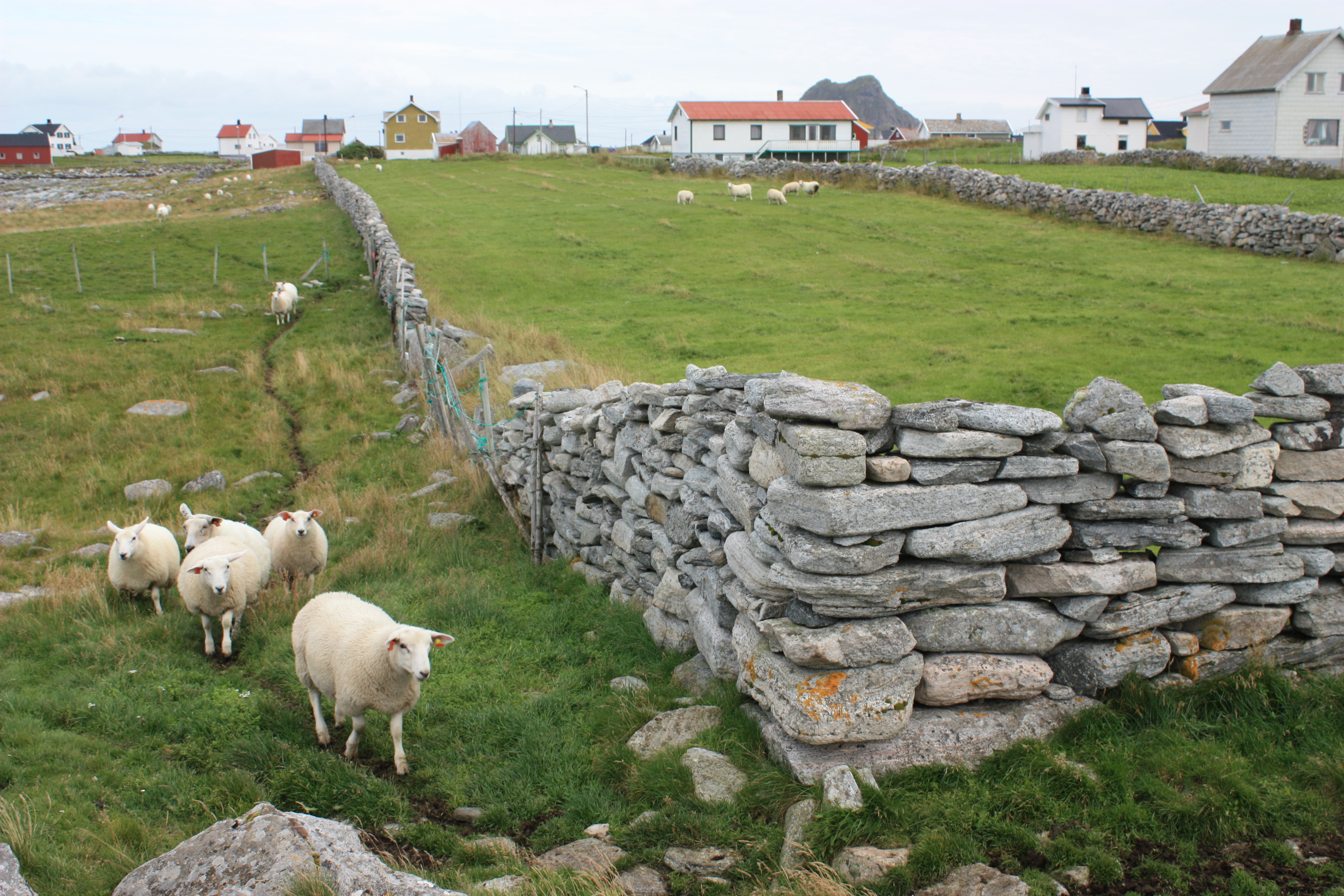

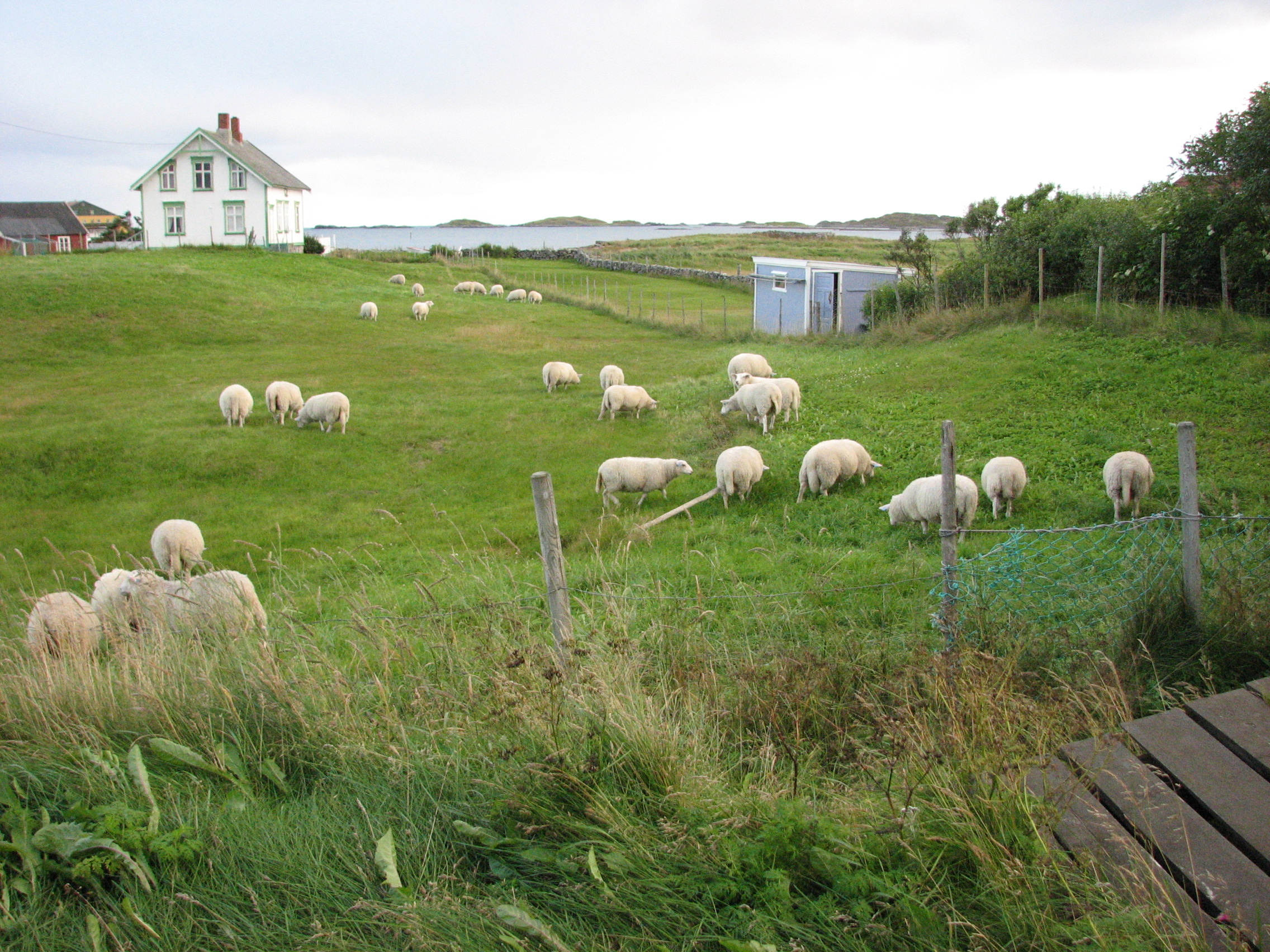

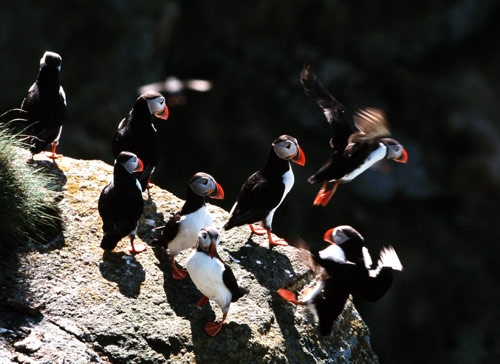

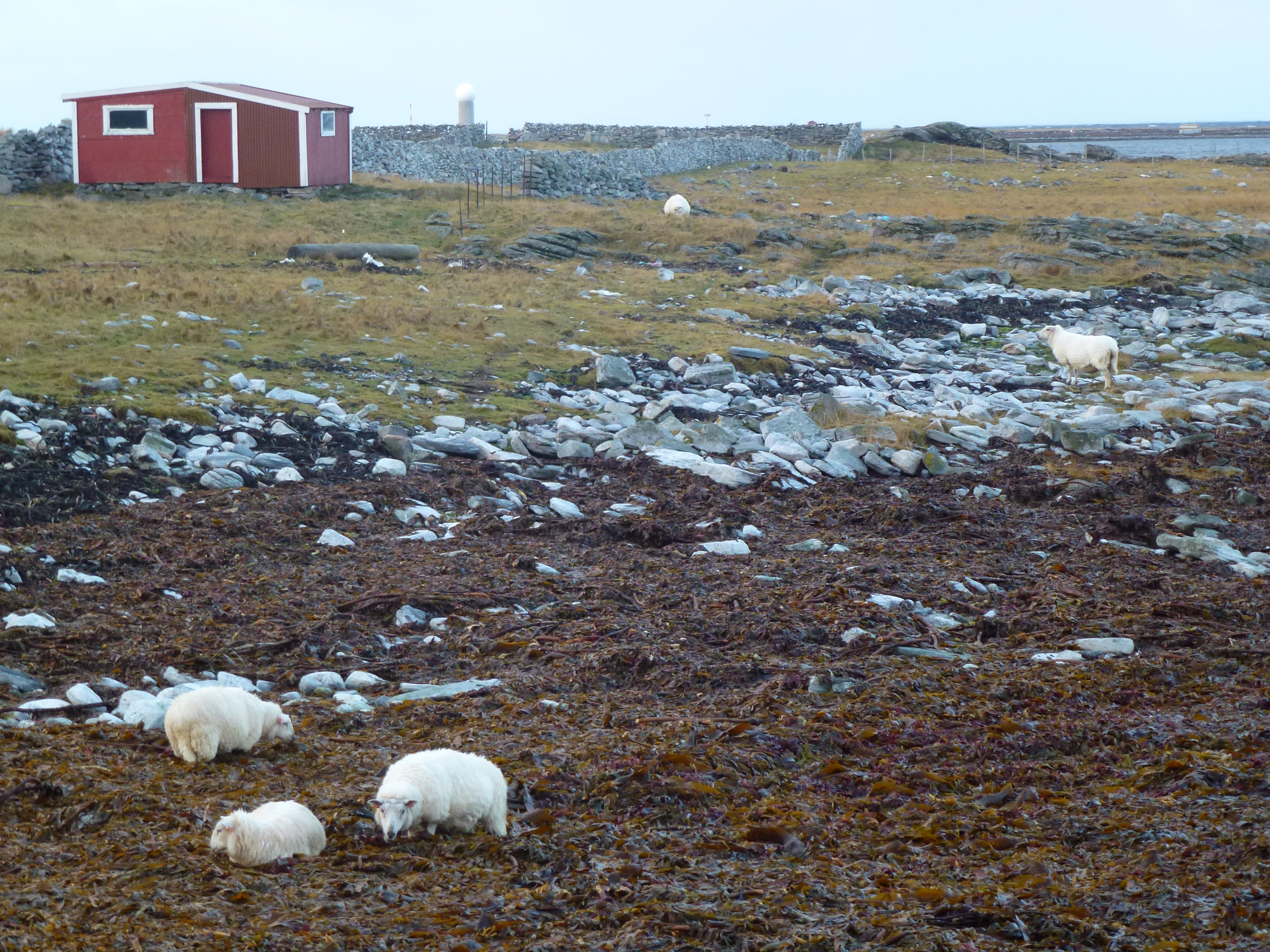

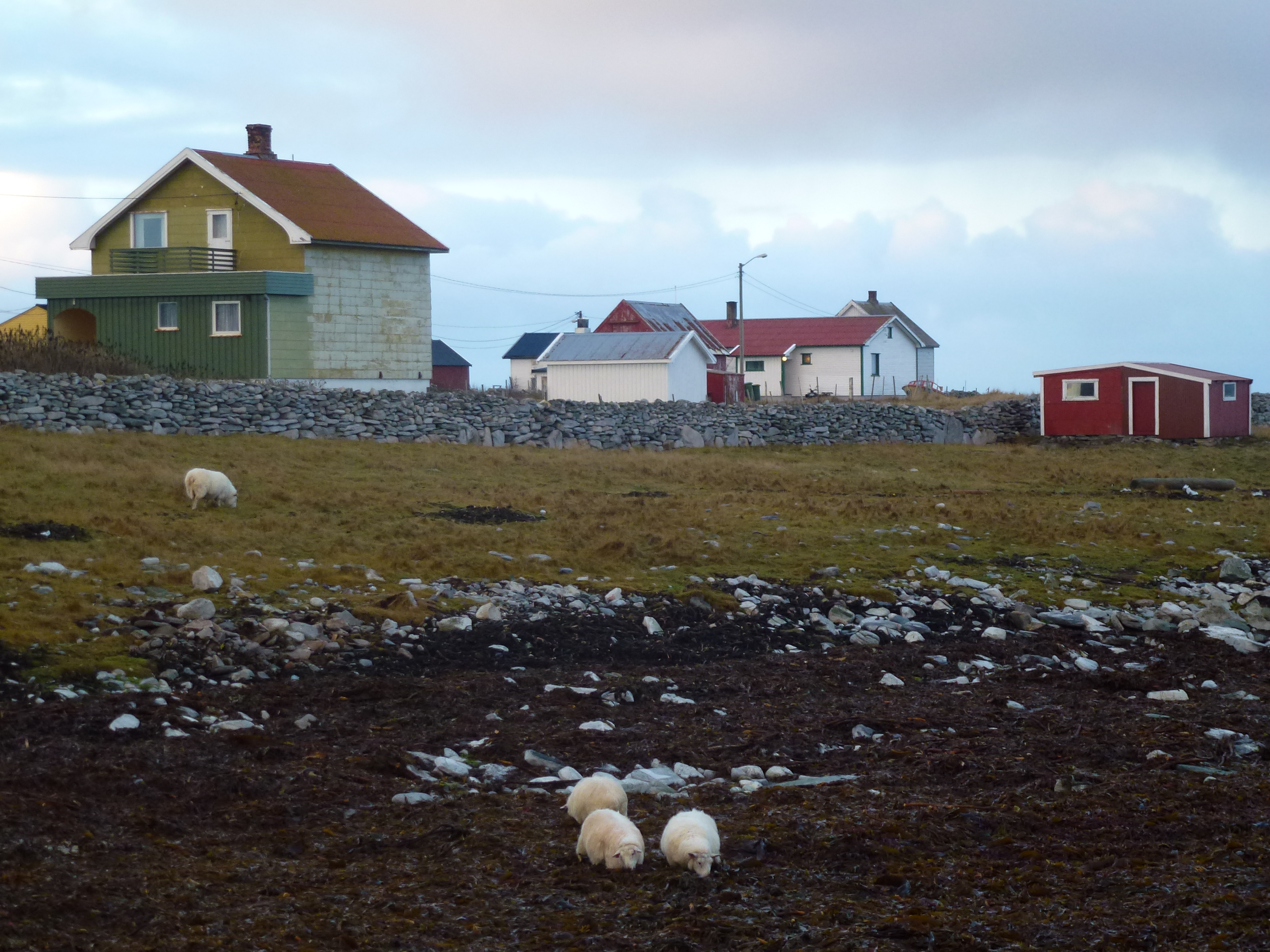

== See also ==
- List of islands of Norway
