= 167th meridian west =

Line of longitude

167th meridian west

The meridian 167° west of Greenwich is a line of longitude that extends from the North Pole across the Arctic Ocean, North America, the Pacific Ocean, the Southern Ocean, and Antarctica to the South Pole.

The 167th meridian west forms a great circle with the 13th meridian east.

== From Pole to Pole ==
Starting at the North Pole and heading south to the South Pole, the 167th meridian west passes through:

Co-ordinates	Country, territory or sea	Notes
90°0′N 167°0′W	Arctic Ocean	
71°48′N 167°0′W	Chukchi Sea	Passing just west of Point Hope, Alaska, United States (at 68°21′N 166°50′W)
66°33′N 167°0′W	Bering Sea	
66°0′N 167°0′W	United States	Alaska — Seward Peninsula
65°22′N 167°0′W	Bering Sea	
60°13′N 167°0′W	United States	Alaska — Nunivak Island
59°59′N 167°0′W	Bering Sea	
53°57′N 167°0′W	United States	Alaska — Unalaska Island
53°25′N 167°0′W	Pacific Ocean	The meridian defines the eastern maritime boundary of the Cook Islands from 8°0′S 167°0′W to 23°0′S 167°0′W
60°0′S 167°0′W	Southern Ocean	
78°28′S 167°0′W	Antarctica	Ross Dependency, claimed by New Zealand

== See also ==
- 166th meridian west
- 168th meridian west
