= 167th meridian east =

Line of longitude

167th meridian east

The meridian 167° east of Greenwich is a line of longitude that extends from the North Pole across the Arctic Ocean, Asia, the Pacific Ocean, New Zealand, the Southern Ocean, and Antarctica to the South Pole.

The 167th meridian east forms a great circle with the 13th meridian west.

== From Pole to Pole ==
Starting at the North Pole and heading south to the South Pole, the 167th meridian east passes through:

Co-ordinates	Country, territory or sea	Notes
90°0′N 167°0′E	Arctic Ocean	
74°39′N 167°0′E	East Siberian Sea	
69°29′N 167°0′E	Russia	Chukotka Autonomous Okrug; Kamchatka Krai — from 64°33′N 167°0′E
60°18′N 167°0′E	Bering Sea	
54°45′N 167°0′E	Pacific Ocean	
11°28′N 167°0′E	Marshall Islands	Rongelap Atoll
11°22′N 167°0′E	Pacific Ocean	
9°19′N 167°0′E	Marshall Islands	Kwajalein Atoll
9°14′N 167°0′E	Pacific Ocean	Passing just east of Nauru (at 0°31′S 166°56′E)
9°48′S 167°0′E	Coral Sea	Passing just west of the Duff Islands, Solomon Islands (at 9°50′S 167°6′E); Passing just east of the Vanikolo Islands, Solomon Islands (at 11°38′S 166°59′E); Passing just east of the Torres Islands, Vanuatu (at 13°25′S 166°42′E); Passing just west of the Banks Islands, Vanuatu (at 13°31′S 167°17′E)
14°56′S 167°0′E	Vanuatu	Island of Espiritu Santo
15°35′S 167°0′E	Coral Sea	Passing just west of the island of Malo, Vanuatu (at 15°40′S 167°4′E); Passing just west of the island of Malakula, Vanuatu (at 16°5′S 167°9′E); Passing just west of the island of Lifou, New Caledonia (at 20°55′S 167°1′E)
22°14′S 167°0′E	New Caledonia	
22°20′S 167°0′E	Coral Sea	
23°15′S 167°0′E	Pacific Ocean	
45°7′S 167°0′E	New Zealand	South Island
46°13′S 167°0′E	Pacific Ocean	
60°0′S 167°0′E	Southern Ocean	
70°48′S 167°0′E	Antarctica	Ross Dependency, claimed by New Zealand
73°36′S 167°0′E	Southern Ocean	Ross Sea
77°17′S 167°0′E	Antarctica	Ross Dependency, claimed by New Zealand

== See also ==
- 166th meridian east
- 168th meridian east
