= 168th meridian west =

Line of longitude

168th meridian west

The meridian 168° west of Greenwich is a line of longitude that extends from the North Pole across the Arctic Ocean, North America, the Pacific Ocean, the Southern Ocean, and Antarctica to the South Pole.

The 168th meridian west forms a great circle with the 12th meridian east.

== From Pole to Pole ==
Starting at the North Pole and heading south to the South Pole, the 168th meridian west passes through:

Co-ordinates	Country, territory or sea	Notes
90°0′N 168°0′W	Arctic Ocean	
71°49′N 168°0′W	Chukchi Sea	
66°33′N 168°0′W	Bering Sea	
65°43′N 168°0′W	United States	Alaska — Seward Peninsula
65°33′N 168°0′W	Bering Sea	Passing just east of King Island, Alaska, United States (at 64°58′N 168°2′W)
53°33′N 168°0′W	United States	Alaska — Umnak Island
53°19′N 168°0′W	Pacific Ocean	Passing just east of Rose Atoll, American Samoa (at 14°33′S 168°9′W)
60°0′S 168°0′W	Southern Ocean	
78°28′S 168°0′W	Antarctica	Ross Dependency, claimed by New Zealand

== See also ==
- 167th meridian west
- 169th meridian west
