= 168th meridian east =

Line of longitude

168th meridian east

The meridian 168° east of Greenwich is a line of longitude that extends from the North Pole across the Arctic Ocean, Asia, the Pacific Ocean, New Zealand, the Southern Ocean, and Antarctica to the South Pole.

The 168th meridian east forms a great circle with the 12th meridian west.

== From Pole to Pole ==
Starting at the North Pole and heading south to the South Pole, the 168th meridian east passes through:

Co-ordinates	Country, territory or sea	Notes
90°0′N 168°0′E	Arctic Ocean	
74°25′N 168°0′E	East Siberian Sea	
69°56′N 168°0′E	Russia	Chukotka Autonomous Okrug — Ayon Island and the mainland Kamchatka Krai — from 64°17′N 168°0′E
60°32′N 168°0′E	Bering Sea	
54°34′N 168°0′E	Russia	Kamchatka Krai — Medny Island
54°32′N 168°0′E	Pacific Ocean	Passing just east of Kwajalein Atoll, Marshall Islands (at 8°54′N 167°47′E)
8°11′N 168°0′E	Marshall Islands	Namu Atoll
8°7′N 168°0′E	Pacific Ocean	Passing just west of Namdrik Atoll, Marshall Islands (at 5°38′N 168°5′E)
14°12′S 168°0′E	Coral Sea	Passing just west of the island of Méré Lava, Vanuatu (at 14°25′S 168°1′E); Passing just west of the island of Maewo, Vanuatu (at 14°55′S 168°5′E)
15°17′S 168°0′E	Vanuatu	Aoba Island
15°19′S 168°0′E	Coral Sea	Passing just west of Pentecost Island, Vanuatu (at 16°40′S 168°6′E)
16°12′S 168°0′E	Vanuatu	Island of Ambrym
16°19′S 168°0′E	Coral Sea	Passing just east of the island of Malakula, Vanuatu (at 16°28′S 167°49′E); Passing just west of the island of Epi, Vanuatu (at 16°41′S 168°7′E); Passing just west of the island of Efate, Vanuatu (at 17°42′S 168°9′E)
21°27′S 168°0′E	New Caledonia	Island of Maré
21°39′S 168°0′E	Pacific Ocean	Passing just west of Norfolk Island (at 29°0′S 168°1′E)
44°19′S 168°0′E	New Zealand	South Island
46°23′S 168°0′E	Foveaux Strait	
46°46′S 168°0′E	New Zealand	Stewart Island / Rakiura
47°7′S 168°0′E	Pacific Ocean	
60°0′S 168°0′E	Southern Ocean	
71°8′S 168°0′E	Antarctica	Ross Dependency, claimed by New Zealand
73°33′S 168°0′E	Southern Ocean	Ross Sea
77°25′S 168°0′E	Antarctica	Ross Dependency, claimed by New Zealand

== See also ==
- 167th meridian east
- 169th meridian east
