= 172nd Division =

172nd Division may refer to:

- 172nd Division (People's Republic of China)
- 172nd Rifle Division, Soviet Union

== See also ==
- List of military divisions by number
- 172nd Brigade (disambiguation)
- 172nd Regiment (disambiguation)
- 172nd (disambiguation)
