= 172nd =

172nd is the ordinal form of the number 172. 172nd or One hundred and seventy-second may also refer to:

- A fraction, 1/172, equal to one of 172 equal parts

== Geography ==
- 172nd meridian east, a line of longitude
- 172nd meridian west, a line of longitude

== Military ==
- 172nd Brigade (disambiguation)
- 172nd Division (People's Republic of China)
- 172nd Rifle Division, Red Army
- 172nd Regiment (disambiguation)

== See also ==
- June 21, 172nd day of the year in a standard year
