= 10th meridian =

10th meridian may refer to:

- 10th meridian east, a line of longitude east of the Greenwich Meridian
- 10th meridian west, a line of longitude west of the Greenwich Meridian
