= 8th meridian =

8th meridian may refer to:

- 8th meridian east, a line of longitude east of the Greenwich Meridian
- 8th meridian west, a line of longitude west of the Greenwich Meridian
