= 170th meridian =

170th meridian may refer to:

- 170th meridian east, a line of longitude east of the Greenwich Meridian
- 170th meridian west, a line of longitude west of the Greenwich Meridian

170th meridian west	170th meridian east
