= 172nd meridian =

172nd meridian can refer to:

- 172nd meridian east, a line of longitude east of the Greenwich Meridian
- 172nd meridian west, a line of longitude west of the Greenwich Meridian

172nd meridian west	172nd meridian east
