= 9th meridian =

9th meridian may refer to:

- 9th meridian east, a line of longitude east of the Greenwhich Meridian
- 9th meridian west, a line of longitude west of the Greenwhich Meridian
