= 171st Division =

171st Division may refer to:

- 171st Division (People's Republic of China)
- 171st Reserve Division, Wehrmacht, Germany
- 171st Rifle Division, Soviet Union

== See also ==
- List of military divisions by number
- 171st Brigade (disambiguation)
- 171st Regiment (disambiguation)
- 171st (disambiguation)
