= 174th meridian west =

Line of longitude

174th meridian west

The meridian 174° west of Greenwich is a line of longitude that extends from the North Pole across the Arctic Ocean, Asia, the Pacific Ocean, the Southern Ocean, and Antarctica to the South Pole.

The 174th meridian west forms a great circle with the 6th meridian east.

== From Pole to Pole ==
Starting at the North Pole and heading south to the South Pole, the 174th meridian west passes through:

Co-ordinates	Country, territory or sea	Notes
90°0′N 174°0′W	Arctic Ocean	
71°47′N 174°0′W	Chukchi Sea	
67°5′N 174°0′W	Russia	Chukotka Autonomous Okrug — Chukchi Peninsula
66°53′N 174°0′W	Kolyuchinskaya Bay	
66°38′N 174°0′W	Russia	Chukotka Autonomous Okrug — Chukchi Peninsula
64°27′N 174°0′W	Bering Sea	
52°21′N 174°0′W	United States	Alaska — Atka Island and Amlia Island
52°6′N 174°0′W	Pacific Ocean	Passing just west of Lisianski Island, Hawaii, United States (at 26°4′N 173°58′W); Passing just west of the island of Niuatoputapu, Tonga (at 15°58′S 173°46′W); Passing just east of the island of Toku, Tonga (at 18°9′S 174°10′W)
18°34′S 174°0′W	Tonga	Islands of Vavaʻu
18°42′S 174°0′W	Pacific Ocean	
60°0′S 174°0′W	Southern Ocean	
78°26′S 174°0′W	Antarctica	Ross Dependency, claimed by New Zealand

== See also ==
- 173rd meridian west
- 175th meridian west
