= 171st =

171st is the ordinal form of the number 171. 171st or One hundred and seventy-first may also refer to:

- A fraction, 1/171, equal to one of 171 equal parts

== Geography ==
- 171st meridian east, a line of longitude
- 171st meridian west, a line of longitude

== Military ==
- 171st Brigade (disambiguation)
- 171st Division (People's Republic of China)
- 171st Rifle Division, Red Army
- 171st Regiment (disambiguation)

== See also ==
- June 20, 171st day of the year in a standard year
