= 171st meridian =

171st meridian can refer to:

- 171st meridian east, a line of longitude east of the Greenwich Meridian
- 171st meridian west, a line of longitude west of the Greenwich Meridian

171st meridian west	171st meridian east
