= Ioni =

Lake of Chukotka Autonomous Okrug

- Иони / Юнин
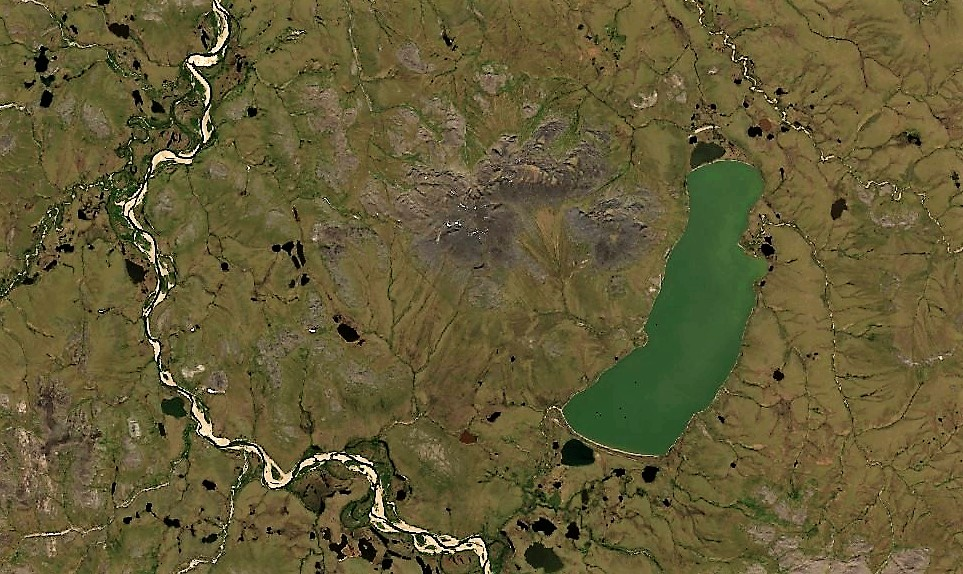
- Ioni and river Ioniveyem Sentinel-2 image

- Location in Chukotka Autonomous Okrug, Russian Far East
- Location: Chukotka Autonomous Okrug
- Coordinates: 65°54′N 173°39′W
- Type: Oligotrophic
- Primary inflows: Priozernaya River
- Primary outflows: Yonaypilgyn
- Catchment area: 193 km^{2} (75 sq mi)
- Basin countries: Russia
- Max. length: 10 km (6.2 mi)
- Max. width: 3 km (1.9 mi)
- Surface area: 27.8 km^{2} (10.7 sq mi)
- Surface elevation: 38 m (125 ft)
- Islands: None

Lake Ioni (Russian: Иони), also known as Yonai (Russian: Ёонай), (Chukot: Юнин, Yunin) is a large freshwater lake in Chukotsky District, Chukotka Autonomous Okrug, Russia. It has an area of 27.8 km^{2} (10.7 sq mi). Currently there are no permanent settlements on the shores of the lake, but there are remains of Stone Age dwellings. Reindeer herders occasionally visit the area, as well as fishermen. The nearest inhabited place is Lorino, located 102 km (63 mi) away.

== Geography ==
The lake is located in the center of the Chukotka Peninsula, south of Kolyuchin Bay. Ioni is the largest lake in its district. It lies in the Mechigmen-Kolyuchin basin, a large intermontane basin of the western part of the Chukotka Mountains.702 m (2,303 ft) high Mount Ioni rises to the NW of the lake.

Ioni is fed by at least five streams originating in the adjacent mountains. The largest is the Priozernaya that flows into the lake from the northeast. River Yonaypilgyn is the outflow of the lake. Ioni is connected by the Yuniwei channel with river Ioniveyem, part of the drainage basin of Kolyuchin Bay.

The lake freezes in the first half of September and stays under ice until June.

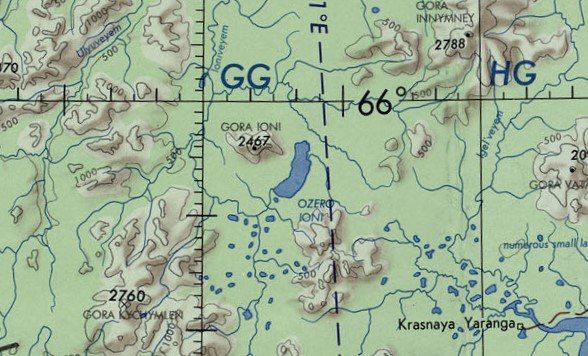
Ioni map section

== Flora and fauna ==
The area surrounding Ioni has low mountain tundra vegetation. The banks of the lake are gently sloping and on the eastern side swampy with hummocks and thermokarst pools. There are no aquatic plants.

Anadromous Dolly Varden char is common in the lake. Other fish species include sardine cisco, Siberian whitefish, broad whitefish, burbot, Arctic grayling, as well as Alaska blackfish in shallow thermokarst ponds.

Migratory birds, such as the snow goose, sandhill crane and emperor goose pass through the area and stop at the lake. But owing to the short relatively warm season Ioni is not a suitable place for nesting.

== See also ==
- List of lakes of Russia
