= Shuttle Radar Topography Mission =

Project to create a digital topographic database of Earth

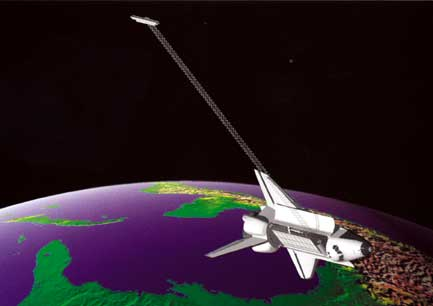
The SRTM was flown on an 11-day mission of the Space Shuttle Endeavour in February 2000.

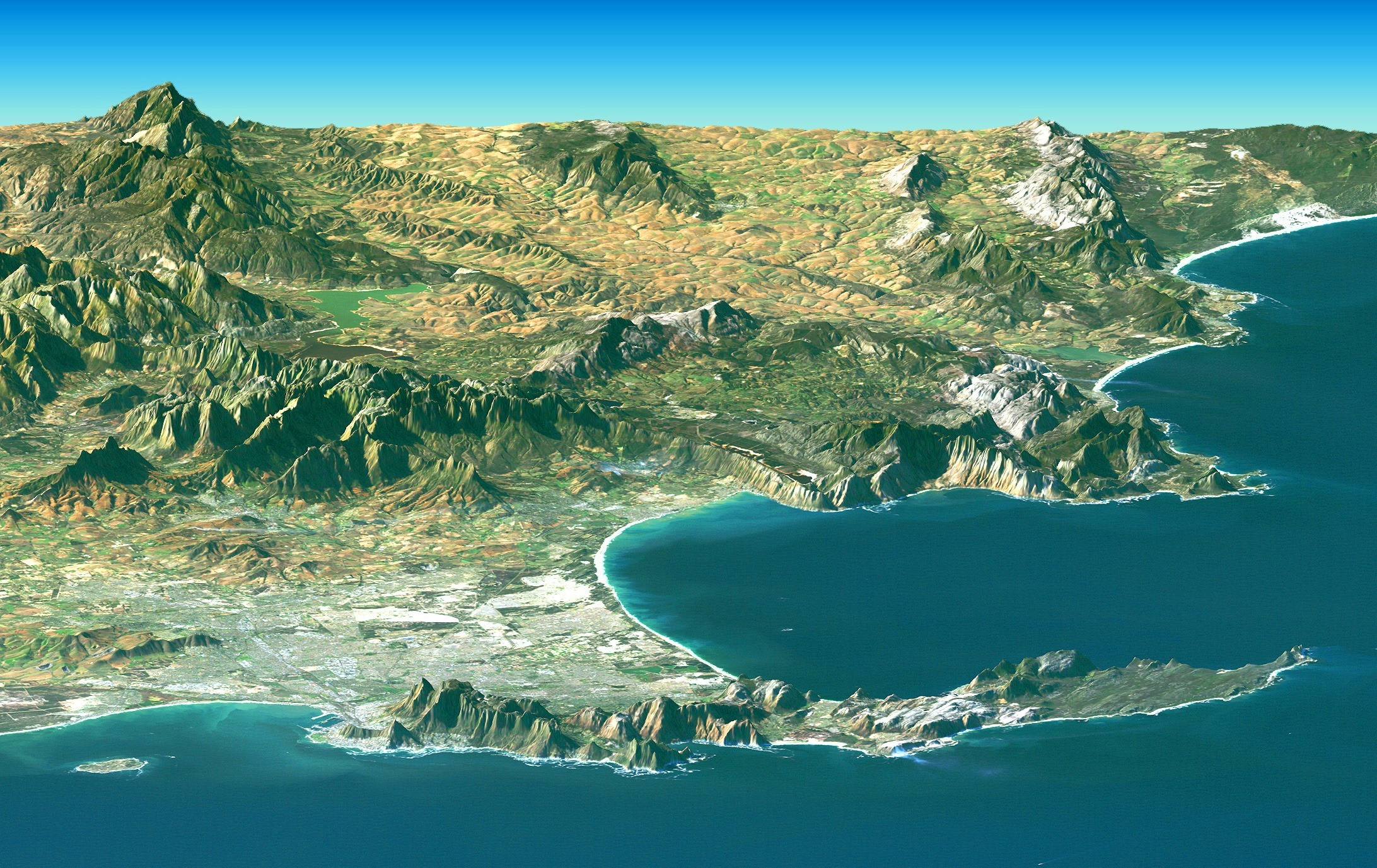
This NASA image used Landsat data to texture-map the surface created using SRTM Elevation data. The Cape Peninsula and Cape of Good Hope, South Africa, are visible in the foreground.

The Shuttle Radar Topography Mission (SRTM) is an international research effort that obtained digital elevation models on a near-global scale from 56°S to 60°N, to generate the most complete high-resolution digital topographic database of Earth prior to the release of the ASTER GDEM in 2009. The technique employed for generating topographic data by radar is known as interferometric synthetic aperture radar. It flew onboard the 11-day STS-99 mission in February 2000.

Intermap Technologies was the prime contractor for processing the interferometric synthetic aperture radar data. The elevation models derived from the SRTM data are used in geographic information systems. They can be downloaded freely over the Internet, and their file format (.hgt) is widely supported.

The Shuttle Radar Topography Mission is an international project spearheaded by the U.S. National Geospatial-Intelligence Agency (NGA), an agency of the U.S. Department of Defense, and the U.S. National Aeronautics and Space Administration (NASA).

== Mission and instrument ==
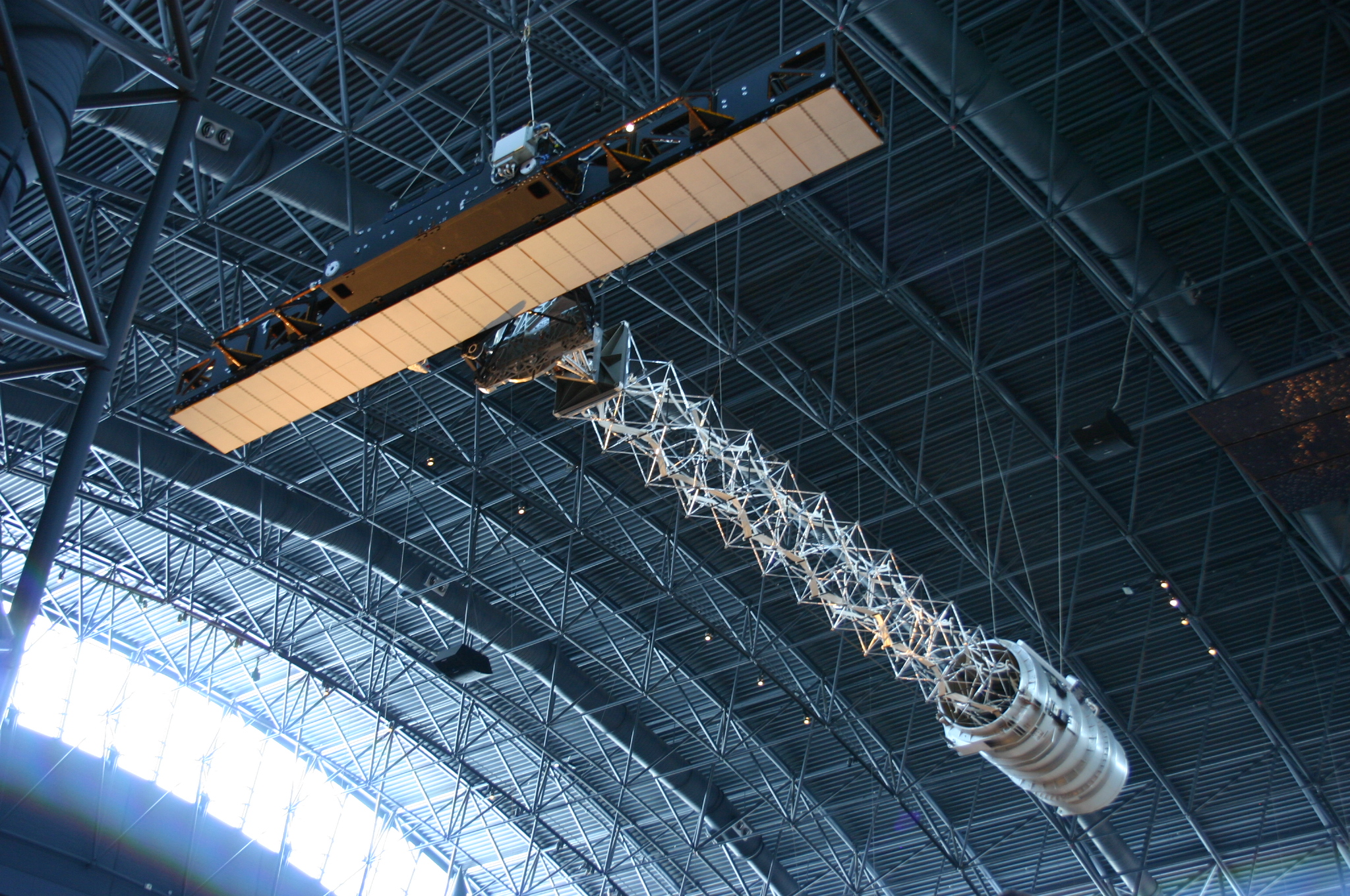
The Shuttle Radar Topography Mission model

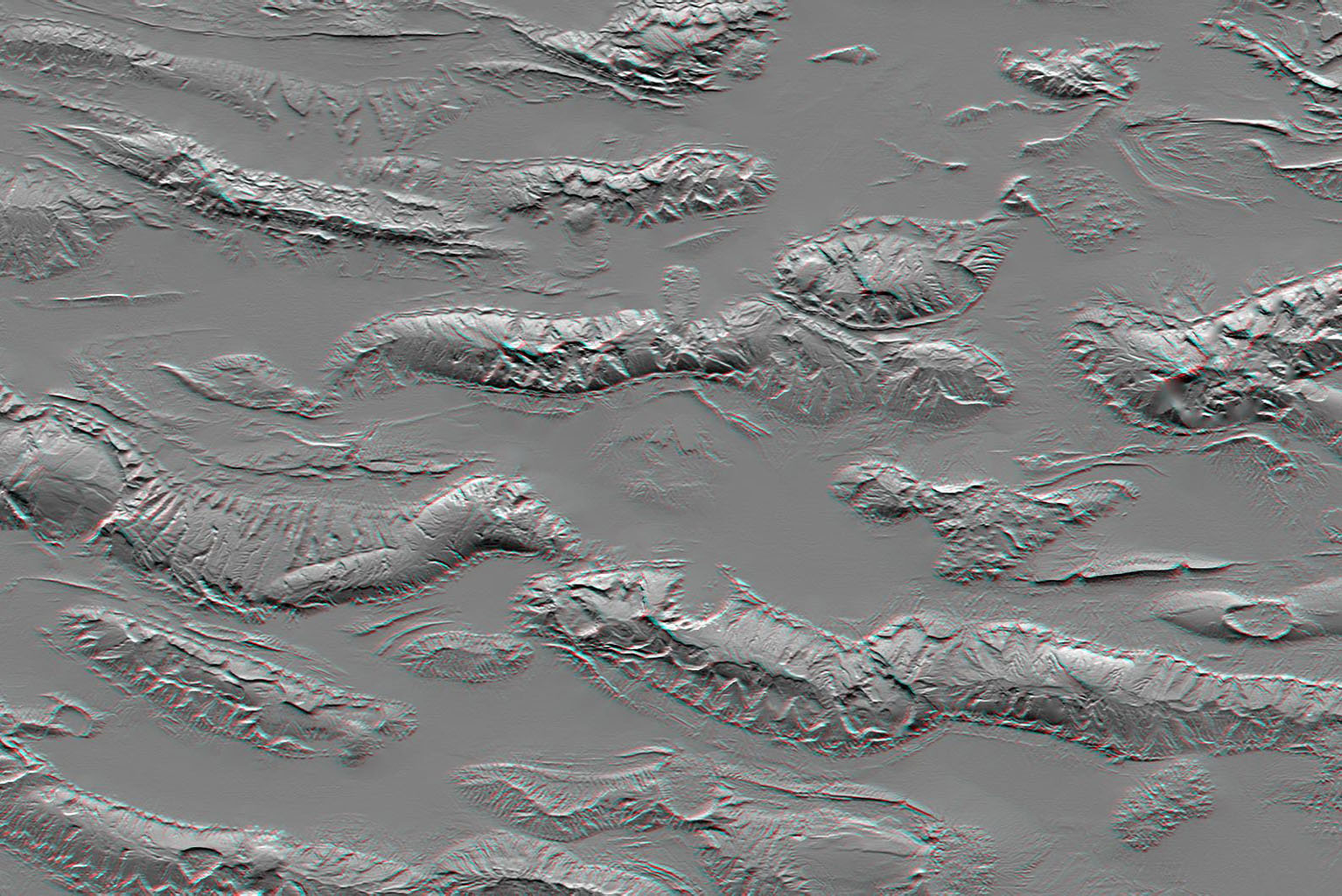
SRTM Shaded Relief Anaglyph of Zagros Mountains.

The mission consists of an interferometric synthetic aperture radar system based on the older Spaceborne Imaging Radar-C/X-band Synthetic Aperture Radar (SIR-C/X-SAR), previously used on the Shuttle in 1994. It features two antennas, a critical change from SIR-C/X-SAR, allowing single-pass interferometry. One antenna was located in the Shuttle's payload bay, like in SIR-C/X-SAR. The other was located on the end of a 60-meter (200-foot) mast that extended from the payload bay once the Shuttle was in space.

Like in SIR-C/X-SAR, the SRTM radar antennas work in both X-band and C-band. C-band provides wider aperature and hence wider coverage under the tracks, whereas the X-band has a narrower aperature but higher resolution. The SRTM mission orbit was designed for the coverage of the American C-band mission, not the German-Italian X-band mission, hence the many gaps in X-band coverage.

NASA transferred the SRTM payload to the Smithsonian National Air and Space Museum in 2003; the canister, mast, and antenna are now on display at the Steven F. Udvar-Hazy Center in Chantilly, Virginia.

== Data processing ==
The American data releases are based on the C-band data whereas the German data releases are based on the X-band data. No merging of the two bands have been done. All C-band processing was done on the 1-arcsecond (1″) resolution level.

=== No-data areas ===
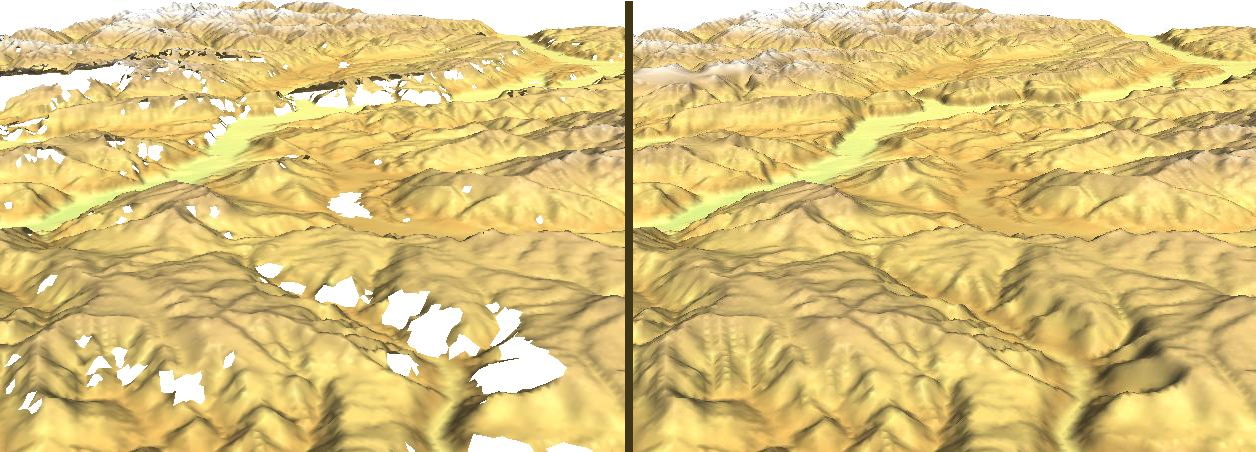
SRTM void filling with spline interpolation in GRASS GIS.

The C-band elevation datasets are affected by mountain and desert no-data areas. These amount to no more than 0.2% of the total area surveyed, but can be a problem in areas of very high relief. They affect all summits over 8,000 meters, most summits over 7,000 meters, many Alpine and similar summits and ridges, and many gorges and canyons. There are some SRTM data sources which have filled these data voids, but some of these have used only interpolation from surrounding data, and may therefore be very inaccurate. If the voids are large, or completely cover summit or ridge areas, no interpolation algorithms will give satisfactory results.

== C-band digital elevation model ==
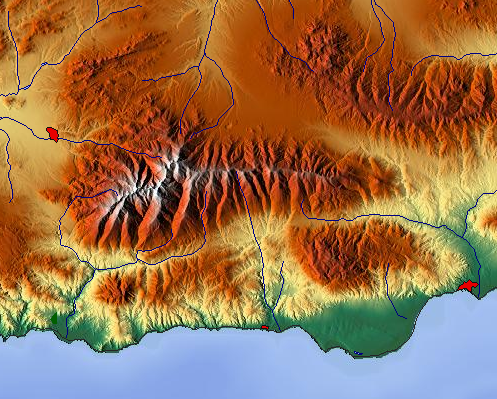
Relief map of Sierra Nevada, Spain

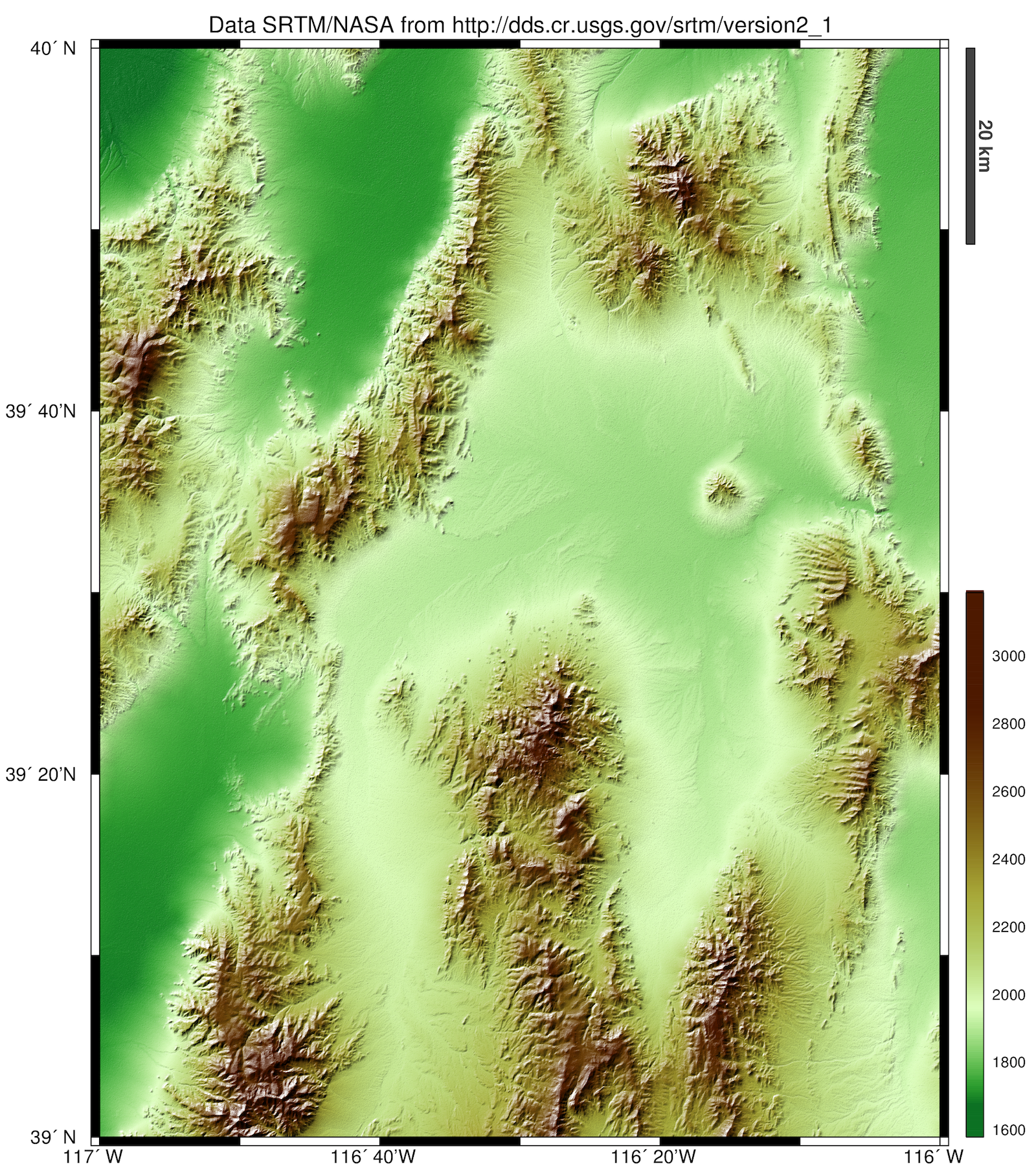
Example of relief map from SRTM1 (central Nevada)

The elevation models are arranged into tiles, each covering one degree of latitude and one degree of longitude, named according to their south western corners. For example, "n45e006" stretches from 45°N 6°E to 46°N 7°E and "s45w006" from 45°S 6°W to 44°S 5°W. The resolution of the raw data is one arcsecond (1″, 30 m along the equator) and coverage includes Africa, Europe, North America, South America, Asia, and Australia. For the rest of the world, only three arcsecond (3″, 90 m along the equator) data are available.

Each 1″ tile has 3,601 rows, each consisting of 3,601 16 bit bigendian cells. The dimensions of the 3″ tiles are 1201 1201. The original SRTM elevations were calculated relative to the WGS84 ellipsoid and then the EGM96 geoid separation values were added to convert to heights relative to the geoid for all the released products.

=== NASA/USGS versions ===
The USGS SRTM data is based on NASA's SIR-C instrument. It is available in the following versions from NASA:

- Version 1 (2003–2004) is almost the raw data.
- Version 2.1 (~2005) is an edited version of v1. Artifacts are removed, but large voids are not yet filled. There are 1-arcsecond (1″) data over the US.
- Version 3 (2013), also known as SRTM Plus, is void-filled. It features global 3″ data and US 1″ data. It was released by NASA LP DAAC in November 2013. Voids were filled primarily from ASTER GDEM2, and secondarily from USGS GMTED2010 – or USGS National Elevation Dataset (NED) for the United States (except Alaska) and northernmost Mexico according to the announcement.
  - SRTM-GL1 (2014), global 1-arcsecond (30 meter) release sharing the "version 3" mark.

The terminology regarding versions and resolutions can be confusing. "SRTM1" and "SRTM3" refers to the resolutions in 1 and 3 arc-seconds, not the versions of the format. On the other hand, "SRTM4.1" refers to a specific filled version by CGIAR-CSI. It is recommended to add a "v" in front of the version number to disambiguate.

The National Geospatial-Intelligence Agency is responsible for most of the data cleanup work seen in version 2.1. It maintains its own high-resolution version and a number of undisclosed void-filled versions containing data from additional sources. Such an undisclosed version was used to fill the voids in ASTER GDEM2, which was in turn used to fill the voids in SRTM version 3.

==== Highest resolution global release ====
SRTM-GL1 is a void-filled digital elevation model with 1-arcsecond (30 meter) resolution, or alternatively a high-resolution version of "SRTM version 3". It was released in 2014. It is available from the United States Geological Survey web site and the NASA data catalog.

The United States Government announced on September 23, 2014 over a United Nations Climate Summit that the highest possible resolution of global topographic data derived from the SRTM mission will be released to public. Before the end of the same year, a 1-arc second global digital elevation model (30 meters) was released. Most parts of the world have been covered by this dataset ranging from 54°S to 60°N latitude except for the Middle East and North Africa area. Missing coverage of the Middle East was completed in August 2015.

Jonathan de Ferranti published a short review of the new SRTM-GL1 data product in 2015. The effective resolution is about 50 metres, compared with 100 meters for versions 1 and 2 of ASTER GDEM. Voids remain around Mount Everest and the Swiss/Italian Matterhorn. There are some artificial details (bumps and pits), but at a lower amplitude than ASTER GDEM.

=== Third-party derivatives ===
==== Void-filled SRTM datasets ====
Groups of scientists have worked on algorithms to fill the voids of the original SRTM (v2.1) data. Three datasets offer global coverage void-filled SRTM data at full (3-arcsecond) resolution:

- The CGIAR-CSI version 4 provides global coverage using interpolation. The latest version is 4.1 of 2007. The resolution is 3″ or 90 m. Data sources include SRTM version 2 (3″) and a number of auxiliary DEMs of comparable resolution.
- The USGS HydroSHEDS 3″ (90 m) dataset was generated for hydrological applications and is suitable for consistent drainage and water flow information. References are provided on the algorithms used and quality assessment. HydroSHEDS has since been spun off into its own website with many derived products. As of December 2025, a 12 m HydroSHEDS v2 based on TanDEM-X data is being worked on.
- The void-filled SRTM data from Viewfinder Panoramas by Jonathan de Ferranti are high quality at full SRTM resolution. The data is filled using local survey maps and photographs. The OpenTopoMap website uses this fill. 3″ and 15″ resolution globally, with 1″ resolution for: USA, Canada, Europe, Antarctica, New Zealand, Greenland, Scandinavia (last updated 2022). Future 1″ data will be based primarily on SRTM-GL1.

==== Cleaned terrain ====
Due to how radar works, the SRTM data is contaminated by non-terrain features such as trees and buildings.

Geoscience Australia released a derived 1″ dataset with trees and other vegetation features removed covering Australia in November 2011 under the CC-BY 4.0 license. There are three versions: one deriving from direct removal of vegetation using vegetation maps, one derived from smoothing of the former, and one derived by hydrological enforcement (i.e. adjusting the elevation to match known water flow paths) of the smoothed version.

=== Users ===
In early June 2011, there were 750,000 confirmed users of SRTM topography dataset. Users in 221 countries have accessed the site.

== X-band digital elevation model ==
The SRTM also carries the X-SAR instrument operated by the German Aerospace Center (DLR) and Italian Space Agency (ASI). The resulting dataset is usually called SRTM/X-SAR, or SRTMX for short. The grid resolution is high at 25 meters, but it has many gaps due to the narrower instrument aperture (only capturing 50 km wide areas). The data was made public in May 2011. A visualization of SRTM/X-SAR coverage is available from the EOC Geoservice of the Earth Observation Center (EOC) of the German Aerospace Center (DLR), which also offers downloads.

== See also ==
- Synthetic aperture radar
- Interferometric Synthetic Aperture Radar
- Digital elevation model
- National Geospatial-Intelligence Agency
- Advanced Spaceborne Thermal Emission and Reflection Radiometer
- SRTM Water Body Data
- WorldDEM private data with higher resolution, from newer satellite TerraSAR-X-TanDEM-X
