= 175th meridian west =

Line of longitude

175th meridian west

The meridian 175° west of Greenwich is a line of longitude that extends from the North Pole across the Arctic Ocean, Asia, the Pacific Ocean, the Southern Ocean, and Antarctica to the South Pole.

The 175th meridian west forms a great circle with the 5th meridian east.

== From Pole to Pole ==
Starting at the North Pole and heading south to the South Pole, the 175th meridian west passes through:

Co-ordinates	Country, territory or sea	Notes
90°0′N 175°0′W	Arctic Ocean	
71°46′N 175°0′W	Chukchi Sea	
67°27′N 175°0′W	Russia	Chukotka Autonomous Okrug — Chukchi Peninsula
64°47′N 175°0′W	Bering Sea	Passing just east of Koniuji Island, Alaska, United States (at 52°13′N 175°6′W)
52°5′N 175°0′W	United States	Alaska — Atka Island
52°1′N 175°0′W	Pacific Ocean	Passing just east of the island of Kao, Tonga (at 19°39′S 175°1′W); Passing just east of the island of Tofua, Tonga (at 19°45′S 175°2′W)
21°2′S 175°0′W	Tonga	'Ata Island
21°3′S 175°0′W	Pacific Ocean	Passing just east of the islands of Tongatapu, Tonga (at 21°9′S 175°2′W); Passing just west of the island of ʻEua, Tonga (at 21°23′S 174°58′W)
60°0′S 175°0′W	Southern Ocean	
78°27′S 175°0′W	Antarctica	Ross Dependency, claimed by New Zealand

== See also ==
- 174th meridian west
- 176th meridian west
