= 169th Division =

169th Division may refer to:

- 169th Division (People's Republic of China)
- 169th Infantry Division (Wehrmacht), Germany
- 169th Rifle Division, Soviet Union

== See also ==
- List of military divisions by number
- 169th Brigade (disambiguation)
- 169th Regiment (disambiguation)
- 169th Squadron (disambiguation)
- 169th (disambiguation)
