= Serykh Gusey Islands =

Island group in Chukchi Sea, Russia

Russian: Острова Серых Гусей
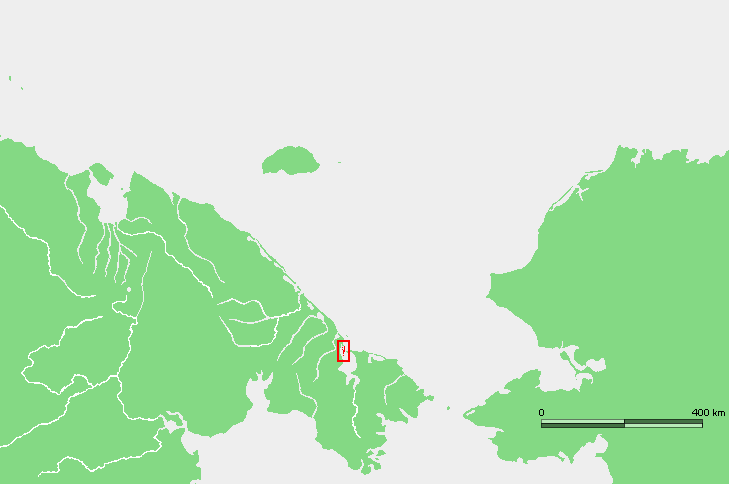
- Location of the Serykh Gusey Islands off the Kolyuchin Bay

Geography
- Location: Kolyuchin Bay, Chukchi Sea
- Coordinates: 67.02°N 174.666°W
- Length: 12 km (7.5 mi)

Administration
- Russia

Demographics
- Population: 0

The Serykh Gusey Islands (Острова Серых Гусей, Ostrova Serykh Gusey; "Grey Geese Islands") is an island group in the Chukchi Sea, located northwest of the shores of the Kolyuchin Bay. Administratively this island group belongs to the Chukotka Autonomous Okrug of the Russian Federation.

== Geography ==
The islands are in the area of the Belyaka Spit, which encloses the Kolyuchin Bay, isolating it from the Chukchi Sea. The Serykh Gusey Islands are aligned from north to south, being on average about 5 km (3.1 mi) from the coast of the Chukotka Peninsula.

Yuzhnyy Island is the largest in the Serykh Gusey group, being about 12 km (7.5 mi) in length. The area is marked by sandy flats, beaches and dry crowberry (Empetrum nigrum) tundra. Shingle beaches give way to flat, turfy surfaces. Yuzhnyy Island is dotted with small brackish pools.

The waters around these coastal islands are frozen for about nine or ten months on a yearly average, so that they are merged with the mainland most of the year.

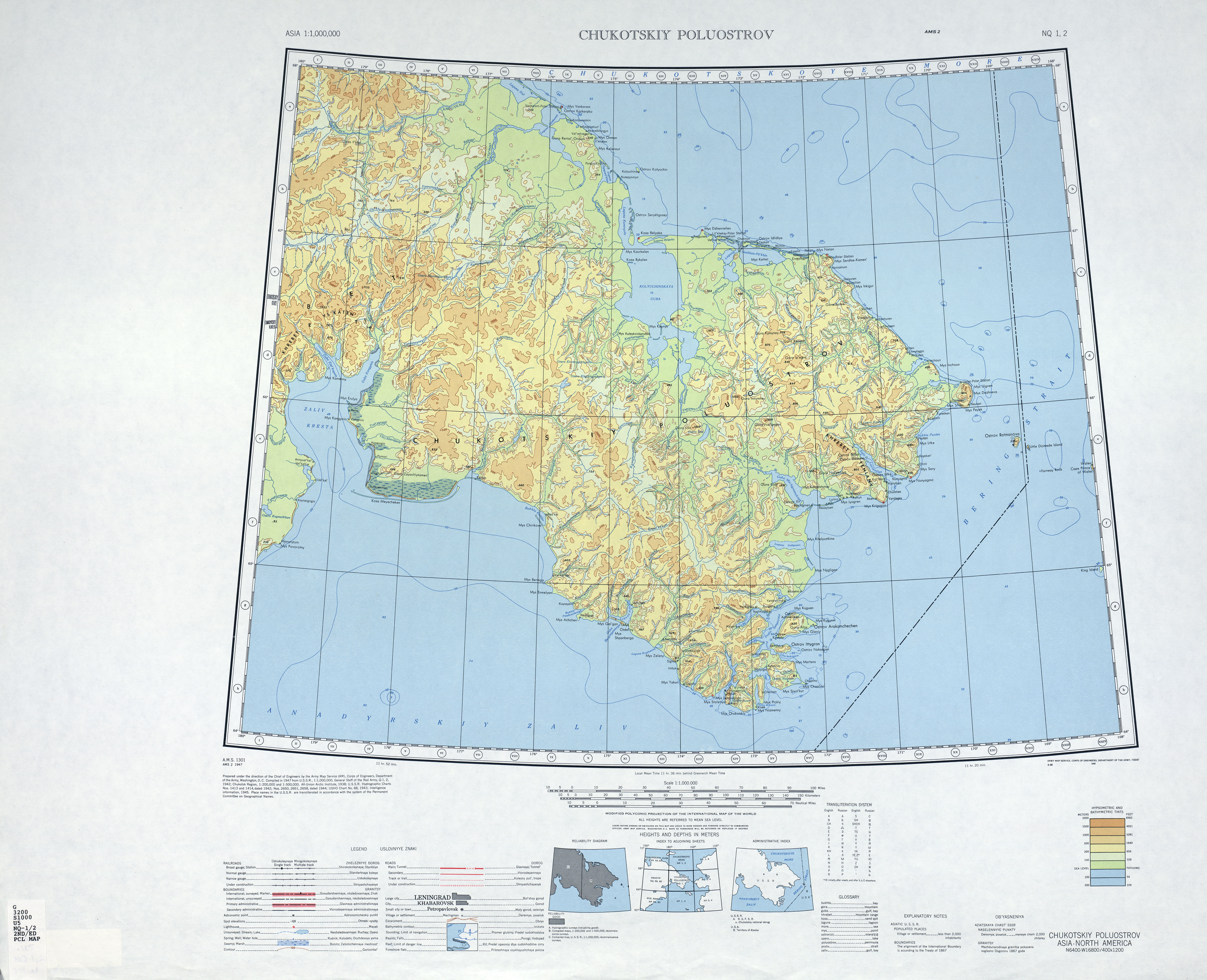
1947 map of the Chukchi Peninsula

== See also ==
- List of islands of Russia
