= 173rd meridian west =

Line of longitude

173rd meridian west

The meridian 173° west of Greenwich is a line of longitude that extends from the North Pole across the Arctic Ocean, Asia, the Pacific Ocean, the Southern Ocean, and Antarctica to the South Pole.

The 173rd meridian west forms a great circle with the 7th meridian east.

== From Pole to Pole ==
Starting at the North Pole and heading south to the South Pole, the 173rd meridian west passes through:

Co-ordinates	Country, territory or sea	Notes
90°0′N 173°0′W	Arctic Ocean	
71°48′N 173°0′W	Chukchi Sea	
67°3′N 173°0′W	Russia	Chukotka Autonomous Okrug — Chukchi Peninsula
64°15′N 173°0′W	Bering Sea	
60°34′N 173°0′W	United States	Alaska — St. Matthew Island
60°29′N 173°0′W	Bering Sea	
52°6′N 173°0′W	United States	Alaska — Amlia Island
52°5′N 173°0′W	Pacific Ocean	Passing just west of the island of Savai'i, Samoa (at 13°31′S 172°48′W)
60°0′S 173°0′W	Southern Ocean	
78°28′S 173°0′W	Antarctica	Ross Dependency, claimed by New Zealand

== See also ==
- 172nd meridian west
- 174th meridian west
