= 172nd Brigade =

172nd Brigade may refer to:

- 172. Infanterie-Brigade, 86th Infantry Division (German Empire)
- 172nd (2/1st South Lancashire) Brigade, United Kingdom
- 172nd Infantry Brigade (United States)

== See also ==
- 172nd Regiment (disambiguation)
