= Eturerveyem River =

River in Russia

Coordinates: 66°35′19″N 174°50′25″W

The Eturerveyem (Russian: Этурэрвейэм) is a river located in the Chukotka Peninsula in Far East Siberia, Russia. It is flowing into the Kolyuchin Bay. It roughly 75 kilometres long.
