= Neskynpil'gyn Lagoon =

- Лагуна Нэскэнпильгын (Russian)
- Location within Russia
- Location: Chukotka Peninsula, Russia
- Coordinates: 66.9167°N 172.9167°W
- Type: lagoon
- Max. length: 40 kilometres (25 mi)
- Max. width: 20 kilometres (12 mi)

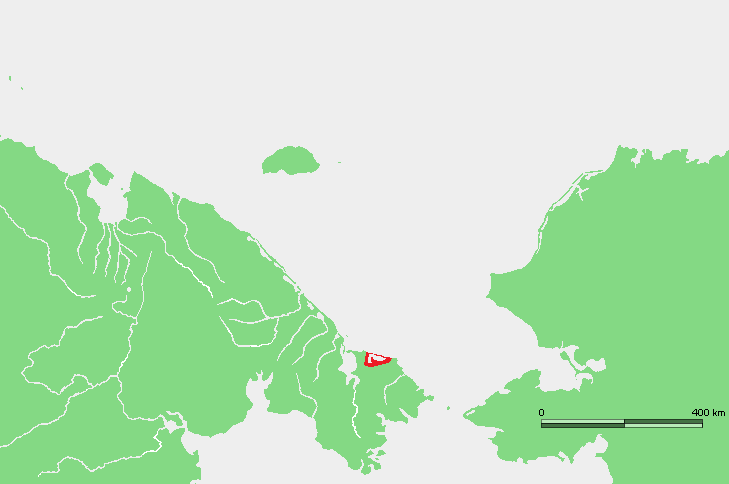
Location of the Neskynpil'gyn Lagoon.

The Neskynpil'gyn Lagoon (Russian: Лагуна Нэскэнпильгын) is a shallow coastal lake in the Chukchi Sea at the northern shore of the Chukotka Peninsula, Russia. 30 kilometres (19 mi) to the east is Kolyuchinskaya Bay and 25 kilometres (16 mi) west, Cape Serdtse-Kamen.

The length of the lagoon is 40 kilometres (25 mi) and its width is about 20 kilometres (12 mi) on average. The Fourhorn sculpin is common in its waters.

The Neskynpil'gyn Lagoon is separated from the sea by a narrow landspit which completely encloses the lagoon, isolating it from the Chukchi Sea, except for a narrow pass. 2 kilometres (1.2 mi) north of the spit is Idlidlya Island. The Chukchi village of Neshkan is located in the spit itself, on the eastern side of the pass. Administratively the whole area around the lagoon belongs to the Chukotka Autonomous Okrug of the Russian Federation.
