= Ioniveyem =

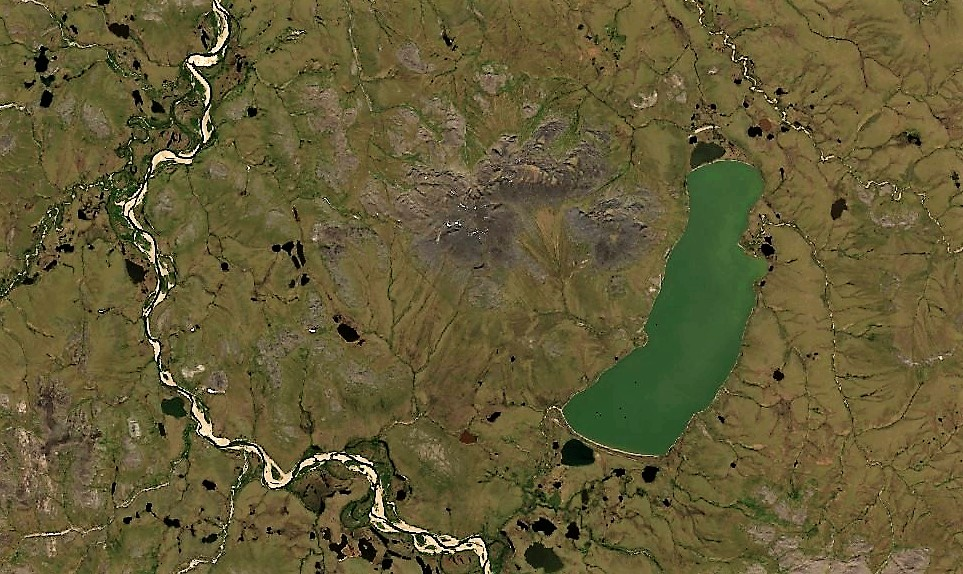
- Ioniveyem and Ioni lake Sentinel-2 image

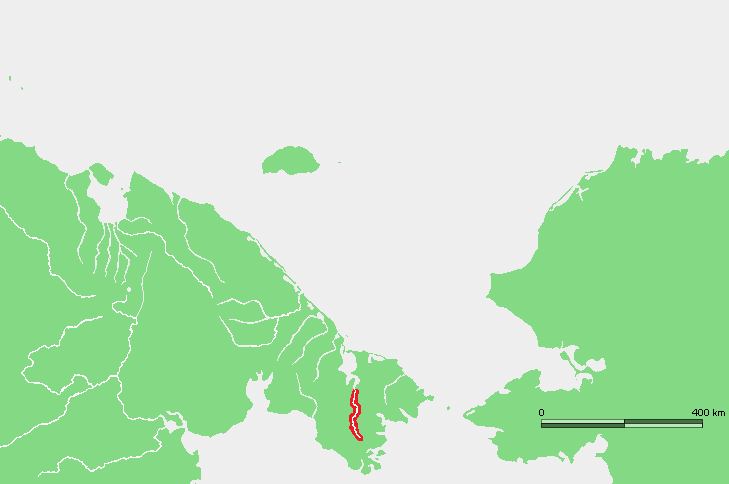
- Location of the Ioniveyem course

Location
- Country: Russia

Physical characteristics
- Mouth: Chukchi Sea
  - coordinates: 66.2575°N 173.9534°W
- Length: 185 km (115 mi)
- Basin size: 4,890 km^{2} (1,890 sq mi)

The Ioniveyem (Russian: Ионивеем, also Ионивээм Ioniveem, Yeni-Veyem and Yoniveem) is a river located in the Chukotka Peninsula in Far East Siberia, Russia. It flows northwards into the Kolyuchinskaya Bay, Chukchi Sea. It is 185 kilometres (115 mi) long, and has a drainage basin of 4,890 square kilometres (1,890 sq mi).

Mount Ioni and Ioni lake are located close to it to the east in mid course.

This river and its basin belong to the Chukotka Autonomous Okrug administrative region of Russia.
