= Idlidlya Island =

Island

Coordinates: 67°03′11″N 172°46′38″W

Idlidlya
Russian: Ostrov Idlidlya
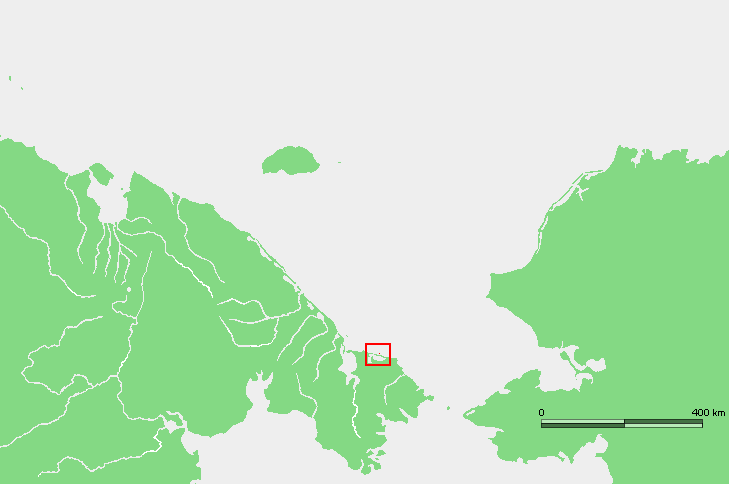
- Location of Idlidlya Island off the landspit enclosing Neskynpil'gyn Lagoon.

Geography
- Length: 1 km (0.6 mi)

Administration
- Russia

Idlidlya Island (Ostrov Idlidlya) is a small island in the Chukchi Sea. It is close to the coast, being only 2 km (1.2 mi) away from the shores of the Chukotka Peninsula in the area of the coastal landspits enclosing Neskynpil'gyn Lagoon.

This island is only 1 km (0.62 mi) in length. There is a small Chukchi village called Neshkan on the coast close to the island.

The importance of this small island lies in the fact that many environmental observations, like monitoring of species, are taken from it.

== History ==
In October 2004 there was a severe oil spill and about 700 birds with oil-damaged plumage were found by hunters in the Chukotka shores. The environmental disaster affected the whole coast between the Neshkan peninsula and Idlidlya island.

== See also ==
- List of islands of Russia
