= 11th meridian =

11th meridian may refer to:

- 11th meridian east, a line of longitude east of the Greenwich Meridian
- 11th meridian west, a line of longitude west of the Greenwich Meridian
