= 170th meridian west =

Line of longitude

170th meridian west

The meridian 170° west of Greenwich is a line of longitude that extends from the North Pole across the Arctic Ocean, Asia, the Pacific Ocean, the Southern Ocean, and Antarctica to the South Pole.

The 170th meridian west forms a great ellipse with the 10th meridian east.

== From Pole to Pole ==
Starting at the North Pole and heading south to the South Pole, the 170th meridian west passes through:

Co-ordinates	Country, territory or sea	Notes
90°0′N 170°0′W	Arctic Ocean	
71°50′N 170°0′W	Chukchi Sea	
66°33′N 170°0′W	Bering Sea	
66°11′N 170°0′W	Russia	Chukotka Autonomous Okrug — Chukchi Peninsula
66°2′N 170°0′W	Bering Sea	
63°28′N 170°0′W	United States	Alaska — St. Lawrence Island
63°9′N 170°0′W	Bering Sea	Passing just east of St. Paul Island, Alaska, United States (at 57°14′N 170°5′W); Passing just west of St. George Island, Alaska, United States (at 56°36′N 169°46′W)
52°54′N 170°0′W	United States	Alaska — Carlisle Island and Chuginadak Island
52°48′N 170°0′W	Pacific Ocean	Passing just west of Niue (at 19°4′S 169°57′W)
60°0′S 170°0′W	Southern Ocean	
78°29′S 170°0′W	Antarctica	Ross Dependency, claimed by New Zealand

== See also ==
- 169th meridian west
- 171st meridian west
