= 169th =

169th is the ordinal form of the number 169. 169th or One hundred and sixty-ninth may also refer to:

- A fraction, 1/169, equal to one of 169 equal parts

== Geography ==
- 169th meridian east, a line of longitude
- 169th meridian west, a line of longitude

== Military ==
- 169th Brigade (disambiguation)
- 169th Division
- 169th Regiment (disambiguation)

== See also ==
- June 18, 169th day of the year in a standard year
