= 5th meridian east =

Line of longitude

5th meridian east (interactive map)

The meridian 5° east of Greenwich is a line of longitude that extends from the North Pole across the Arctic Ocean, Europe, Africa, the Atlantic Ocean, the Southern Ocean, and Antarctica to the South Pole.

The 5th meridian east forms a great circle with the 175th meridian west.

== From Pole to Pole ==
Starting at the North Pole and heading south to the South Pole, the 5th meridian east passes through:

Co-ordinates	Country, territory or sea	Notes
90°0′N 5°0′E	Arctic Ocean	
81°22′N 5°0′E	Atlantic Ocean	
61°2′N 5°0′E	Norway	Several islands, including Bremangerlandet, Sula and Sotra, and the mainland. Entering at Vågsøya in Sogn og Fjordane. Exiting south of Telavåg in Hordaland.
60°13′N 5°0′E	North Sea	
53°17′N 5°0′E	Netherlands	Island of Vlieland
53°16′N 5°0′E	Wadden Sea	
52°56′N 5°0′E	Netherlands	Passing just east of Amsterdam, and west of Tilburg
51°26′N 5°0′E	Belgium	Passing through the Provinces of Antwerp, Limburg, Flemish Brabant, Walloon Brabant, Liège, Namur and Luxembourg.
49°47′N 5°0′E	France	Passing just west of Dijon (at 47°19′N 5°2′E)
43°23′N 5°0′E	Mediterranean Sea	
36°49′N 5°0′E	Algeria	
19°17′N 5°0′E	Niger	
13°44′N 5°0′E	Nigeria	
5°50′N 5°0′E	Atlantic Ocean	
60°0′S 5°0′E	Southern Ocean	
70°3′S 5°0′E	Antarctica	Queen Maud Land, claimed by Norway

== See also ==
- 4th meridian east
- 6th meridian east
