= Irish grid reference system =

System of geographic grid references used for mapping in Ireland

Irish grid

The Irish grid reference system is a system of geographic grid references used for paper mapping in Ireland (both Northern Ireland and the Republic of Ireland). Any location in Ireland can be described in terms of its distance from the origin (0, 0), which lies off the southwest coast. The Irish grid partially overlaps the British grid, and uses a similar co-ordinate system but with a meridian more suited to its westerly location.

== Usage ==
In general, neither Ireland nor Great Britain uses latitude or longitude in describing internal geographic locations. Instead grid reference systems are used for mapping.

The national grid referencing system was devised by the Ordnance Survey, and is heavily used in their survey data, and in maps (whether published by the Ordnance Survey of Ireland, the Ordnance Survey of Northern Ireland or commercial map producers) based on those surveys. Additionally grid references are commonly quoted in other publications and data sources, such as guide books or government planning documents.

== 2001 recasting: the ITM grid ==
In 2001, the Ordnance Survey of Ireland and the Ordnance Survey of Northern Ireland jointly implemented a new coordinate system for Ireland called Irish Transverse Mercator, or ITM, a location-specific optimisation of UTM, which runs in parallel with the existing Irish grid system. In both systems, the true origin is at 53° 30' N, 8° W — a point in Lough Ree, close to the western (Co. Roscommon) shore, whose grid reference is N000500. The ITM system was specified so as to provide precise alignment with modern high-precision global positioning receivers.

== Grid letters ==
The area of Ireland is divided into 25 squares, measuring 100 by 100 km (62 by 62 mi), each identified by a single letter. The squares are numbered A to Z with I being omitted. Seven of the squares do not actually cover any land in Ireland: A, E, K, P, U, Y and Z.

== Eastings and northings ==
Within each square, eastings and northings from the origin (south west corner) of the square are given numerically. For example, G0305 means 'square G, 3 km (1.9 mi) east, 5 km (3.1 mi) north'. A location can be indicated to varying resolutions numerically, usually from two digits in each coordinate (for a 1 km (0.62 mi) square) through to five (for a 1 m (3 ft 3 in)) square; the most common usage is the six figure grid reference, employing three digits in each coordinate to determine a 100 m (330 ft) square.

Coordinates may also be given relative to the origin of the entire 500 by 500 km (310 by 310 mi) grid (in the format easting, northing). For example, the location of the Spire of Dublin on O'Connell Street may be given as 315904, 234671 as well as O1590434671. Coordinates in this format must never be truncated, because, for example, 31590, 23467 is also a valid location.

== Summary parameters of the Irish Grid coordinate system ==
Spheroid: Airy modified,
Datum: 1965,
Map projection: Transverse Mercator
Latitude of origin: 53°30'00 N
Longitude of origin: 8°00'00 W
Scale factor: 1.000 035
False easting: 200000 m
False northing: 250000 m
