= SRTM Water Body Data =

Demo map showing high-resolution SWBD coastlines

The SRTM Water Body Data (SWBD) is a geographical dataset (2003) encoding high-resolution worldwide coastline outlines in a vector format, published by NASA and designed for use in geographic information systems and mapping applications. It was created by BAE Systems ADR for the US National Geospatial-Intelligence Agency (NGA) as a complementary product during editing of the digital elevation model database of the Shuttle Radar Topography Mission (SRTM). SWBD data covers the Earth's surface between 56° southern latitude and 60° northern latitude. It is distributed in ESRI shapefile format, divided into 12,229 files, each covering one 1°-by-1° tile of the Earth's surface.

SWBD data is in the public domain and is made available online for free download by NASA.
