= Cape Serdtse-Kamen =

Headland in Chukotka, Russian Federation

Cape Serdtse-Kamen мыс Сердце-Камень
- Cape
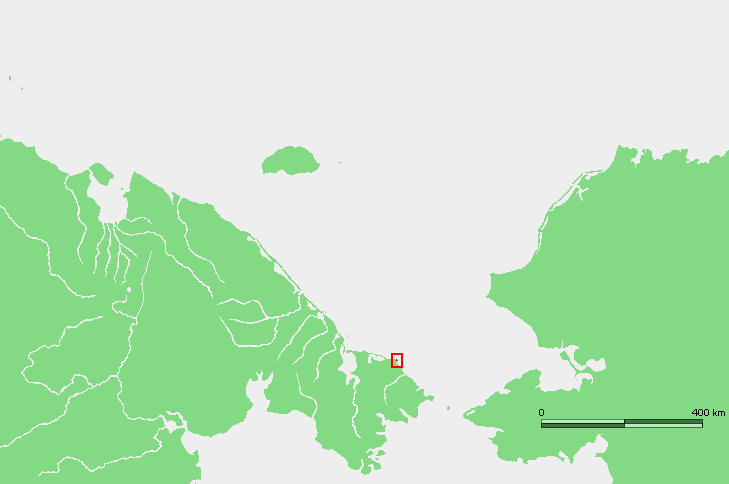
- Location of Cape Serdtse-Kamen.

- Coordinates: 66°54′30″N 171°37′50″W
- Location: Chukotka, Russia
- Offshore water bodies: Chukchi Sea

Area
  - Total: Russian Far East
- Elevation: 440 m (1,440 ft)

Cape Serdtse-Kamen (Russian: мыс Сердце-Камень, literally translated as "Cape Heart-Stone") is a headland on the northeastern coast of Chukotka, Russian Federation. It is about 140 km west of Cape Dezhnev, 120 km east of Kolyuchinskaya Bay and about 30 km to the east of the Neskynpil'gyn Lagoon. Nearby is the village of Enurmino.

Cape Serdtse-Kamen is a geographic landmark, east of which the Chukchi Sea coast slants sharply to the southeast until the Bering Strait.

== History ==
The wreck of the Soviet steamer Chelyuskin, which sank in 1934 during its pioneer exploration of the Northern Sea Route, was discovered in 2006 on the seabed at the depth of about 50 m not far from the cape. The village of Uelen, the easternmost settlement in Russia, is located 150 km to the southeast of Cape Serdtse-Kamen along the coastline.

== Ecology ==
The area around this headland is a natural habitat for the short-tailed albatross (Phoebastria albatrus). Bowhead whales are frequently sighted in the waters off the Serdtse-Kamen Cape. Very large numbers of walruses have been observed resting on shore and in the shallow waters adjacent to this cape during the late autumn.
