= Neshkan, Russia =

Neshkan Нешкан Насӄаӄ (Yupik)
- Selo
- Interactive map of Neshkan
- Location of Neshkan Neshkan (Chukotka Autonomous Okrug)
- Coordinates: 67°03′N 173°01′W
- Country: Russia
- Federal subject: Chukotka Autonomous Okrug
- Administrative district: Chukotsky District
- Founded: Mid 1950s

Population (2010 Census)
  - Total: 704
  - Estimate (January 2018): 609 (−13.5%)

Municipal status
  - Municipal district: Chukotsky Municipal District
  - Rural settlement: Neshkan Rural Settlement
  - Capital of: Neshkan Rural Settlement
- Time zone: UTC+12 (MSK+9)
- Postal code: 689330
- Dialing code: +7 42736
- OKTMO ID: 77633430101

Neshkan (Russian: Нешка́н; Chukchi: Ӈэсӄэн, Ňèsḳèn; Naskuk (Насӄаӄ) in the Yupik language, meaning head of a ringed seal after a nearby hill) is a rural locality (a selo) in Chukotsky District of Chukotka Autonomous Okrug, Russia. It is located on the shores of the Chukchi Sea on a sandy spit that divides Neskynpil'gyn Lagoon from the sea, close to Idlidlya Island. Population: 704 (2010 census); Municipally, Neshkan is subordinated to Chukotsky Municipal District and incorporated as Neshkan Rural Settlement.

== History ==
Like many other villages in Chukotka, Neshkan was founded as a result of Soviet economics. In the 1950s, attempts to unify the itinerant reindeer herders of the area, consisting of the Nuteikvyn, Anayan, Tolgunen, and Vylkarney amongst others into a collective farm led to the creation of the village. The village took its name from the Chukchi word Naskuk, meaning "Seal's Head", so called because one of the mountains surrounding the village looks like a seal's head when viewed from the sea.

Neshkan has seen some benefit in recent years from the money that has been generated by the exploitation of the oil and gas present in the area, as a number of multi-story houses were built in the village in 2005.

The Vega Expedition, the first Arctic expedition to navigate through the Northeast Passage, had to winter from September 1878 to July 1879 in a point (67º 4' 49" North, 173º 23' 2" West) near Neshkan.

== Economy ==
Unlike such villages as Tavayvaam, which have suffered serious economic hardships since the dissolution of the Soviet Union, when all the reindeer owned by the villagers were lost, leading to continuing high unemployment in the area, Neshkan's economy is still dominated by reindeer herding, with there being six separate herds maintained by the villagers, though this is also supplemented by fishing.

However, the village still endures considerable economic isolation as a result of its geography. Only pensioners are paid in cash, while almost all other transactions are barter or coupons (which are often paid to state employees in the region in lieu of cash). What cash is available is spent on necessary supplies, which, due to the isolation of the village and the resulting difficulties in transporting food and other supplies, is often nearly double the price found elsewhere in the region.

== Demographics ==
The village is small, with a population of 704 according to the most recent census results, split equally between men and women, and a reduction on an estimated 2009 population of 720 people, itself a slight increase on the estimated 2003 population of 704 inhabitants (662 of them indigenous people).

== Transport ==
Neshkan is 250 km from the district centre Lavrentiya.

=== Air ===
There are weekly flights from Lavrentiya to the village and the only other means of getting there is a four- to five-day off-road journey.

=== Road ===
Like almost all Chukotkan settlements, there is no direct link from the village to any other settlement by permanent road. There is however, a small network of roads within the settlement including:

- Улица 50 лет Великого Октября (Ulitsa 50 Let Velikogo Oktyabrya, lit. 50 Years of October Street)
- Улица Берзиня (Ulitsa Berzinya, lit. Berzin Street)
- Улица Гагарина (Ulitsa Gagarina, lit. Gagarin Street)
- Улица Комсомольская (Ulitsa Komsomolskaya, lit. Komosomol Street)
- Улица Набережная (Ulitsa Naberezhnaya, lit. Quay Street)
- Улица Полярная (Ulitsa Polyarnaya, lit. Polar Street)
- Улица Строителей (Ulitsa Stroiteley, lit. Builder's Street)
- Улица Строительная (Ulitsa Stroitelnaya, lit. Construction Street)
- Улица Тундровая (Ulitsa Tundrovnaya, lit. Tundra Street)
- Улица Центральная (Ulitsa Tsentralnaya, lit. Central Street)

== Climate ==
Neshkan has a Tundra climate (ET) because the warmest month has an average temperature between 0 °C (32 °F) and 10 °C (50 °F).

Climate data for Neshkan
| Month | Jan | Feb | Mar | Apr | May | Jun | Jul | Aug | Sep | Oct | Nov | Dec | Year |
|---|---|---|---|---|---|---|---|---|---|---|---|---|---|
| Record high °C (°F) | 2 (36) | 3.9 (39.0) | 3.8 (38.8) | 21.2 (70.2) | 12.8 (55.0) | 24 (75) | 19.9 (67.8) | 22 (72) | 10.2 (50.4) | 9.6 (49.3) | 8 (46) | 13 (55) | 24 (75) |
| Mean daily maximum °C (°F) | −13.2 (8.2) | −14.7 (5.5) | −15.9 (3.4) | −11 (12) | −2.1 (28.2) | 3.5 (38.3) | 7.2 (45.0) | 6 (43) | 2 (36) | −1.9 (28.6) | −7.8 (18.0) | −12.6 (9.3) | −5 (23) |
| Mean daily minimum °C (°F) | −15.7 (3.7) | −18.5 (−1.3) | −19.3 (−2.7) | −14.6 (5.7) | −4.4 (24.1) | 0.9 (33.6) | 4.3 (39.7) | 3.7 (38.7) | 0.7 (33.3) | −3.5 (25.7) | −9.7 (14.5) | −14.4 (6.1) | −7.5 (18.5) |
| Record low °C (°F) | −41 (−42) | −42 (−44) | −35.5 (−31.9) | −34.2 (−29.6) | −22.3 (−8.1) | −7.7 (18.1) | −4 (25) | −9 (16) | −7.4 (18.7) | −24.3 (−11.7) | −30.8 (−23.4) | −36.2 (−33.2) | −42 (−44) |
| Average rainfall mm (inches) | 0 (0) | 0 (0) | 0 (0) | 0 (0) | 0 (0) | 3 (0.1) | 0 (0) | 3 (0.1) | 3 (0.1) | 3 (0.1) | 3 (0.1) | 0 (0) | 15 (0.6) |
| Average snowy days | 15 | 10 | 10 | 14 | 14 | 4 | 0 | 1 | 6 | 18 | 20 | 13 | 125 |

== Earthquakes ==
Neshkan experienced a number of earthquakes throughout the 20th century, including several quakes during 1928 measuring 7.7 on the Richter Scale and a number measuring between 5 and 6 throughout the second half of the century. At the time that these regular earthquakes began to affect the village, there was a lack of seismic stations in the okrug. In 2002, Bilibino was the site of the only working seismic station in the region and was over 700 km away. Prior to this, there had been a seismic station in Iultin, but this was still over 200 km away and neither was close enough to any epicentre to draw out any trends.

In response to these earthquakes and the growing complaints from the inhabitants of Neshkan, a permanent station was established in the village, which detected over 150 small quakes in little more than eighteen days, leading geophysicists to suggest that the quakes have been caused by a previously unknown fault extending across this part of Chukotka, a view strengthened by the linear pattern of the quakes and the presence of hot springs in places like Lorino.

The local toponymy suggests a more longstanding association between the indigenous people, with many geographical objects having names which conjure images of earthquakes such as the mountains Elyulivoigyn, Ivuichin, and Eletkun, meaning "shivering", "moving", and "dancing" mountain respectively, as well as nearby lake names such as Einekuem, meaning "buzzing lake".

These earthquakes have been attributed to the newly theorised Loloveem Fault, which runs from Cape Neshkan, where the village is situated, in a south-southwesterly direction through Neskynpilgyn Lagoon and Innuloon Lagoon.

== Photo gallery ==
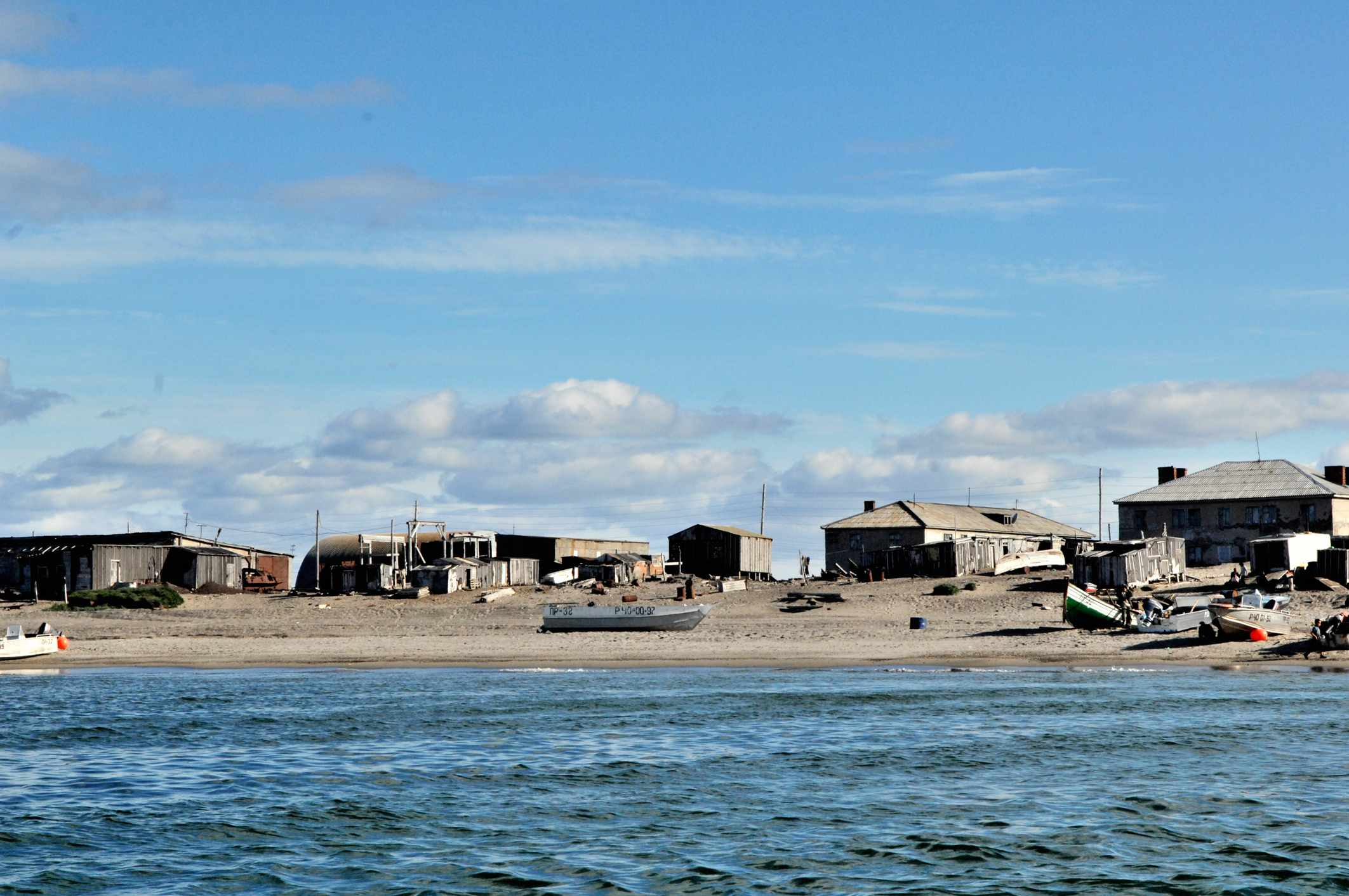
Neshkan (Chukotka, Russia;
67°2‘15’’N, 172°57’50’’W)

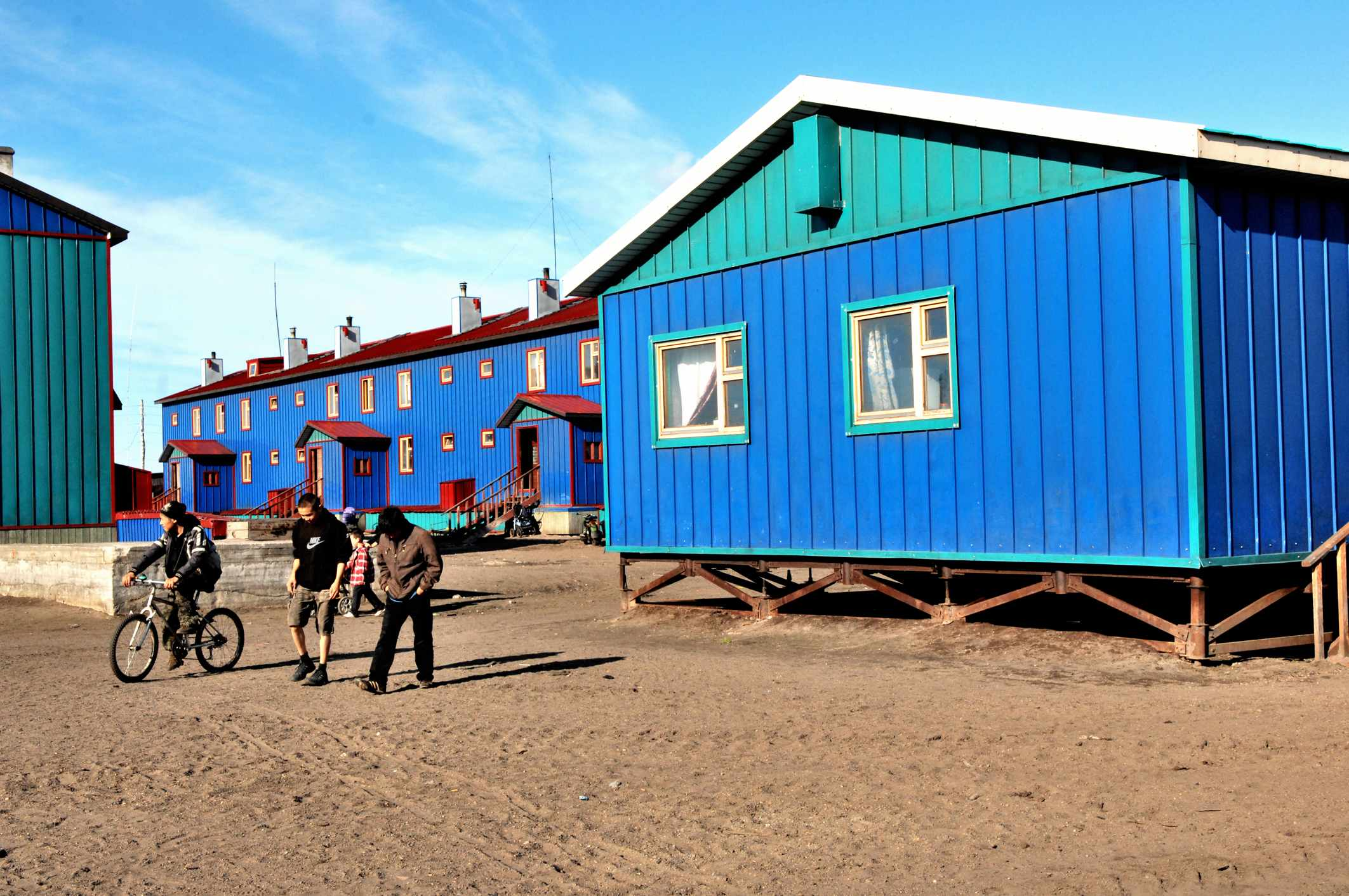
Neshkan, street scene

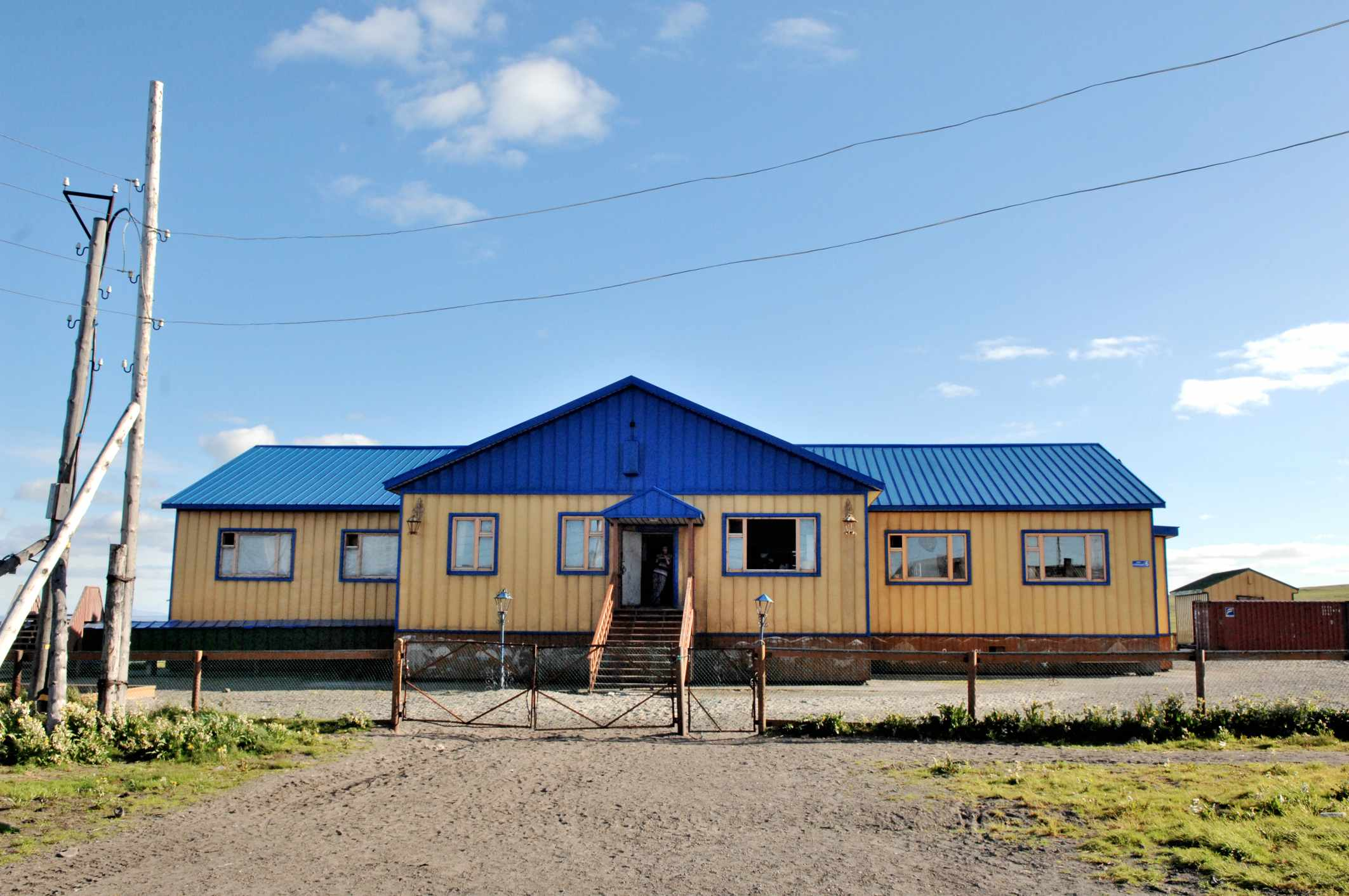
Neshkan, schoolhouse

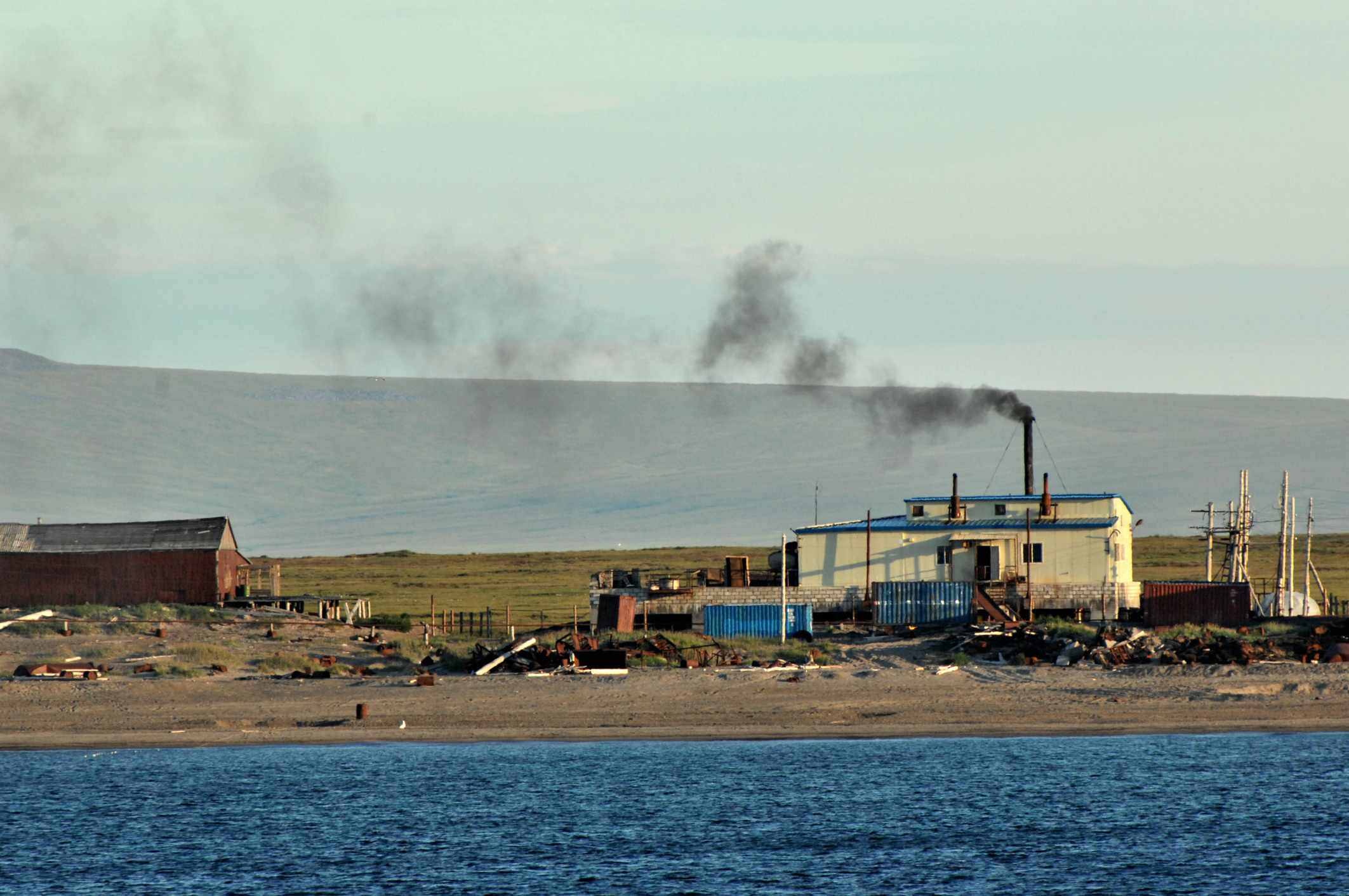
Neshkan, heating plant

== See also ==
- List of inhabited localities in Chukotsky District
