= 9th meridian east =

Line of longitude

9th meridian east (interactive map)

The meridian 9° east of Greenwich is a line of longitude that extends from the North Pole across the Arctic Ocean, Europe, Africa, the Atlantic Ocean, the Southern Ocean, and Antarctica to the South Pole.

The 9th meridian east forms a great circle with the 171st meridian west.

== From Pole to Pole ==
Starting at the North Pole and heading south to the South Pole, the 9th meridian east passes through:

Co-ordinates	Country, territory or sea	Notes
90°0′N 9°0′E	Arctic Ocean	
81°9′N 9°0′E	Atlantic Ocean	
63°39′N 9°0′E	Norway	Entering at Hitra in Trøndelag. Exiting at Tverrdalsøya in Agder.
58°34′N 9°0′E	Skagerrak	
57°9′N 9°0′E	Denmark	North Jutlandic Island
57°1′N 9°0′E	Limfjord	
56°50′N 9°0′E	Denmark	Jutland mainland
54°53′N 9°0′E	Germany	just west of DCF77 time signal transmitter
47°41′N 9°0′E	Switzerland	
45°59′N 9°0′E	Italy	For about 2km
45°58′N 9°0′E	Switzerland	For about 16km
45°50′N 9°0′E	Italy	
44°23′N 9°0′E	Mediterranean Sea	Ligurian Sea
42°39′N 9°0′E	France	Island of Corsica
41°29′N 9°0′E	Mediterranean Sea	Strait of Bonifacio
41°7′N 9°0′E	Italy	Island of Sardinia
39°0′N 9°0′E	Mediterranean Sea	Passing just east of the Galite Islands, Tunisia
37°7′N 9°0′E	Tunisia	
32°8′N 9°0′E	Algeria	
21°47′N 9°0′E	Niger	
12°50′N 9°0′E	Nigeria	
5°57′N 9°0′E	Cameroon	
4°5′N 9°0′E	Atlantic Ocean	Gulf of Guinea - passing just east of the island of Bioko, Equatorial Guinea
0°39′S 9°0′E	Gabon	
1°19′S 9°0′E	Atlantic Ocean	
60°0′S 9°0′E	Southern Ocean	
69°55′S 9°0′E	Antarctica	Queen Maud Land, claimed by Norway

== See also ==
- 8th meridian east
- 10th meridian east
