= 169th meridian east =

Line of longitude

169th meridian east

The meridian 169° east of Greenwich is a line of longitude that extends from the North Pole across the Arctic Ocean, Asia, the Pacific Ocean, New Zealand, the Southern Ocean, and Antarctica to the South Pole.

The 169th meridian east forms a great circle with the 11th meridian west.

== From Pole to Pole ==
Starting at the North Pole and heading south to the South Pole, the 169th meridian east passes through:

Co-ordinates	Country, territory or sea	Notes
90°0′N 169°0′E	Arctic Ocean	
74°10′N 169°0′E	East Siberian Sea	
69°55′N 169°0′E	Russia	Chukotka Autonomous Okrug — Ayon Island
69°33′N 169°0′E	East Siberian Sea	Chaunskaya Bay
69°8′N 169°0′E	Russia	Chukotka Autonomous Okrug; Kamchatka Krai — from 63°58′N 169°0′E; Chukotka Autonomous Okrug — from 63°23′N 169°0′E; Kamchatka Krai — from 62°57′N 169°0′E
60°34′N 169°0′E	Bering Sea	
54°10′N 169°0′E	Pacific Ocean	
14°39′N 169°0′E	Marshall Islands	Bokak Atoll
14°35′N 169°0′E	Pacific Ocean	
10°3′N 169°0′E	Marshall Islands	Likiep Atoll
9°55′N 169°0′E	Pacific Ocean	Passing just east of Ailinglaplap Atoll, Marshall Islands (at 7°35′N 168°58′E); Passing just west of Kili Island, Marshall Islands (at 5°38′N 169°7′E); Passing just east of Ebon Atoll, Marshall Islands (at 4°38′N 168°46′E); Passing just east of the island of Tikopia, Solomon Islands (at 12°18′S 168°51′E)
18°41′S 169°0′E	Vanuatu	Island of Erromango
18°53′S 169°0′E	Pacific Ocean	Passing just west of the island of Tanna, Vanuatu (at 19°27′S 169°13′E); Passing just east of Walpole Island, New Caledonia (at 22°35′S 168°57′E)
43°51′S 169°0′E	New Zealand	South Island — passing through the island's southernmost point, Slope Point
46°40′S 169°0′E	Pacific Ocean	Passing between the Hook Keys and Campbell Island, New Zealand (at 52°33′S 170°0′E)
60°0′S 169°0′E	Southern Ocean	
71°24′S 169°0′E	Antarctica	Ross Dependency, claimed by New Zealand
73°29′S 169°0′E	Southern Ocean	Ross Sea
77°29′S 169°0′E	Antarctica	Ross Dependency, claimed by New Zealand

== See also ==
- 168th meridian east
- 170th meridian east
