= 172nd meridian west =

Line of longitude

172nd meridian west

The meridian 172° west of Greenwich is a line of longitude that extends from the North Pole across the Arctic Ocean, Asia, the Pacific Ocean, the Southern Ocean, and Antarctica to the South Pole.

The 172nd meridian west forms a great circle with the 8th meridian east.

== From Pole to Pole ==
Starting at the North Pole and heading south to the South Pole, the 172nd meridian west passes through:

| Co-ordinates | Country, territory or sea | Notes |
|---|---|---|
| 90°0′N 172°0′W | Arctic Ocean | |
| 71°49′N 172°0′W | Chukchi Sea | |
| 66°57′N 172°0′W | Russia | Chukotka Autonomous Okrug — Chukchi Peninsula |
| 65°28′N 172°0′W | Bering Sea | Passing just east of Arakamchechen Island, Chukotka Autonomous Okrug, Russia (at 64°45′N 172°3′W); Passing just east of Cape Chaplino, Chukotka Autonomous Okrug, Russia (at 64°24′N 172°13′W); Passing just west of St. Lawrence Island, Alaska, United States (at 63°29′N 171°51′W); Passing just east of St. Matthew Island, Alaska, United States (at 60°19′N 172°12′W); Passing just east of Seguam Island, Alaska, United States (at 52°20′N 172°17′W) |
| 52°22′N 172°0′W | Pacific Ocean | Passing just west of the island of Laysan, Hawaii, United States (at 25°46′N 171°43′W); Passing just west of Kanton Island, Kiribati (at 2°46′S 171°43′W); Passing just east of Orona atoll, Kiribati (at 4°30′S 172°8′W); Passing just west of Nukunonu atoll, Tokelau (at 9°7′S 171°52′W); Passing just east of the island of Savai'i, Samoa (at 13°39′S 172°10′W) |
| 13°49′S 172°0′W | Samoa | Island of Upolu |
| 13°55′S 172°0′W | Pacific Ocean | |
| 60°0′S 172°0′W | Southern Ocean | |
| 78°28′S 172°0′W | Antarctica | Ross Dependency, claimed by New Zealand |

== See also ==
- 171st meridian west
- 173rd meridian west
