= 169th Division (People's Republic of China) =

169th Division (1949–50)
- Active: 1949.4 - 1950.8
- Country: People's Republic of China
- Branch: People's Liberation Army
- Type: Division
- Role: Infantry

The 169th Division (Chinese: 第169师) was an infantry division in the People's Liberation Army. It was created in April 1949 under the Regulation of the Redesignations of All Organizations and Units of the Army issued by the Central Military Commission on November 1, 1948. It was based in the 3rd Training and Consolidation Division of Northeastern Military Region.

The division functioned as a second-line unit and never went into battle.

In July 1950, the division was disbanded and reorganized into border troops.

At the time of its disbanding, the 169th Division consisted of the 505th, 506th and 507th Regiments.
