= 10th meridian east =

Line of longitude

10th meridian east

The meridian 10° east of Greenwich is a line of longitude that extends from the North Pole across the Arctic Ocean, Europe, Africa, the Atlantic Ocean, the Southern Ocean, and Antarctica to the South Pole.

The 10th meridian east forms a great circle with the 170th meridian west.

== From pole to pole ==
Starting at the North Pole and heading south to the South Pole, the 10th meridian east passes through:

Co-ordinates	Country, territory or sea	Notes
90°0′N 10°0′E	Arctic Ocean	
81°5′N 10°0′E	Atlantic Ocean	
64°5′N 10°0′E	Norway	Entering at Stokkøya in Sør-Trøndelag. Exiting 3 km southwest of Stavern in Vestfold.
58°58′N 10°0′E	Skagerrak	
57°35′N 10°0′E	Denmark	Vendsyssel-Thy island, Jutland peninsula and the islands of Funen and Als
54°43′N 10°0′E	Germany	Passing through city centre / old city of Hamburg
47°29′N 10°0′E	Austria	
46°54′N 10°0′E	Switzerland	
46°17′N 10°0′E	Italy	
44°3′N 10°0′E	Mediterranean Sea	Passing just east of the island of Capraia, Italy; Passing just west of the islands of Elba and Pianosa, Italy; Passing just east of the island of Sardinia, Italy
37°15′N 10°0′E	Tunisia	
30°28′N 10°0′E	Libya	
25°23′N 10°0′E	Algeria	
22°22′N 10°0′E	Niger	
13°10′N 10°0′E	Nigeria	
6°54′N 10°0′E	Cameroon	
2°10′N 10°0′E	Equatorial Guinea	
1°0′N 10°0′E	Gabon	
2°47′S 10°0′E	Atlantic Ocean	
60°0′S 10°0′E	Southern Ocean	
69°53′S 10°0′E	Antarctica	Queen Maud Land, claimed by Norway

== Usage ==
In some world maps, the 10th Meridian East is used the centre (instead of Greenwich), to avoid cutting off the tip of Asia.

== See also ==
- 9th meridian east
- 11th meridian east
