= 11th meridian west =

Line of longitude

11th meridian west

The meridian 11° west of Greenwich is a line of longitude that extends from the North Pole across the Arctic Ocean, the Atlantic Ocean, Africa, the Southern Ocean, and Antarctica to the South Pole.

The 11th meridian west forms a great circle with the 169th meridian east.

== From Pole to Pole ==
Starting at the North Pole and heading south to the South Pole, the 11th meridian west passes through:

Co-ordinates	Country, territory or sea	Notes
90°0′N 11°0′W	Arctic Ocean	
82°15′N 11°0′W	Atlantic Ocean	Passing just east of Nordostrundingen, Greenland
28°47′N 11°0′W	Morocco	
27°40′N 11°0′W	Western Sahara	Claimed by Morocco
26°0′N 11°0′W	Mauritania	
15°14′N 11°0′W	Mali	
12°12′N 11°0′W	Guinea	
9°45′N 11°0′W	Sierra Leone	
7°27′N 11°0′W	Liberia	
6°33′N 11°0′W	Atlantic Ocean	
60°0′S 11°0′W	Southern Ocean	
71°1′S 11°0′W	Antarctica	Queen Maud Land, claimed by Norway

== See also ==
- 10th meridian west
- 12th meridian west
