= 6th meridian east =

Line of longitude

6th meridian east (interactive map)

The meridian 6° east of Greenwich is a line of longitude that extends from the North Pole across the Arctic Ocean, Europe, Africa, the Atlantic Ocean, the Southern Ocean, and Antarctica to the South Pole.

The 6th meridian east forms a great ellipse with the 174th meridian west.

== From Pole to Pole ==
Starting at the North Pole and heading south to the South Pole, the 6th meridian east passes through:

Co-ordinates	Country, territory or sea	Notes
90°0′N 6°0′E	Arctic Ocean	
81°19′N 6°0′E	Atlantic Ocean	
62°29′N 6°0′E	Norway	Entering at Godøya in Møre og Romsdal. Exiting south of Eigersund in Rogaland.
58°25′N 6°0′E	North Sea	
53°24′N 6°0′E	Netherlands	Passing just east of Apeldoorn and Arnhem
51°50′N 6°0′E	Germany	For about 10 km
51°44′N 6°0′E	Netherlands	
51°5′N 6°0′E	Germany	For about 11 km
50°59′N 6°0′E	Netherlands	
50°48′N 6°0′E	Germany	For about 2 km, passing just west of Aachen
50°47′N 6°0′E	Netherlands	For about 4 km
50°45′N 6°0′E	Belgium	
50°11′N 6°0′E	Luxembourg	Passing just west of the city of Luxembourg
49°27′N 6°0′E	France	Passing through Besançon
46°14′N 6°0′E	Switzerland	For about 9 km, just west of Geneva
46°9′N 6°0′E	France	Meeting the Mediterranean Sea just east of Toulon
43°6′N 6°0′E	Mediterranean Sea	
36°51′N 6°0′E	Algeria	
19°36′N 6°0′E	Niger	
13°42′N 6°0′E	Nigeria	
4°19′N 6°0′E	Atlantic Ocean	Passing just west of the island of São Tomé, São Tomé and Príncipe; Passing just east of the island of Annobón, Equatorial Guinea
60°0′S 6°0′E	Southern Ocean	
70°1′S 6°0′E	Antarctica	Queen Maud Land, claimed by Norway

== See also ==
- 5th meridian east
- 7th meridian east
