= 10th meridian west =

Line of longitude

10th meridian west

The meridian 10° west of Greenwich is a line of longitude that extends from the North Pole across the Arctic Ocean, the Atlantic Ocean, Ireland, Africa, the Southern Ocean, and Antarctica to the South Pole.

The 10th meridian west forms a great circle with the 170th meridian east.

This longitude is the eastern limit of the Atlântico Brasileiro, Montevideo, Ezeiza and Comodoro Rivadavia flight information regions, as well as the western limit of the Luanda and Johannesburg Oceanic FIRs.

The meridian defines the western limit of the New Swabia area in Queen Maud Land, Antarctica.

== From Pole to Pole ==
Starting at the North Pole and heading south to the South Pole, the 10th meridian west passes through:

Co-ordinates	Country, territory or sea	Notes
90°0′N 10°0′W	Arctic Ocean	
82°12′N 10°0′W	Atlantic Ocean	
54°19′N 10°0′W	Ireland	Mullet Peninsula, Achill Island, Clare Island and Connemara
53°23′N 10°0′W	Atlantic Ocean	
52°15′N 10°0′W	Ireland	Dingle, Iveragh and Beara Peninsulas
51°37′N 10°0′W	Atlantic Ocean	
29°39′N 10°0′W	Morocco	
27°40′N 10°0′W	Western Sahara	Claimed by Morocco
26°0′N 10°0′W	Mauritania	
15°21′N 10°0′W	Mali	
12°7′N 10°0′W	Guinea	
8°26′N 10°0′W	Liberia	
5°49′N 10°0′W	Atlantic Ocean	
40°18′S 10°0′W	Saint Helena, Ascension and Tristan da Cunha	Gough Island
40°19′S 10°0′W	Atlantic Ocean	
60°0′S 10°0′W	Southern Ocean	
70°50′S 10°0′W	Antarctica	Queen Maud Land, claimed by Norway

== See also ==
- 9th meridian west
- 11th meridian west
