= 8th meridian west =

Line of longitude

8th meridian west

The meridian 8° west of Greenwich is a line of longitude that extends from the North Pole across the Arctic Ocean, the Atlantic Ocean, Europe, Africa, the Southern Ocean, and Antarctica to the South Pole.

The 8th meridian west forms a great circle with the 172nd meridian east.

== From Pole to Pole ==
Starting at the North Pole and heading south to the South Pole, the 8th meridian west passes through:

Co-ordinates	Country, territory or sea	Notes
90°0′N 8°0′W	Arctic Ocean	
82°5′N 8°0′W	Atlantic Ocean	
71°9′N 8°0′W	Norway	Island of Jan Mayen
71°1′N 8°0′W	Atlantic Ocean	Passing just west of the island of Mykines, Faroe Islands (at 62°6′N 7°40′W); Passing just west of the Monach Islands, Scotland, United Kingdom (at 57°31′N 7°40′W); Passing just west of the island of Mingulay, Scotland, United Kingdom (at 56°48′N 7°40′W)
55°13′N 8°0′W	Ireland	
54°32′N 8°0′W	United Kingdom	Northern Ireland
54°21′N 8°0′W	Ireland	Passing just west of Athlone (at 53°25′N 7°56′W)
51°51′N 8°0′W	Atlantic Ocean	
43°42′N 8°0′W	Spain	Cedeira (province of A Coruña)
41°50′N 8°0′W	Portugal	Montalegre (Vila Real District)
37°0′N 8°0′W	Atlantic Ocean	
33°28′N 8°0′W	Morocco	Passing through Marrakesh (at 31°38′N 8°0′W)
29°7′N 8°0′W	Algeria	
26°55′N 8°0′W	Mauritania	
15°30′N 8°0′W	Mali	Passing through Bamako (at 12°38′N 8°0′W)
10°20′N 8°0′W	Guinea	
10°8′N 8°0′W	Ivory Coast	
9°24′N 8°0′W	Guinea	
8°29′N 8°0′W	Ivory Coast	
8°12′N 8°0′W	Guinea	For about 3 km
8°10′N 8°0′W	Ivory Coast	For about 9 km
8°5′N 8°0′W	Guinea	For about 6 km
8°2′N 8°0′W	Ivory Coast	
6°19′N 8°0′W	Liberia	
4°31′N 8°0′W	Atlantic Ocean	
60°0′S 8°0′W	Southern Ocean	
70°40′S 8°0′W	Antarctica	Queen Maud Land, claimed by Norway

== Ordnance Survey Ireland ==
The Irish grid reference system uses the point 53°30′N 8°0′W as its true origin.

== See also ==
- 7th meridian west
- 9th meridian west
