= 8th meridian east =

Line of longitude

8th meridian east

The meridian 8° east of Greenwich is a line of longitude that extends from the North Pole across the Arctic Ocean, Europe, Africa, the Atlantic Ocean, the Southern Ocean, and Antarctica to the South Pole.

The 8th meridian east forms a great circle with the 172nd meridian west.

== From Pole to Pole ==
Starting at the North Pole and heading south to the South Pole, the 8th meridian east passes through:

Co-ordinates	Country, territory or sea	Notes
90°0′N 8°0′E	Arctic Ocean	
81°12′N 8°0′E	Atlantic Ocean	
63°28′N 8°0′E	Norway	Islands of Smøla and Tustna, the mainland (passing through Kristiansand), and the island of Flekkerøy.
58°3′N 8°0′E	North Sea	Passing just west of Jutland, Denmark; Passing just east of the island of Heligoland, Germany
53°43′N 8°0′E	Germany	
49°2′N 8°0′E	France	
48°46′N 8°0′E	Germany	
47°34′N 8°0′E	Switzerland	
46°1′N 8°0′E	Italy	
43°52′N 8°0′E	Mediterranean Sea	Passing just west of the islands of Sardinia and San Pietro, Italy
36°52′N 8°0′E	Algeria	
34°28′N 8°0′E	Tunisia	
33°7′N 8°0′E	Algeria	
21°11′N 8°0′E	Niger	
13°19′N 8°0′E	Nigeria	
4°32′N 8°0′E	Atlantic Ocean	Passing just west of the island of Bioko, Equatorial Guinea
60°0′S 8°0′E	Southern Ocean	
69°53′S 8°0′E	Antarctica	Queen Maud Land, claimed by Norway

== See also ==
- 7th meridian east
- 9th meridian east
