= 171st meridian west =

Line of longitude

171st meridian west

The meridian 171° west of Greenwich is a line of longitude that extends from the North Pole across the Arctic Ocean, Asia, the Pacific Ocean, the Southern Ocean, and Antarctica to the South Pole.

The 171st meridian west forms a great circle with the 9th meridian east.

== From Pole to Pole ==
Starting at the North Pole and heading south to the South Pole, the 171st meridian west passes through:

Co-ordinates	Country, territory or sea	Notes
90°0′N 171°0′W	Arctic Ocean	
71°50′N 171°0′W	Chukchi Sea	
66°32′N 171°0′W	Russia	Chukotka Autonomous Okrug — Chukchi Peninsula
65°29′N 171°0′W	Bering Sea	
63°35′N 171°0′W	United States	Alaska — St. Lawrence Island
63°25′N 171°0′W	Bering Sea	Passing just east of Chagulak Island, Alaska, United States (at 52°34′N 171°6′W); Passing just west of Yunaska Island, Alaska, United States (at 52°33′N 170°51′W)
52°32′N 171°0′W	Pacific Ocean	Passing just east of Enderbury Island, Kiribati (at 3°8′S 171°4′W); Passing just west of Rawaki Island, Kiribati (at 3°43′S 170°43′W); Passing just east of Manra Island, Kiribati (at 4°27′S 171°13′W); Passing just east of Fakaofo atoll, Tokelau (at 9°21′S 171°11′W); Passing just east of Swains Island, American Samoa (claimed by Tokelau) (at 11°3′S 171°3′W); Passing just west of the island of Tutuila, American Samoa (at 14°19′S 170°51′W)
60°0′S 171°0′W	Southern Ocean	
78°29′S 171°0′W	Antarctica	Ross Dependency, claimed by New Zealand

== See also ==
- 170th meridian west
- 172nd meridian west
