= 9th meridian west =

Line of longitude

9th meridian west

The meridian 9° west of Greenwich is a line of longitude that extends from the North Pole across the Arctic Ocean, the Atlantic Ocean, Europe, Africa, the Southern Ocean, and Antarctica to the South Pole.

The 9th meridian west forms a great circle with the 171st meridian east.

== From Pole to Pole ==
Starting at the North Pole and heading south to the South Pole, the 9th meridian west passes through:

Co-ordinates	Country, territory or sea	Notes
90°0′N 9°0′W	Arctic Ocean	
82°8′N 9°0′W	Atlantic Ocean	
70°52′N 9°0′W	Norway	Island of Jan Mayen
70°49′N 9°0′W	Atlantic Ocean	
54°18′N 9°0′W	Ireland	Passing just east of Galway at 53°16'48"N
51°34′N 9°0′W	Atlantic Ocean	
43°14′N 9°0′W	Spain	Mainland and island of Sálvora
42°28′N 9°0′W	Atlantic Ocean	
39°48′N 9°0′W	Portugal	Passing just east of Lisbon (at 38°42′N 9°8′W)
38°27′N 9°0′W	Atlantic Ocean	Passing just west of Cape St. Vincent, Portugal (at 37°1′N 8°59′W)
32°47′N 9°0′W	Morocco	
27°40′N 9°0′W	Western Sahara	Claimed by Morocco
26°0′N 9°0′W	Mauritania	
15°30′N 9°0′W	Mali	
12°22′N 9°0′W	Guinea	
7°14′N 9°0′W	Liberia	
4°58′N 9°0′W	Atlantic Ocean	
60°0′S 9°0′W	Southern Ocean	
70°27′S 9°0′W	Antarctica	Queen Maud Land, claimed by Norway

== See also ==
- 8th meridian west
- 10th meridian west
