= 170th meridian east =

Line of longitude

170th meridian east

The meridian 170° east of Greenwich is a line of longitude that extends from the North Pole across the Arctic Ocean, Asia, the Pacific Ocean, New Zealand, the Southern Ocean, and Antarctica to the South Pole.

The 170th meridian east forms a great ellipse with the 10th meridian west.

== From Pole to Pole ==
Starting at the North Pole and heading south to the South Pole, the 170th meridian east passes through:

Co-ordinates	Country, territory or sea	Notes
90°0′N 170°0′E	Arctic Ocean	
73°56′N 170°0′E	East Siberian Sea	
68°47′N 170°0′E	Russia	Anadyr Highlands, Chukotka Autonomous Okrug; Kamchatka Krai — from 62°40′N 170°0′E
60°4′N 170°0′E	Bering Sea	
53°50′N 170°0′E	Pacific Ocean	Passing just west of Bikar Atoll, Marshall Islands (at 12°14′N 170°4′E); Passing just east of Utirik Atoll, Marshall Islands (at 11°14′N 169°52′E); Passing just east of Ailuk Atoll, Marshall Islands (at 10°14′N 169°59′E)
9°31′N 170°0′E	Marshall Islands	Wotje Atoll and Erikub Atoll
9°4′N 170°0′E	Pacific Ocean	Passing just east of Anuta island, Solomon Islands (at 11°36′S 169°51′E); Passing just west of Futuna island, Vanuatu (at 19°31′S 170°12′E); Passing just east of Anatom island, Vanuatu (at 20°12′S 169°54′E)
43°20′S 170°0′E	New Zealand	South Island
46°15′S 170°0′E	Pacific Ocean	Passing just east of Campbell Island, New Zealand (at 52°33′S 169°16′E)
60°0′S 170°0′E	Southern Ocean	
71°38′S 170°0′E	Antarctica	Ross Dependency, claimed by New Zealand
72°43′S 170°0′E	Southern Ocean	Ross Sea — passing just east of Coulman Island (at 73°32′S 169°55′E)
77°21′S 170°0′E	Antarctica	Ross Dependency, claimed by New Zealand

== See also ==
- 169th meridian east
- 171st meridian east
