= 7th meridian east =

Line of longitude

7th meridian east (interactive map)

The meridian 7° east of Greenwich is a line of longitude that extends from the North Pole across the Arctic Ocean, Europe, Africa, the Atlantic Ocean, the Southern Ocean, and Antarctica to the South Pole.

The 7th meridian east forms a great circle with the 173rd meridian west.

== From Pole to Pole ==
Starting at the North Pole, and heading south to the South Pole, the 7th meridian east passes through:

| Co-ordinates | Country, territory or sea | Notes |
|---|---|---|
| 90°0′N 7°0′E | Arctic Ocean | |
| 81°15′N 7°0′E | Atlantic Ocean | |
| 62°57′N 7°0′E | Norway | Entering at Hustadvika Municipality in Møre og Romsdal. Exiting 3 km west of Lindesnes Lighthouse in Agder. |
| 58°1′N 7°0′E | North Sea | |
| 53°41′N 7°0′E | Germany | Island of Juist |
| 53°40′N 7°0′E | Wadden Sea | |
| 53°19′N 7°0′E | Netherlands | |
| 52°38′N 7°0′E | Germany | |
| 52°28′N 7°0′E | Netherlands | |
| 52°14′N 7°0′E | Germany | Passing just east of Leverkusen (at 51°02′N 6°59′E); Passing through Saarbrücken (at 49°14′N 7°0′E) |
| 49°11′N 7°0′E | France | |
| 47°30′N 7°0′E | Switzerland | For about 14 km |
| 47°22′N 7°0′E | France | For about 8 km |
| 47°18′N 7°0′E | Switzerland | |
| 46°1′N 7°0′E | France | For about 14 km |
| 45°53′N 7°0′E | Italy | |
| 45°32′N 7°0′E | France | |
| 45°13′N 7°0′E | Italy | |
| 44°15′N 7°0′E | France | |
| 44°42′N 7°0′E | Italy | |
| 44°15′N 7°0′E | France | Passing just west of Cannes (at 43°33′N 7°1′E) |
| 43°33′N 7°0′E | Mediterranean Sea | |
| 36°54′N 7°0′E | Algeria | |
| 20°29′N 7°0′E | Niger | |
| 12°59′N 7°0′E | Nigeria | Passing just west of Port Harcourt (at 4°49′N 7°2′E) |
| 4°23′N 7°0′E | Atlantic Ocean | Passing just west of the island of Príncipe, São Tomé and Príncipe; Passing just east of the island of São Tomé, São Tomé and Príncipe |
| 60°0′S 7°0′E | Southern Ocean | |
| 69°53′S 7°0′E | Antarctica | Queen Maud Land, claimed by Norway |

== See also ==
- 6th meridian east
- 8th meridian east
