= Koniuji Island =

Island in the U.S. state of Alaska

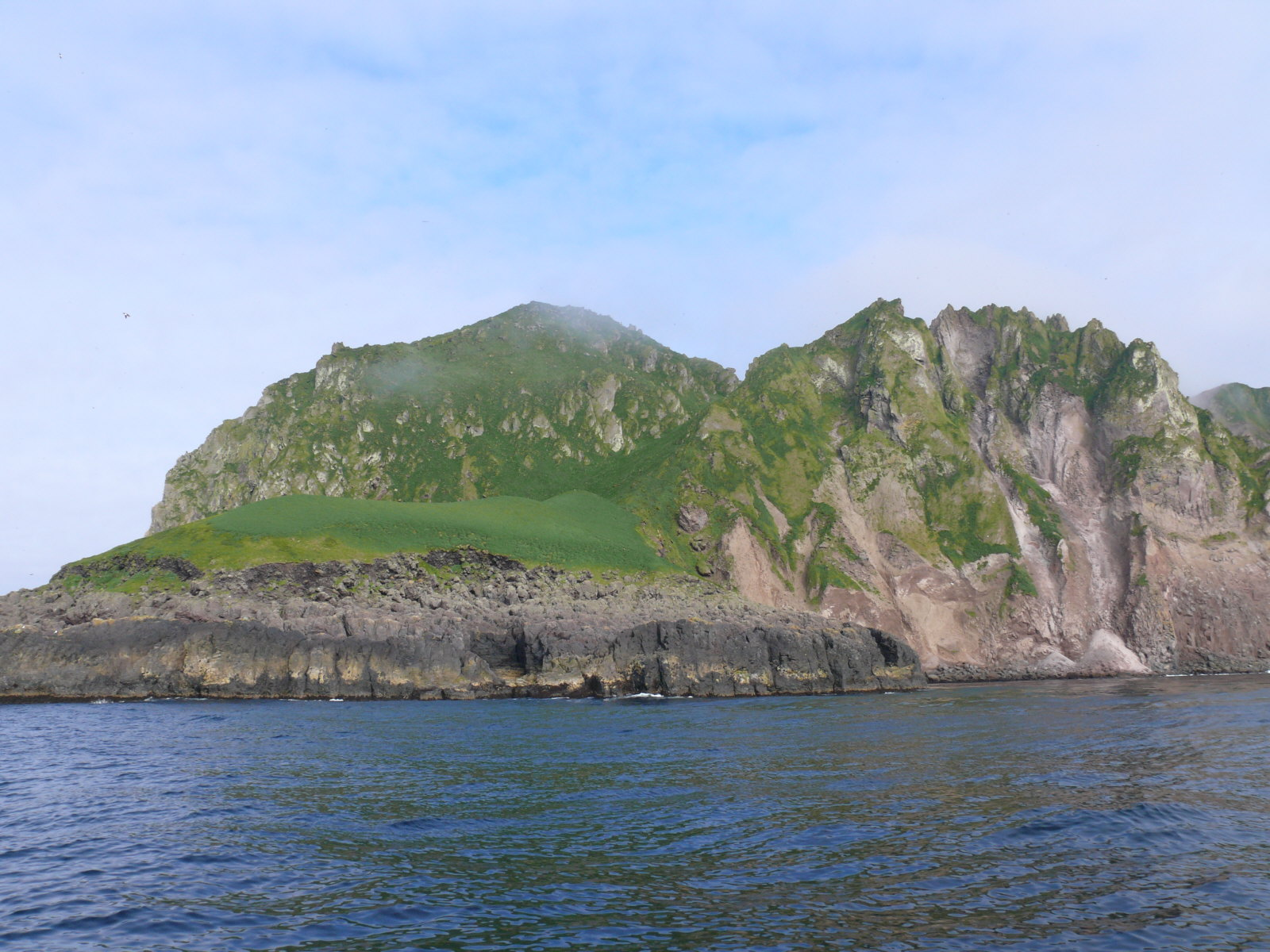
- Kaniuji Island, July 2008

Highest point
- Elevation: 896 ft (273 m)
- Coordinates: 51°59′16″N 176°35′30″W

Geography
- Location within Alaska

Geology
- Mountain type: Stratovolcano
- Volcanic arc: Aleutian Arc
- Last eruption: 1150 BC

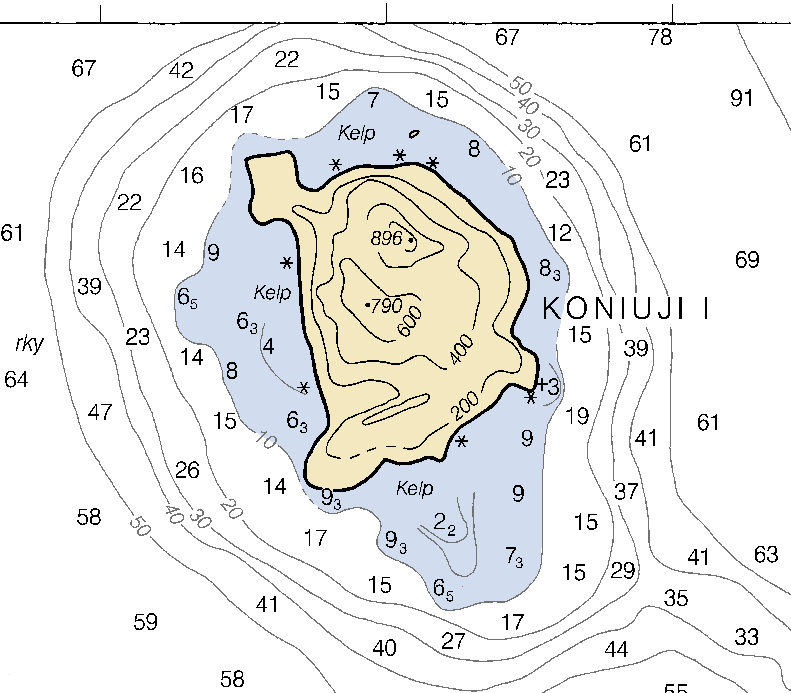
Nautical Chart of Kaniuji Island

Koniuji Island is one of the Andreanof Islands subgroup of the Aleutian Islands of southwestern Alaska, United States. It lies northwest of Atka Island and east of Kasatochi Island. Koniuji Island has a land area of 0.37 sq mi (237 acres) and is uninhabited. The name "Koniuji" is derived from Russian: конюга, romanized: konyuga "auklet", bestowed by Russian sailors in reference to the endemic seabirds. The Aleut name is Tanax̂silĝux̂ "the big made island", in reference to putative recent volcanic activity.

Koniuji Island is the emergent top of a mostly submarine stratovolcano. Little is known of the geologic history of this volcano. Reports of recent eruptive activity may be erroneous and are considered to refer to eruptions of Kasatochi volcano to the west. The last eruption of Koniuji Island was around 3,000 years ago, in approximately 1150 BC.

On all sides of Koniuji Island except the south and southeast, the shoreline is sheer and precipitous, rising to two sharp summits of 896 feet (273 m) and 790 feet (240 m). The south side of the island, above lower bluffs at the shore, slopes gradually to a ridge about 0.2 miles (0.3 km) north, and drops off again into a ravine that passes through the island at some elevation. The slope up from the south side is grass covered. The northwest end of the island is a low, flat, rocky point about 200 yards (180 m) long. An extensive kelp patch extends from the south of the island. Also, in the summer, heavy kelp is found along and well off the western shore.

Compass reading differences of as much as 10° from the normal variation have been observed on Koniuji Island and as much as 7° at a distance of 2 miles (3 km) in all directions around the island.

Koniuji Island provides nesting habitat for close to 300,000 seabirds. Around 70% are Fork-tailed Storm-petrels and 17% are Leach's Storm-petrel. There are also large numbers of the Ancient Murrelet and the Whiskered Auklet that nest on Koniuji. These four species breed on Koniuji Island in numbers that exceed 1% of their total global populations.

A 1998 survey found these birds on Koniuji during the breeding season:

Glaucous-winged Gull	300
Black-legged Kittiwake	2,246
Red-legged Kittiwake	28
Common Murre	449
Thick-billed Murre	1,299
Pigeon Guillemot	62
Ancient Murrelet	10,000
Parakeet Auklet	300
Crested Auklet	300
Whiskered Auklet	200
Least Auklet	2,000
Horned Puffin	200
Tufted Puffin	20,000
Leach's Storm-Petrel	50,000
Fork-tailed Storm-Petrel	200,000
