= 172nd meridian east =

Line of longitude

172nd meridian east

The meridian 172° east of Greenwich is a line of longitude that extends from the North Pole across the Arctic Ocean, Asia, the Pacific Ocean, New Zealand, the Southern Ocean, and Antarctica to the South Pole.

The 172nd meridian east forms a great circle with the 8th meridian west.

== From Pole to Pole ==
Starting at the North Pole and heading south to the South Pole, the 172nd meridian east passes through:

Co-ordinates	Country, territory or sea	Notes
90°0′N 172°0′E	Arctic Ocean	
73°27′N 172°0′E	East Siberian Sea	
69°59′N 172°0′E	Russia	Chukotka Autonomous Okrug; Kamchatka Krai — from 62°26′N 172°0′E
60°53′N 172°0′E	Bering Sea	
53°5′N 172°0′E	Pacific Ocean	Passing just east of Arno Atoll, Marshall Islands (at 7°7′N 171°56′E)
6°13′N 172°0′E	Marshall Islands	Mili Atoll
6°2′N 172°0′E	Pacific Ocean	Passing just west of Hunter Island, New Caledonia (claimed by Vanuatu) (at 22°24′S 172°5′E); Passing just west of the Three Kings Islands, New Zealand (at 34°10′S 172°2′E)
41°26′S 172°0′E	New Zealand	South Island – West Coast and Canterbury regions
43°58′S 172°0′E	Pacific Ocean	
60°0′S 172°0′E	Southern Ocean	
77°26′S 172°0′E	Antarctica	Ross Dependency, claimed by New Zealand

== See also ==
- 171st meridian east
- 173rd meridian east
