= 171st meridian east =

Line of longitude

171st meridian east

The meridian 171° east of Greenwich is a line of longitude that extends from the North Pole across the Arctic Ocean, Asia, the Pacific Ocean, New Zealand, the Southern Ocean, and Antarctica to the South Pole.

The 171st meridian east forms a great circle with the 9th meridian west.

== From Pole to Pole ==
Starting at the North Pole and heading south to the South Pole, the 171st meridian east passes through:

Co-ordinates	Country, territory or sea	Notes
90°0′N 171°0′E	Arctic Ocean	
73°41′N 171°0′E	East Siberian Sea	
70°5′N 171°0′E	Russia	Chukotka Autonomous Okrug; Kamchatka Krai — from 62°17′N 171°0′E
60°31′N 171°0′E	Bering Sea	
53°30′N 171°0′E	Pacific Ocean	Passing just east of the island of Mejit, Marshall Islands (at 10°17′N 170°53′E)
8°53′N 171°0′E	Marshall Islands	Maloelap Atoll
8°39′N 171°0′E	Pacific Ocean	Passing just west of Aur Atoll, Marshall Islands (at 8°13′N 171°1′E); Passing just west of Majuro Atoll, Marshall Islands (at 7°8′N 171°2′E)
42°41′S 171°0′E	New Zealand	South Island — passing just east of the town of Oamaru (at 45°4′N 170°58′E)
45°5′S 171°0′E	Pacific Ocean	
60°0′S 171°0′E	Southern Ocean	
77°20′S 171°0′E	Antarctica	Ross Dependency, claimed by New Zealand

== See also ==
- 170th meridian east
- 172nd meridian east
