= 171st Division (People's Republic of China) =

171st Division (1949–50)
- Active: 1949.4 - 1950.8
- Country: People's Republic of China
- Branch: People's Liberation Army
- Type: Division
- Role: Infantry

The 171st Division(Chinese: 第171师) was created in April 1949 under the Regulation of the Redesignations of All Organizations and Units of the Army, issued by Central Military Commission on November 1, 1948, basing on the 6th Training and Consolidation Division of Northeastern Military Region. The division was put under control of Liaodong Military District.

The division was basically a second-line unit and never went into battle.

In 1949 its commander was Chang Jui-sheng. A CIA report of March 1950 placed it within the 57th Army, alongside the 169th and 171st divisions, with an assessed total army strength of 15,000.

In July 1950, the 511th Regiment was absorbed into 39th Corps.

In August 1950, the rest of the division was disbanded and absorbed into the Air Force.

As of July 1950 the division was composed of:

- 511th Regiment;
- 512th Regiment;
- 513th Regiment.
