= 172nd Division (People's Republic of China) =

172nd Division (1949) 4th Independent Division of Hubei Military District (1949-50)
- Active: 1949.2 - 1950.4
- Country: People's Republic of China
- Branch: People's Liberation Army
- Type: Division
- Role: Infantry
- Part of: 58th Corps
- Engagements: Chinese Civil War

The 172nd Division (Chinese: 第172师) was created in February 1949 under the Regulation of the Redesignations of All Organizations and Units of the Army, issued by Central Military Commission on November 1, 1948, basing on the 28th Brigade of Tongbai Military District. Its history could be traced to Independent Brigade of Jinan Military District formed in December 1945.

The division was composed of 514th, 515th and 516th Infantry Regiments. As a part of 58th Corps, during the Chinese Civil War the division took part in the creation of Tongbai base area and Xiangfan Campaign.

In June 1949 the division was renamed as 4th Independent Division of Hubei Military District(Chinese: 湖北军区独立第4师).

In February 1950 the division was inactivated. Its headquarters merged with Engineer Command, Fourth Field Army.
