= 172nd Regiment =

172nd Regiment may refer to:

- 172nd Cavalry Regiment, previously the 172nd Infantry Regiment (before 1964)
- 172nd Infantry Regiment (United States, 1982–present)
- 172nd Field Artillery Regiment, United States
- 172nd Field Regiment, Royal Artillery, Great Britain

== American Civil War regiments ==
- 172nd Ohio Infantry Regiment
- 172nd Pennsylvania Infantry Regiment
