= Chukchi Peninsula =

Peninsula on the eastern coast of Siberia

Chukchi Peninsula Чуко́тский полуо́стров
- Interactive map of Chukchi Peninsula
- Country: Russia

Area
  - Total: 49,423 km^{2} (19,082 sq mi)

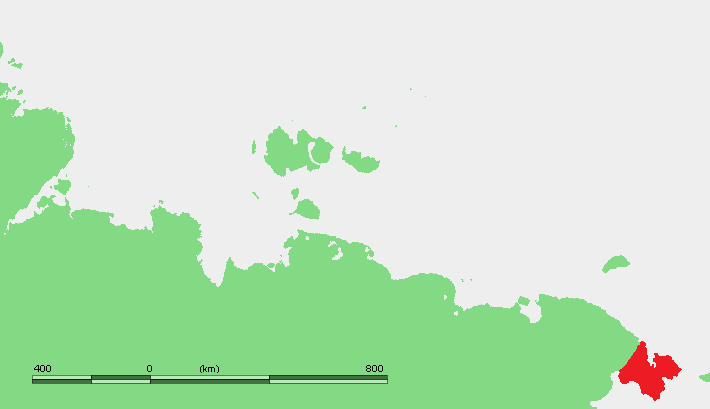
Location of the Chukchi Peninsula in Far East Siberia.

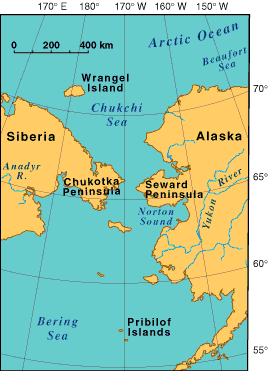
Map showing the proximity of the Chukchi peninsula in Russia to the Seward Peninsula in America.

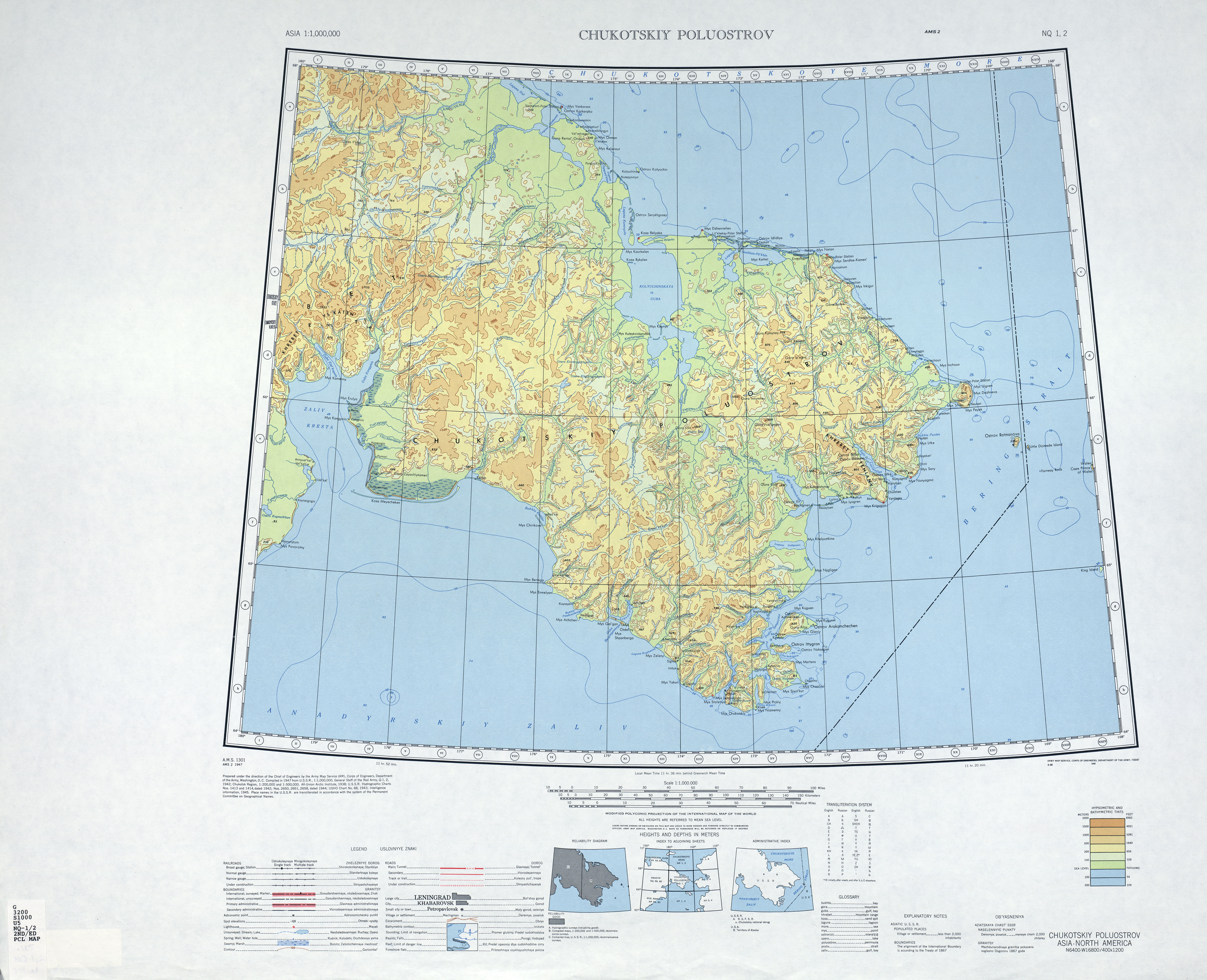
Chukchi Peninsula. US military map 1947.

The Chukchi Peninsula (also Chukotka Peninsula or Chukotski Peninsula; Russian: Чуко́тский полуо́стров, Chukotskiy poluostrov, short form Russian: Чуко́тка, Chukotka) is the on the eastern coast of Siberia. Located at about 66° N 172° W, it is the easternmost point of continental Asia.

== Peninsula ==
Its eastern end is at Cape Dezhnev near the village of Uelen. The Chukotka Mountains are located in the central/western part of the peninsula, which is bounded by the Chukchi Sea to the north, the Bering Sea to the south, and the Bering Strait to the east, where at its easternmost point it is only about 60 km (37 mi) from Seward Peninsula in Alaska; this is the smallest distance between the land masses of Eurasia and North America. The peninsula is part of Chukotka Autonomous Okrug of Russia.

The peninsula is traditionally the home of tribes of the indigenous peoples of Siberia as well as some Russian settlers. It lies along the Northern Sea Route, or Northeast Passage. Industries on the peninsula are mining (tin, lead, zinc, gold, and coal), hunting and trapping, reindeer raising, and fishing.

In the Bering Strait about halfway between the peninsula and the Seward Peninsula are the fairly small Diomede Islands; the western one is Big Diomede, Russia and the eastern one is Little Diomede Island, Alaska. The much larger St. Lawrence Island, Alaska, is about 50 km (31 mi) southeast of the peninsula's southernmost point.

The Eturerveyem River flows into Kolyuchin Bay on the peninsula.

== See also ==
- Arctic Alaska-Chukotka terrane
- Providence Bay
- Chukotka sled-dog
