= Cantons and communes of Gabon =

As of 2011, Gabon contains 152 Cantons, 52 Communes, 29 Arrondissements, and 26 Districts. These are the third-level administrative units of Gabon and between them make up the units of the Departments of Gabon. Arrondissements tend to be units of major cities such as Libreville and communes are generally seated in the main cities and towns and incorporating the surrounding rural area. The cantons of Gabon are largely rural in nature with a small town or large village as the main centre.

== Estuaire Province ==
=== Commune of Libreville ===
- Premier Arrondissement
- Deuxième Arrondissement
- Troisième Arrondissement
- Quatrième Arrondissement
- Cinquième Arrondissement
- Sixième Arrondissement

=== Komo (Kango) ===
- Commune of Kango
- Canton of Bokoué
- Canton of Engong
- Canton of Komo

=== Komo-Mondah (Ntoum) ===
- Commune of Ntoum
- Commune of Owendo
- Canton of Ikoy-Tsini
- Canton of Komo-Ntoum
- Canton of Mbéi
- Canton of Océan-Gongoué

=== Komo-Océan (Ndzomoé) ===
- Commune of Ndzomoé
- Canton of Remboué-Gongoué
- Canton of Océan-Gongoué

=== Noya (Cocobeach) ===
- Commune of Cocobeach
- Canton of Mouni-Noya
- Canton of Océan-Mondah

== Haut-Ogooué Province ==
=== Commune of Franceville ===
- Premier Arrondissement
- Deuxième Arrondissement
- Troisième Arrondissement
- Quatrième Arrondissement

=== Bayi-Brikolo (Aboumi) ===
- Commune of Aboumi
- Canton of Brikolo

=== Djoue (Onga) ===
- Commune of Onga
- Canton of Gayi
- Canton of Mpani

=== Djououri-Aguilli (Bongoville) ===
- Commune of Bongoville
- Canton of Kayié
- Canton of Lékeye

=== Lékabi-Léwolo (Ngouoni) ===
- Commune of Ngouoni
- Canton of Ekoula
- Canton of Enkoro (Ngatara)
- Canton of Ngoua

=== Lekoni-Lekori (Akieni) ===
- Commune of Akiéni
- Canton of Lébényi
- Canton of Lessimi
- Canton of Léwoumou
- Canton of Limi

=== Lekoko (Bakoumba) ===
- Commune of Bakoumba
- Canton of Lébombi
- Canton of Miagassa

=== Leboumbi-Leyou (Moanda) ===
- Commune of Moanda
- Canton of Lébombi-Lékédi
- Canton of Lékédi-Leyou
- Commune of Mounana

=== Mpassa (Franceville) ===
- Canton of Kassa
- Canton of Lekabi
- Canton of Ndjoumou

=== Ogooué-Létili (Boumango) ===
- Commune of Boumango
- Canton of Loula
- Canton of Maloundou

=== Plateaux (Leconi) ===
- Commune of Léconi
- Canton of Djouélé-Laboumi
- Canton of Djouya
- Canton of Louri

=== Sebe-Brikolo (Okondja) ===
- Commune of Okandja
- Canton of Louami-Lélama
- Canton of Lékori
- Canton of Lekala
- Canton of Mouniandzi
- Canton of Sébé-Louri

== Moyen-Ogooué Province ==
=== Abanga-Bigne (Ndjole) ===
- Commune of Ndjolé
- Canton of Bifoun-Wéliga
- Canton of Ebel-Abanga
- Canton of Ebel-Alembé
- Canton of Samkita

=== Ogooue et des Lacs (Lambaréné) ===
- Commune of Lambaréné
- Canton of Lacs-du-Nord
- Canton of Lacs-du-Sud
- Canton of Ogooué-Amont
- Canton of Ogooué-Aval
- Canton of Ogooué-Mbiné
- Canton of Ogooué-Ngounié
- Canton of Route de Fougamou

== Ngounié Province ==
=== Boumi-Louetsi (Mbigou) ===
- Commune of Mbigou
- Canton of Bagandou-Ngounié
- Canton of Basse-Louétsi
- Canton of Doua
- Canton of Louétsi-Boumi
- Canton of Ngounié-Louétsi
- Canton of Wano-Ivindzi

=== Dola (Ndende) ===
- Commune of Ndendé
- Canton of Dola-Nord
- Canton of Dola-Sud

=== Douya-Onoye (Mouila) ===
- Commune of Mouila
- Canton of Dibadi
- Canton of Dikoka
- Canton of Ngounié-Centre

=== Louetsi-Bibaka (Malinga) ===
- Commune of Malinga
- Canton of Haute-Bibaka
- Canton of Haute-Louétsi

=== Louetsi-Wano (Lébamba) ===
- Commune of Lébamba
- Canton of Soungou
- Canton of Wanou-Biroundou

=== Mougalaba (Guiétsou) ===
- Commune of Guiétsou
- Canton of Basse-Mougalaba
- Canton of Haute-Mougalaba

=== Ndolou (Mandji) ===
- Commune of Mandji
- Canton of Doubanga
- Canton of Dourembou
- Canton of Koumou
- Canton of Péni

=== Ogoulou (Mimongo) ===
- Commune of Mimongo
- Canton of Dibwa
- Canton of Haute-Dikobi
- Canton of Haute-Ogoulou
- Canton of Ogoulou-Onoye
- Canton of Omba
- Canton of Vieux-Mimongo

=== Tsamba-Magotsi (Fougamou) ===
- Commune of Fougamou
- Canton of Banda
- Canton of Dibwa
- Canton of Oumba
- Canton of Sindara
- Canton of Tandou

== Nyanga Province ==
=== Basse-Banio (Mayumba) ===
- Commune of Mayumba
- Canton of Loubetsi-Divoungou
- Canton of Mayombé
- Canton of Mouwambi

=== Douigni (Moabi) ===
- Commune of Moabi
- Canton Douami-Mouembi
- Canton Doubandji
- Canton Migamba-Yara

=== Doutsila (Mabanda) ===
- Commune of Mabanda
- Canton of Haute-Dola
- Canton of Haute-Ngongo

=== Haute-Banio (Ndindi) ===
- Commune of Ndindi
- Canton of Lagune
- Canton of Louzibi

=== Mongo (Moulèngui-Binza) ===
- Commune of Moulèngui-Binza
- Canton of Douki
- Canton of Voungou

=== Mougoutsi (Tchibanga) ===
- Commune of Tchibanga
- Canton of Doughegny
- Canton of Doussegoussou
- Canton of Mougalaba-Divoungou

== Ogooué-Ivindo Province ==
=== Ivindo (Makokou) ===
- Commune of Makokou
- Canton of Aboye
- Canton of Ivindo
- Canton of Liboumba
- Canton of Mouniandzi
- Canton of Ntang-Louli

=== Lope (Booue) ===
- Commune of Booué
- Canton of Fieng-Okano
- Canton of Lélédi
- Canton of Lézinda
- Canton of Nké
- Canton of Offoue-Aval

=== Mvoung (Ovan) ===
- Commune of Ovan
- Canton of Belémé
- Canton of Dzoué

=== Zadie (Mekambo) ===
- Commune of Mékambo
- Canton of Bengoué
- Canton of Djouah
- Canton of Loué
- Canton of Sassamongo

== Ogooué-Lolo Province ==
=== Lolo-Bouenguidi (Koulamoutou) ===
- Commune of Koulamoutou
- Canton of Basse-Lombo
- Canton of Bouénguidi-Moualo
- Canton of Lolo-Wagna
- Canton of Moualo-Onoye

=== Lombo-Bouenguidi (Pana) ===
- Commune of Pana
- Canton of Haute-Bouénguidi
- Canton of Haute-Lombo

=== Mouloundou (Lastoursville) ===
- Commune of Lastoursville
- Canton of Lassio-Sébé
- Canton of Léyou
- Canton of Ogooué-Amont
- Canton of Ogooué-Aval
- Canton of Poungui

=== Offoué-Onoye (Iboundji) ===
- Commune of Iboundji
- Canton of Offoué
- Canton of Onoye

== Ogooué-Maritime Province ==
=== Bendje (Port-Gentil) ===
- Commune of Port-Gentil
- Canton of Lac Anengué
- Canton of Océan
- Canton of Ogooué

=== Etimboue (Omboue) ===
- Commune of Omboué
- Canton of Lagune-Ngooué
- Canton of Lagune-Nkomi
- Canton of Rembo-Nkomi

=== Ndougou (Gamba) ===
- Commune of Gamba
- Canton of Basse-Nyanga
- Canton of Lagune-Ndougou
- Canton of Rembo-Bongou

== Woleu-Ntem Province ==
=== Haut-Komo (Medouneu) ===
- Commune of Médouneu
- Canton of Komo-Abanga
- Canton of Mbéy

=== Haut-Ntem (Minvoul) ===
- Commune of Minvoul
- Canton of Nord
- Canton of Sossolo-Ntem
- Canton of Sud

=== Ntem (Bitam) ===
- Commune of Bitam
- Canton of Ekorété
- Canton of Kess
- Canton of Koum
- Canton of Mboa'a
- Canton of Mvézé
- Canton of Ntem I
- Canton of Ntem II

=== Okano (Mitzic) ===
- Commune of Mitzic
- Canton of Doum
- Canton of Doumandzou
- Canton of Lalara
- Canton of Okala

=== Woleu (Oyem) ===
- Commune of Oyem
- Canton of Bissok
- Canton of Ellelem
- Canton of Kyé
- Canton of Nyè
- Canton of Woleu
