= Departments of Gabon =

The provinces of Gabon are divided into forty-nine departments. The departments are listed below, by province (capitals in parentheses):

Departments of Gabon

== Estuaire Province ==
- Komo Department (Kango)
- Komo-Mondah Department (Ntoum)
- Noya Department (Cocobeach)
- Komo-Océan Department (Ndzomoe)
- Libreville (department & capital city)

The Department of Cap Estérias (Cap Estérias) was deleted in 2013.

== Haut-Ogooué Province ==
- Djoue Department (Onga)
- Djououri-Aguilli Department (Bongoville)
- Lekoni-Lekori Department (Akiéni)
- Lekoko Department (Bakoumba)
- Leboumbi-Leyou Department (Moanda)
- Mpassa Department (Franceville)
- Plateaux Department (Leconi)
- Sebe-Brikolo Department (Okondja)
- Ogooué-Létili Department (Boumango)
- Lékabi-Léwolo Department (Ngouoni)
- Bayi-Brikolo Department (Aboumi)

== Moyen-Ogooué Province ==
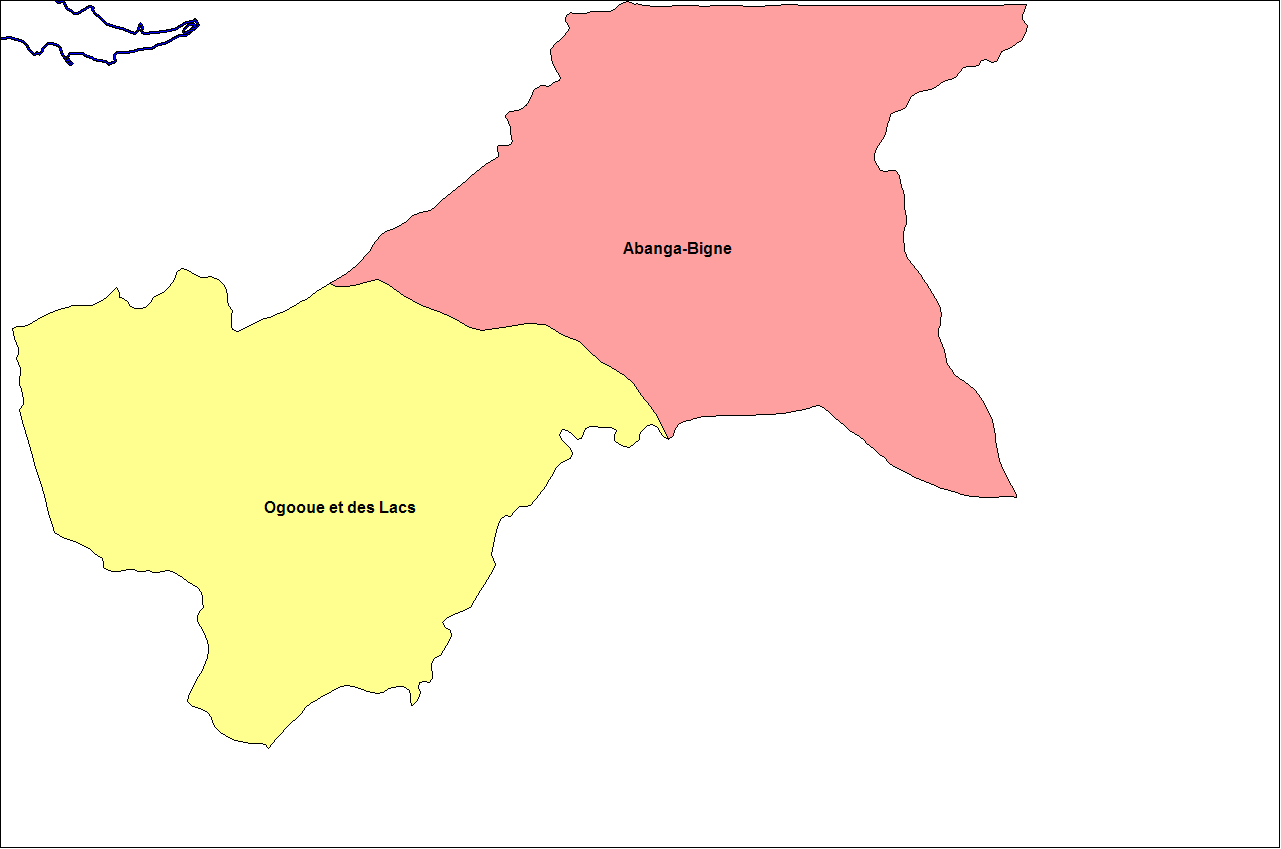
Departments of Moyen-Ogooué

- Abanga-Bigne Department (Ndjole)
- Ogooué et des Lacs Department (Lambaréné)

== Ngounié Province ==
- Boumi-Louetsi Department (Mbigou)
- Dola Department (Ndendé)
- Douya-Onoy Department (Mouila)
- Louetsi-Wano Department (Lébamba)
- Ndolou Department (Mandji)
- Ogoulou Department (Mimongo)
- Tsamba-Magotsi Department (Fougamou)
- Louetsi-Bibaka Department (Malinga)
- Mougalaba Department (Guietsou)

== Nyanga Province ==
- Basse-Banio Department (Mayumba)
- Douigni Department (Moabi)
- Haute-Banio Department (Ndindi)
- Mougoutsi Department (Tchibanga)
- Doutsila Department (Mabanda)
- Mongo Department (Binza)

== Ogooué-Ivindo Province ==
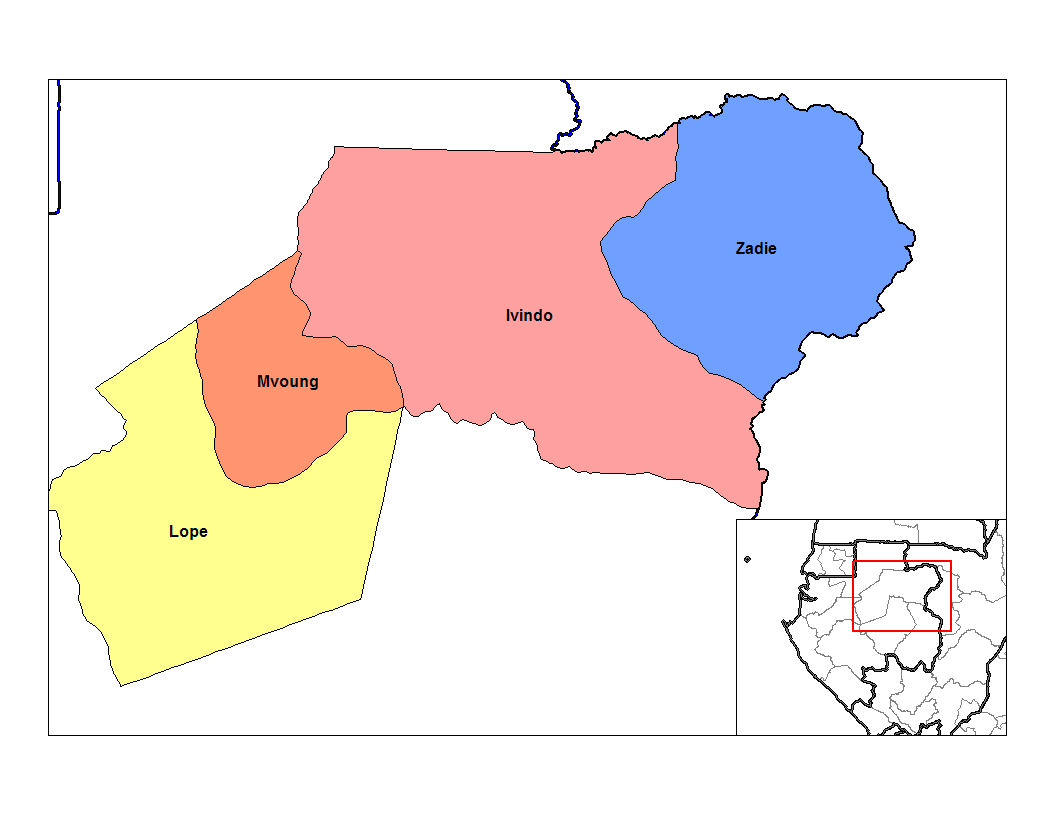
Departments of Ogooué-Ivindo

- Ivindo Department (Makokou)
- Lope Department (Booué)
- Mvoung Department (Ovan)
- Zadie Department (Mekambo)

== Ogooué-Lolo Province ==
- Lolo-Bouenguidi Department (Koulamoutou)
- Lombo-Bouenguidi Department (Pana)
- Mouloundou Department (Lastoursville)
- Offoué-Onoye Department (Iboundji)

== Ogooué-Maritime Province ==
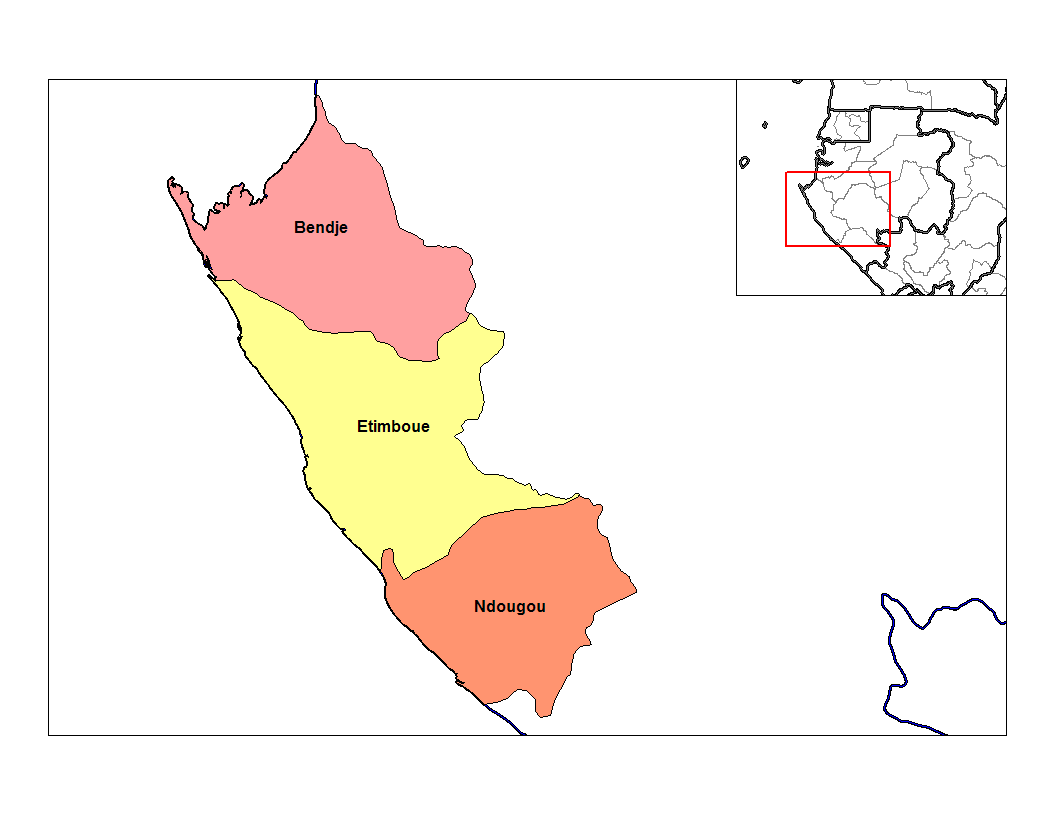
Departments of Ogooué-Maritime

- Bendje Department (Port-Gentil)
- Etimboue Department (Omboue)
- Ndougou Department (Gamba)

== Woleu-Ntem Province ==
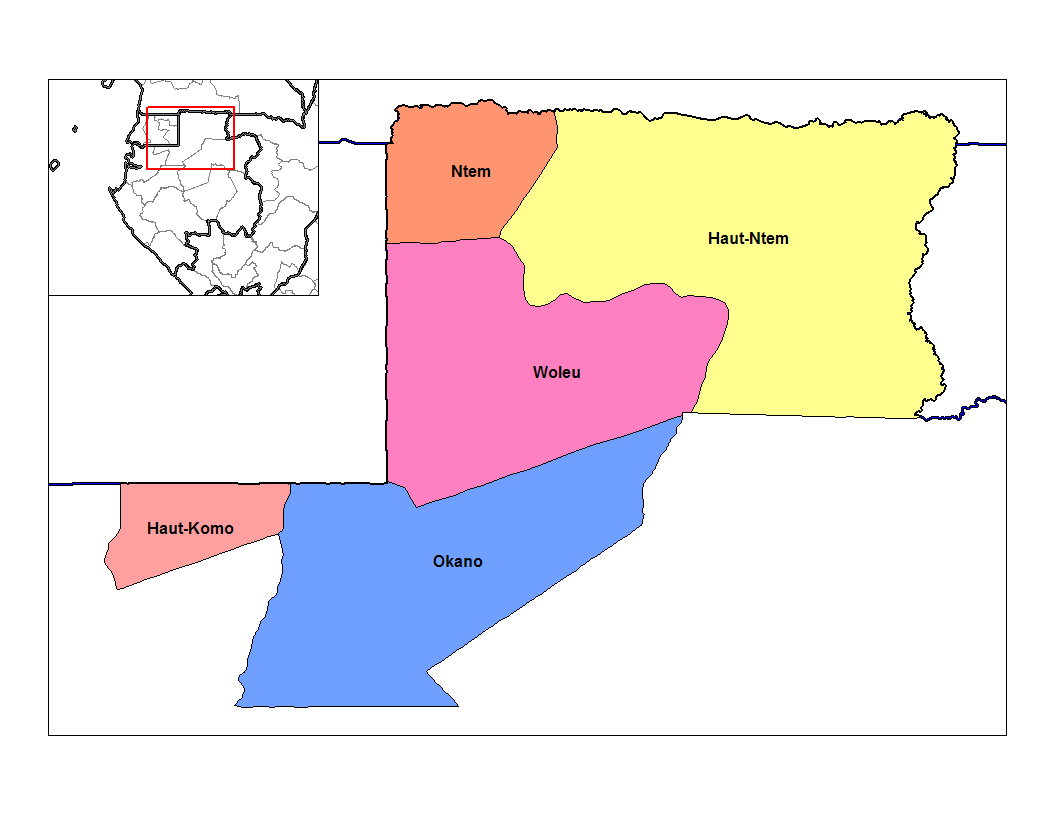
Departments of Woleu-Ntem

- Haut-Komo Department (Medouneu)
- Haut-Ntem Department (Minvoul)
- Ntem Department (Bitam)
- Okano Department (Mitzic)
- Woleu Department (Oyem)

== See also ==
- Provinces of Gabon
