= List of Gabonese provinces by Human Development Index =

This is a list of Gabonese provinces by Human Development Index as of 2023.

Note: Libreville (capital of Gabon and Estuaire Province) and Port Gentil (capital of Ogooué-Maritime Province and second-largest city) are grouped and have their own HDI.

Rank	Province	HDI (2023)
High human development
1	Libreville and Port Gentil	0.758
2	Estuaire	0.750
-	Gabon	0.733
3	Haut-Ogooué	0.707
4	Ogooue Maritime	0.700
Medium human development
5	Moyen-Ogooué	0.692
6	Woleu-Ntem	0.690
7	Nyanga	0.671
8	Ogooué-Lolo	0.666
9	Ngounié	0.663
10	Ogooué-Ivindo	0.631
