= Subdivisions of Gabon =

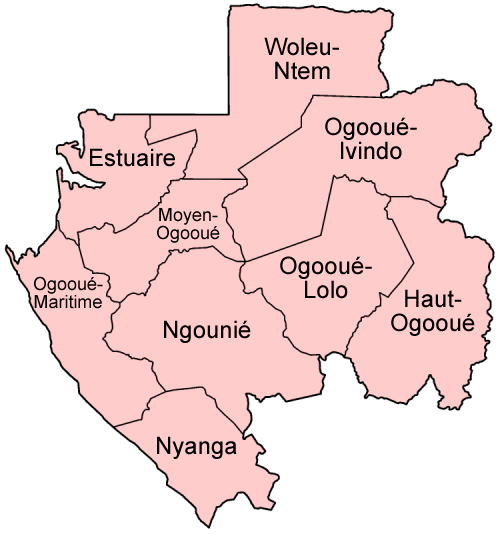
Map of the provinces of Gabon

Gabon is divided into nine provinces, which are further divided into 49 departments.

== Provinces ==
Flag	Map	Province	Capital	Population (2013)	Area (km^{2})
		Estuaire	Akanda	895,689	20,740
		Haut-Ogooué	Franceville	250,799	36,547
		Moyen-Ogooué	Lambaréné	69,287	18,535
		Ngounié	Mouila	100,838	37,750
		Nyanga	Tchibanga	52,854	21,285
		Ogooué-Ivindo	Makokou	63,293	46,075
		Ogooué-Lolo	Koulamoutou	65,771	25,380
		Ogooué-Maritime	Port-Gentil	157,562	22,890
		Woleu-Ntem	Oyem	154,986	38,465

== See also ==
- ISO 3166-2:GA
