= Ayem =

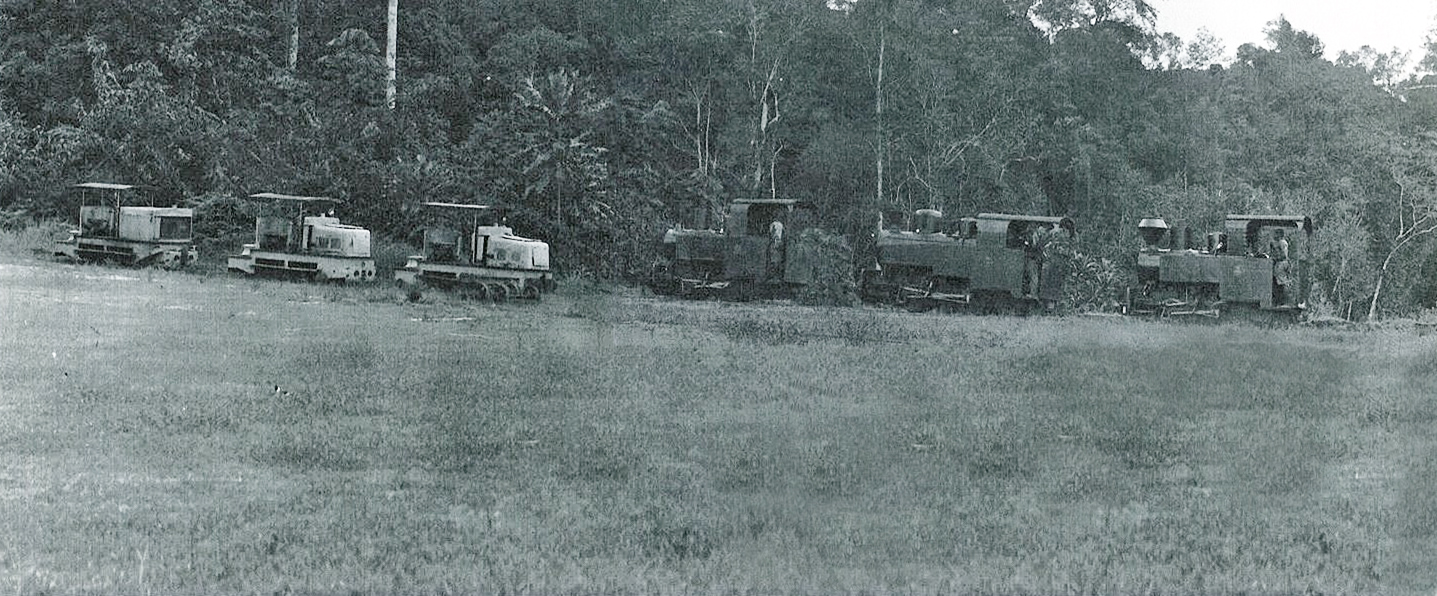
- Three Decauville steam locomotives and three Campagne rail tractors on a forest railway at the Société Legros in Aguémoné near Ayem, ca 1935

- Location in Gabon
- Coordinates: 0°5′0″N 11°22′0″E
- Country: Gabon
- Province: Ogooué-Ivindo
- Department: Mvoung Department

Ayem is a town in central western Gabon. It is located in Mvoung Department, Ogooué-Ivindo Province. The town is near the Equator, which lies just 5.5 miles (8.9 km) to the south.

== Transport ==
In 2022, poor road conditions combined with a landslide deteriorated Ayem's access to the outside world, making it challenging to import essential goods.

Ayem has a small station on the Trans-Gabon Railway.

== See also ==
- Transport in Gabon
