= Mounana =

- Town
- Location in Gabon
- Coordinates: 1°24′5″S 13°9′41″E
- Country: Gabon
- Province: Haut-Ogooué
- Department: Lemboumbi-Leyou

Population (1993)
  - Total: 6,372
- Time zone: UTC+1 (WAT)

Mounana is a town in Gabon. It lies on the N3 road and from 1958 until the 1990s was a major uranium mining centre. The mine is now closed, and it is now primarily a centre for agriculture. According to the 1993 census it had a population of 6,372 and in 2013 it had an estimated population of 12,437.
