= Plateaux =

Plateaux is the plural form of the word plateau in French, and is sometimes used as the plural form of the same word in English. It is also the name of the following places:

- Plateaux Department (Republic of the Congo)
- Plateaux Department (Gabon)
- Plateaux Region, Togo
- Plateaux District, a former district of the Democratic Republic of the Congo
