= Médouneu Airport =

Airport in Gabon

Médouneu Airport Aéroport de Médouneu
- IATA: MDV; ICAO: none

Summary
- Serves: Médouneu
- Elevation AMSL: 2,100 ft / 640 m
- Coordinates: 1°00′25″N 10°45′20″E

Map
- Location of the airport in Gabon

Runways
Direction	Length		Surface
Direction	m	ft	Surface
17/35	1,400	4,593	Grass
- Source: HERE/Nokia GCM Google Maps

Médouneu Airport (French: Aéroport de Médouneu) (IATA: MDV) is an airport serving Médouneu in Woleu-Ntem Province, Gabon. The runway is 4 kilometres (2.5 mi) west of the village.

== See also ==
- Transport in Gabon
- List of airports in Gabon
