= Ivindo =

Ivindo may refer to:

- Ivindo River, Gabon
- Ivindo Department, Gabon
- Ivindo National Park, Gabon
