= OKN =

OKN may refer to:

- OKN, the IATA code for Okondja Airport, an airport in Okondja, Gabon
- OKN, the National Rail code for Oakengates railway station, Shropshire, England
- OK-N, the secondary direct-drive class in kart racing competition sanctioned by the CIK-FIA
