= Ogooué et des Lacs (department) =

Coordinates: 0°42′S 10°13′E

- Department
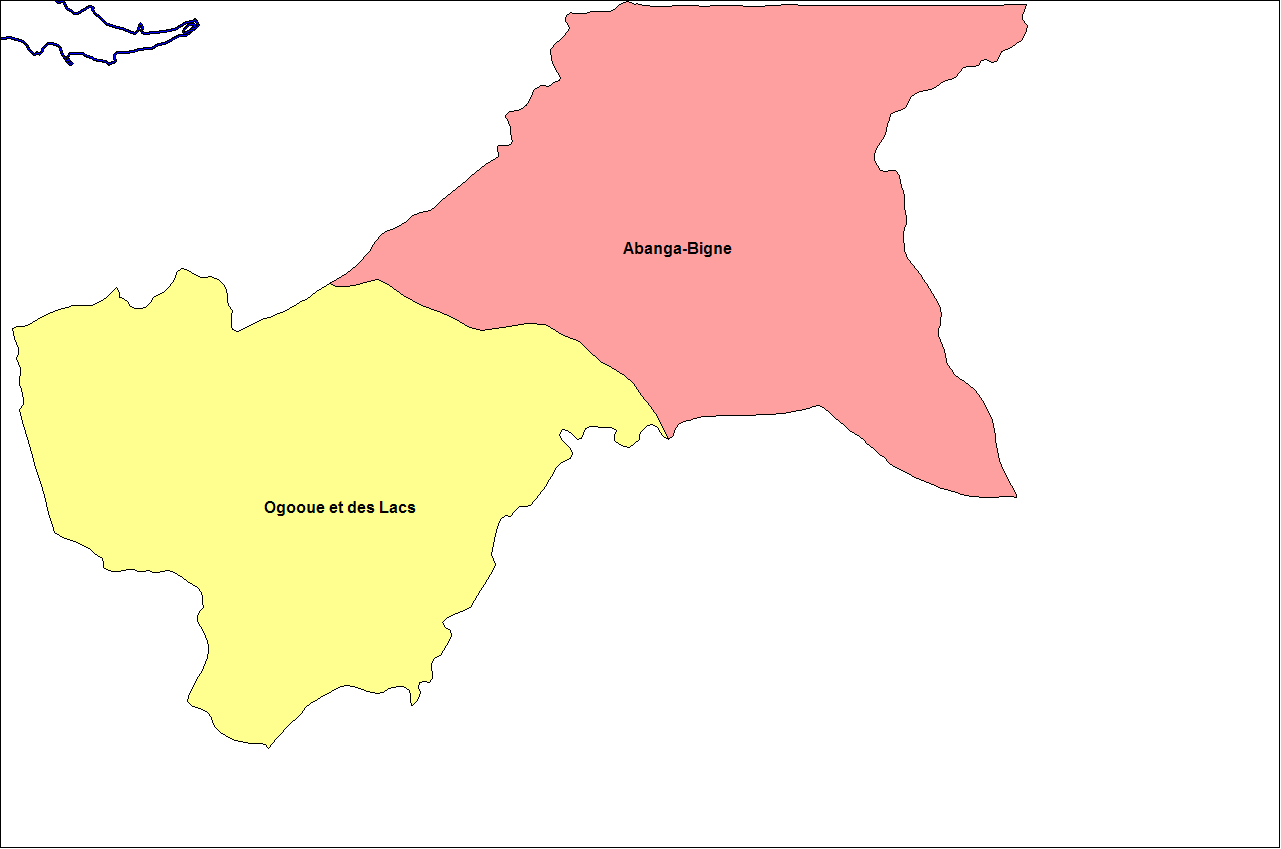
- Ogooue et des Lacs Department in the region
- Country: Gabon
- Province: Moyen-Ogooué Province

Population (2013 Census)
  - Total: 54,346
- Time zone: UTC+1 (GMT +1)

Ogooué et des Lacs is a department of Moyen-Ogooué Province in western Gabon. Its capital is also the province's capital, Lambaréné. It had a population of 54,346 in 2013.

== Towns and villages ==
- Bindo
