= Djoue (department) =

Coordinates: 0°51′29″S 14°16′12″E

- Department
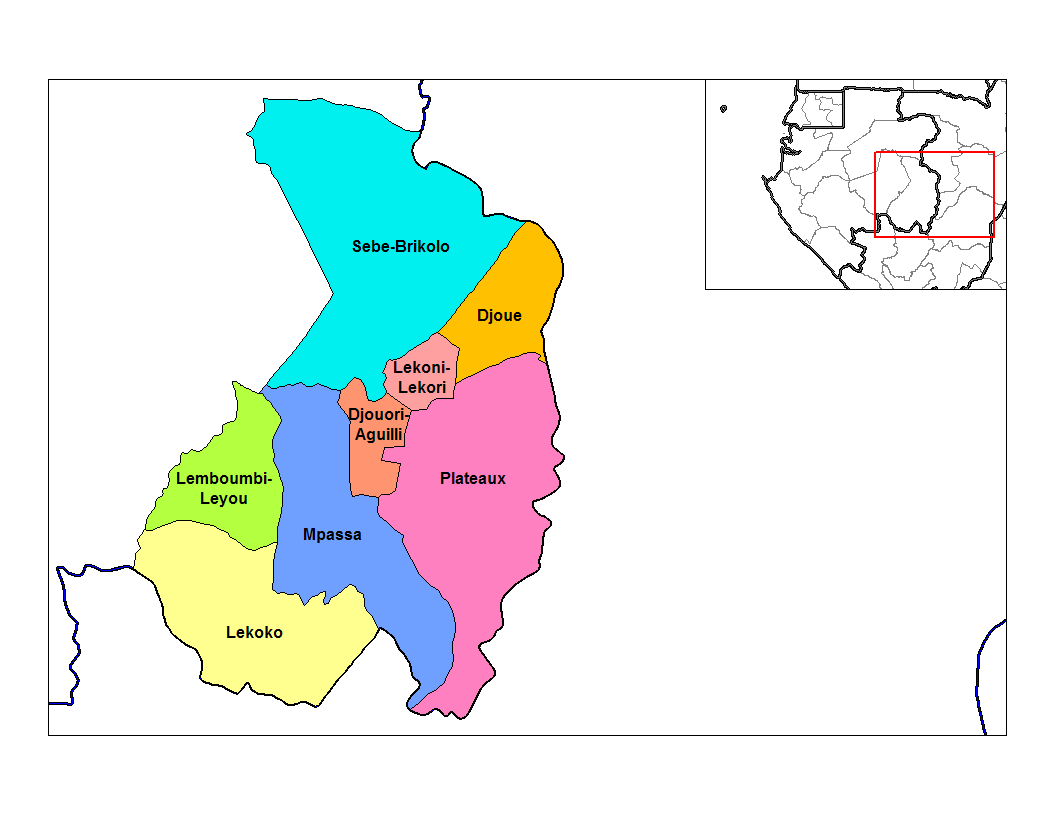
- Djoue Department in the region
- Country: Gabon
- Province: Haut-Ogooué Province

Population (2013 Census)
  - Total: 2,178
- Time zone: UTC+1 (GMT +1)

Djoue is a department of Haut-Ogooué Province in south-eastern Gabon. The capital lies at Onga. It had a population of 2,178 in 2013.
