= Djououri-Aguilli (department) =

Coordinates: 1°38′50″S 13°51′48″E

Djouori-Agnili
- Department
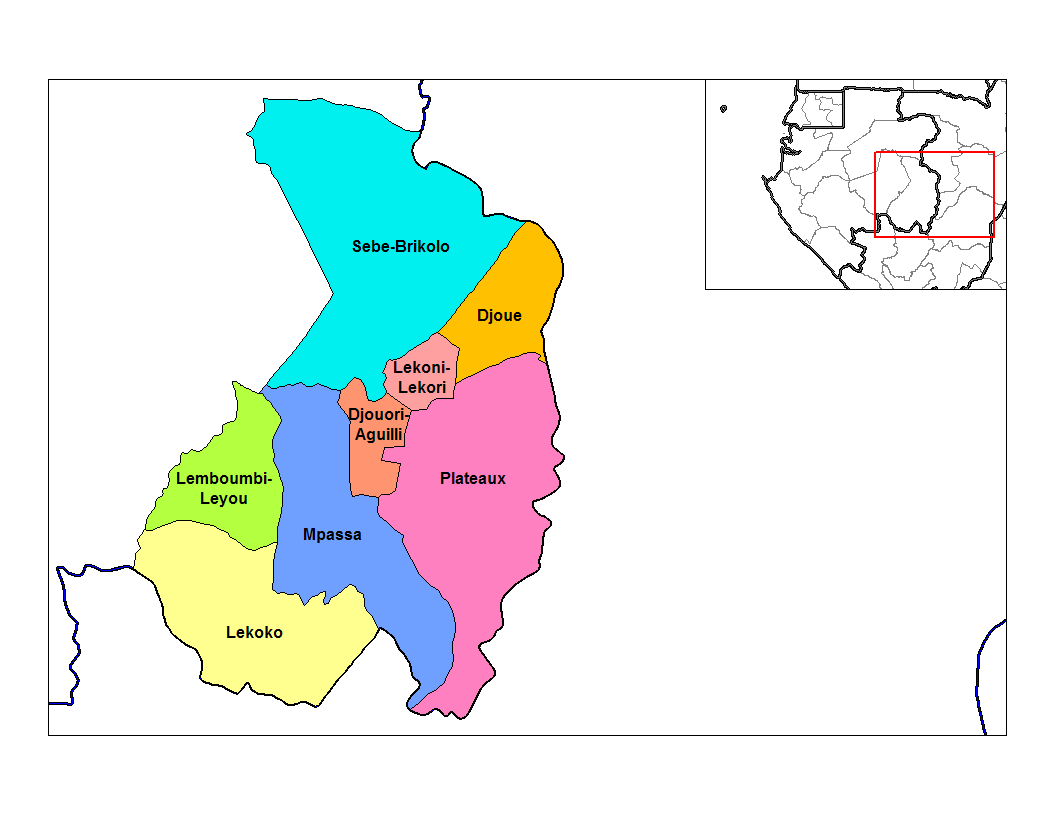
- Djouori-Agnili Department in the region
- Country: Gabon
- Province: Haut-Ogooué Province

Population (2013 Census)
  - Total: 4,210
- Time zone: UTC+1 (GMT +1)

Djouori-Agnili is a department of Haut-Ogooué Province in south-eastern Gabon. The capital lies at Bongoville. It had a population of 4,210 in 2013.
