= Bayi-Brikolo (department) =

- Department
- Country: Gabon
- Province: Haut-Ogooué Province

Population (2013 Census)
  - Total: 1,998

Bayi-Brikolo is a department of Haut-Ogooué Province in Gabon. It had a population of 1,998 in 2013.
