= Mougalaba (department) =

- Department
- Location within Gabon
- Coordinates: 2°11′S 10°40′E
- Country: Gabon
- Province: Ngounié Province

Population (2013 Census)
  - Total: 1,490

Mougalaba is a department of Ngounié Province in Gabon. It had a population of 1,490 in 2013.
