= Offoué-Onoye (department) =

- Department
- Location within Gabon
- Country: Gabon
- Province: Ogooué-Lolo Province

Population (2013 Census)
  - Total: 2,743

Offoué-Onoye is a department of Ogooué-Lolo Province in Gabon. It had a population of 2,743 in 2013.
