= Okondja Airport =

Okondja Airport Aéroport d'Okondja
- IATA: OKN; ICAO: FOGQ

Summary
- Serves: Okondja
- Elevation AMSL: 1,325 ft / 404 m
- Coordinates: 0°40′00″S 13°40′25″E

Map
- Location of the airport in Gabon

Runways
Direction	Length		Surface
Direction	m	ft	Surface
08/26	1,500	4,921	Asphalt
- Source: GCM

Okondja Airport (French: Aéroport d'Okondja) (IATA: OKN, ICAO: FOGQ) is an airport serving Okondja in Haut-Ogooué Province, Gabon.

== See also ==
- List of airports in Gabon
- Transport in Gabon
