= Lékabi-Léwolo (department) =

- Department
- Country: Gabon
- Province: Haut-Ogooué Province

Population (2013 Census)
  - Total: 4,914

Lékabi-Léwolo is a department of Haut-Ogooué Province in Gabon. It had a population of 4,914 in 2013.
