= Lombo-Bouenguidi (department) =

Coordinates: 1°45′24″S 12°38′30″E

Lombo
- Department
- Lombo-Bouenguidi Department in the region
- Country: Gabon
- Province: Ogooué-Lolo Province

Population (2013 Census)
  - Total: 4,635
- Time zone: UTC+1 (GMT +1)

Lombo-Bouenguidi is a department of Ogooué-Lolo Province in eastern Gabon. The capital lies at Pana. It had a population of 4,635 in 2013.
