= Ndolou (department) =

Coordinates: 1°44′S 10°10′E

- Department
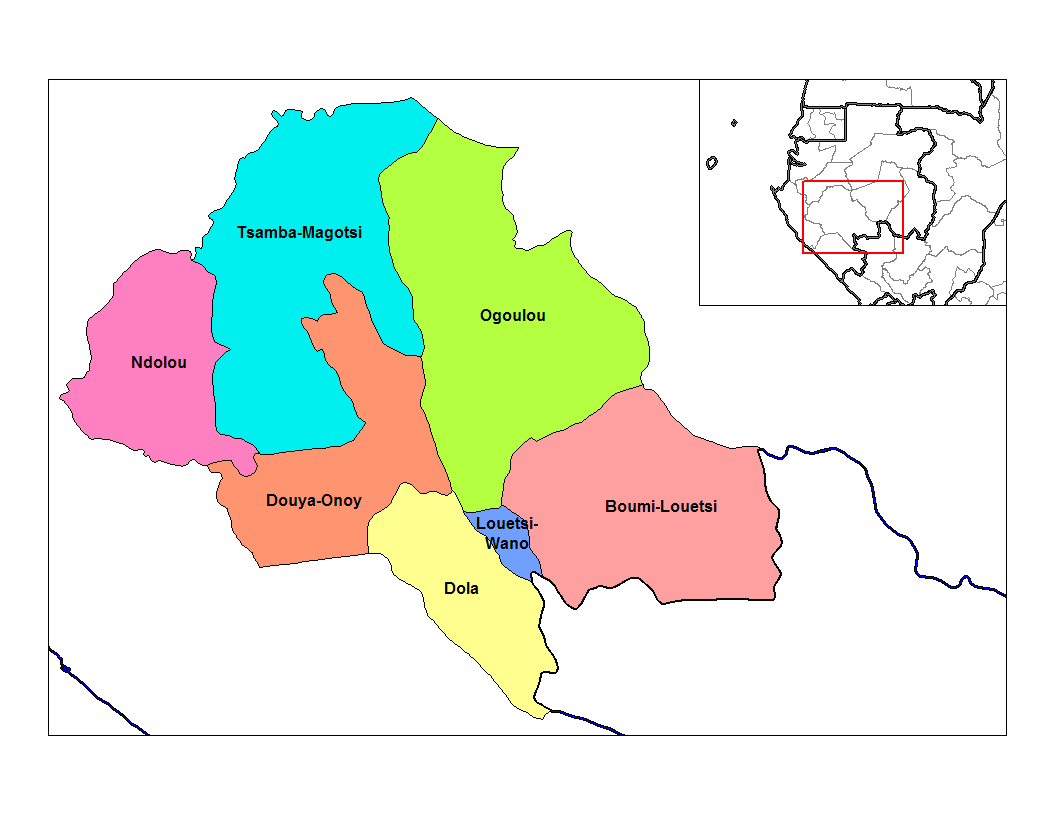
- Ndolou Department in the region
- Country: Gabon
- Province: Ngounié Province

Population (2013 Census)
  - Total: 5,727
- Time zone: UTC+1 (GMT +1)

Ndolou is a department of Ngounié Province in south-western Gabon. The capital lies at Mandji. It had a population of 5,727 in 2013.
