= Mongo (department) =

- Department
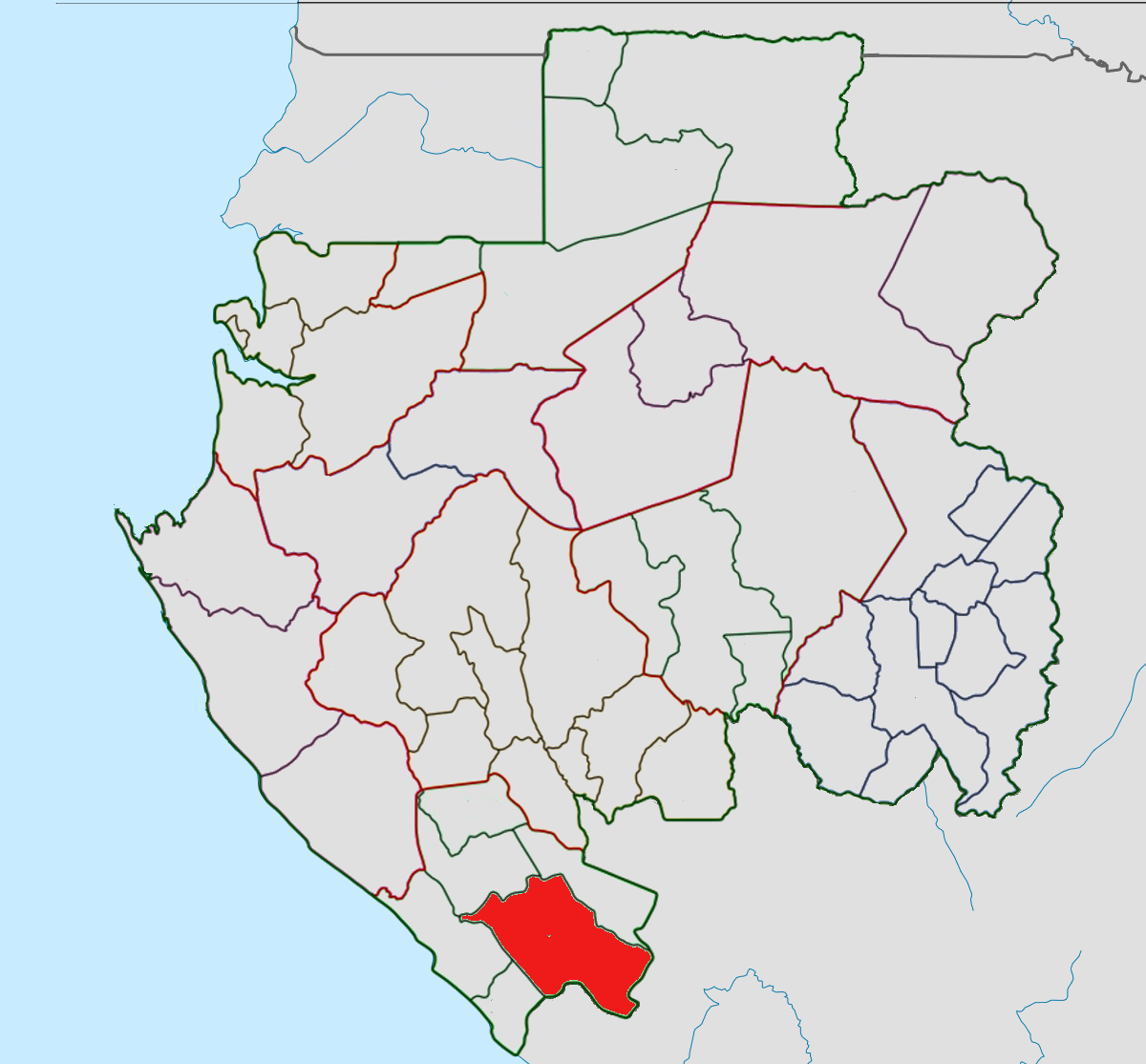
- Country: Gabon
- Province: Nyanga Province

Population (2013 Census)
  - Total: 2,602

Mongo is a department of Nyanga Province in Gabon. Its chief town is the city of Moulengui-Binza. It had a population of 2,602 in 2013.
