= Sebe-Brikolo (department) =

Coordinates: 0°41′S 13°47′E

- Department
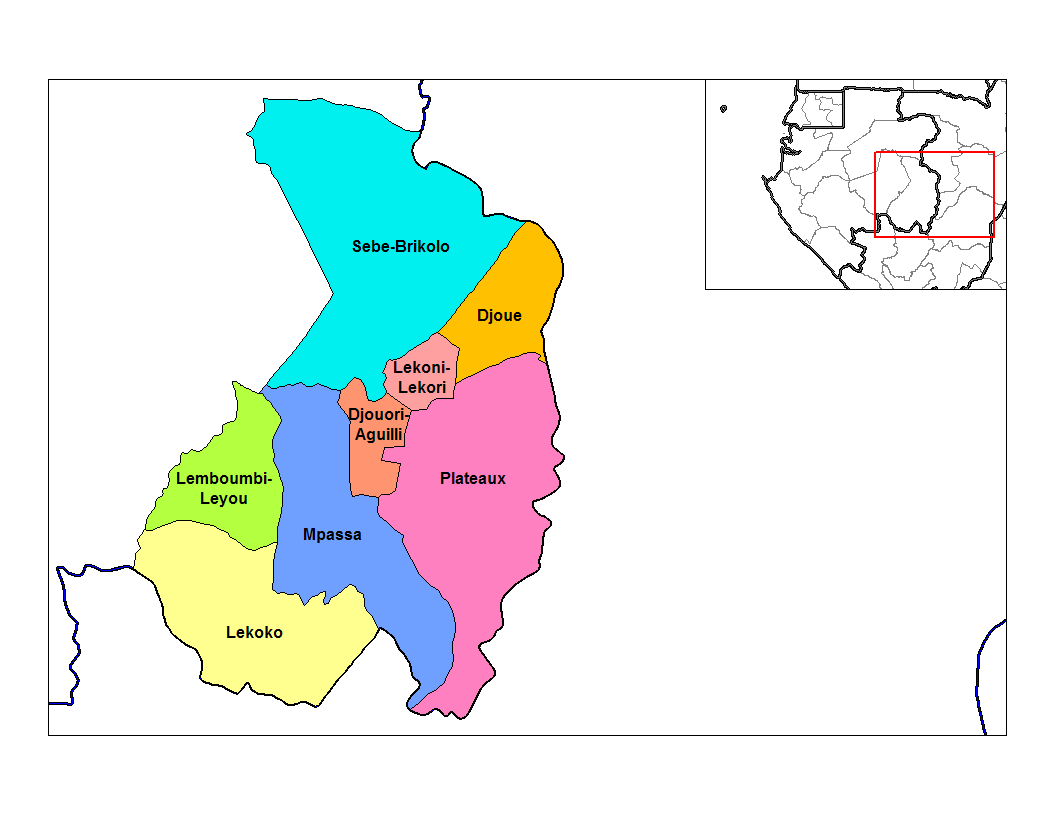
- Sebe-Brikolo Department in the region
- Country: Gabon
- Province: Haut-Ogooué Province

Population (2013 Census)
  - Total: 16,443
- Time zone: UTC+1 (GMT +1)

Sebe-Brikolo is a department of Haut-Ogooué Province in eastern Gabon. The capital lies at Okondja. It had a population of 16,443 in 2013.

== Towns and villages ==
Lekori, Ossélé, Opoungou, Mbounga, Okila, Ngoma, Ayanabo, Alagna, Odjala etc...
