= Bakoumba =

- Location in Gabon
- Coordinates: 1°49′46″S 13°1′14″E
- Country: Gabon
- Province: Haut-Ogooué Province
- Department: Lekoko Department

Population
  - Total: 3,000

Bakoumba is a town in south eastern Gabon with a population of around 2,500 - 3000 people. It lies southwest of Moanda and served as the headquarters of the COMILOG Cableway, which transported manganese from Moanda to Mbinda in the Republic of the Congo. The cableway closed in 1986.

The town is known for Lékédi Park, a nature reserve, fish farm and exotic animal farm.
