= Lekoni-Lekori (department) =

Coordinates: 1°10′11″S 13°52′36″E

- Department
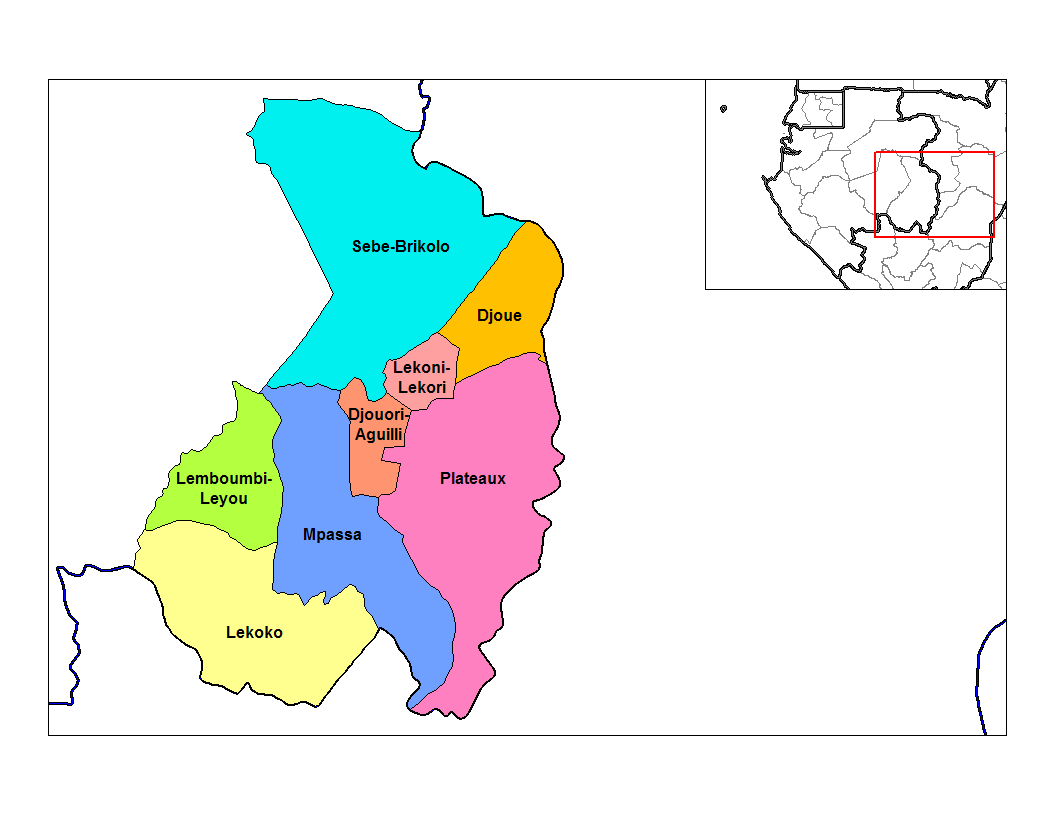
- Lekoni-Lekori Department in the region
- Country: Gabon
- Province: Haut-Ogooué Province

Population (2013 Census)
  - Total: 10,028
- Time zone: UTC+1 (GMT +1)

Lekoni-Lekori is a department of Haut-Ogooué Province in southeastern Gabon. Its capital is Akieni. It had a population of 10,028 in 2013.
