= Louetsi-Bibaka =

- Department
- Country: Gabon
- Province: Ngounié Province

Population (2013 Census)
  - Total: 2,734

Louetsi-Bibaka is a department of Ngounié Province in Gabon. It had a population of 2,734 in 2013.
