= Komo-Océan (department) =

- Department
- Country: Gabon

Population (2013 Census)
  - Total: 553

Komo-Océan is a department of Estuaire Province in Gabon. The population was 553 in 2013.

== Geography ==
At department, main towns:

- Océan Gongoué
- Remboué Gongoué.
