= Ogooué-Létili (department) =

- Department
- Country: Gabon
- Province: Haut-Ogooué Province

Population (2013 Census)
  - Total: 2,791

Ogooué-Létili is a department of Haut-Ogooué Province in Gabon. It had a population of 2,791 in 2013.
