= Haut-Komo (department) =

Coordinates: 0°59′40″N 10°47′22″E

- Department
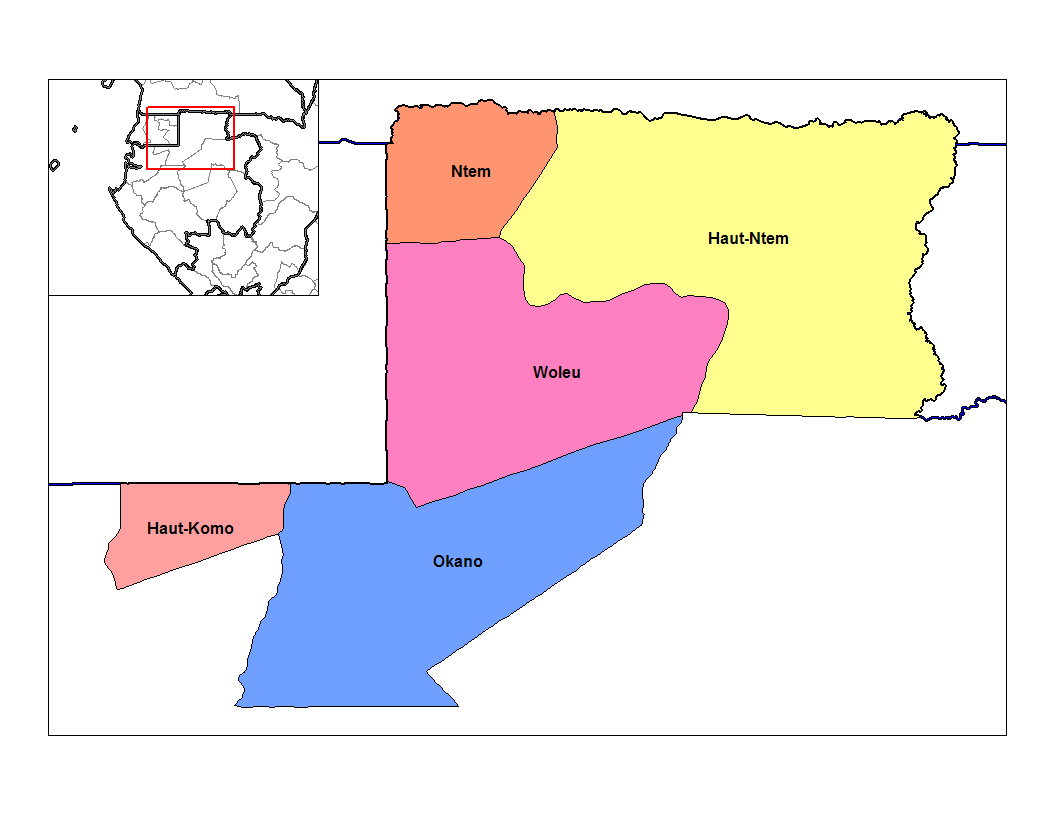
- Haut-Komo Department in the region
- Country: Gabon
- Province: Woleu-Ntem Province

Population (2013 Census)
  - Total: 3,403
- Time zone: UTC+1 (GMT +1)

Haut-Komo is a department of Woleu-Ntem Province in northern Gabon. The capital lies at Médouneu. The department borders with Equatorial Guinea. It had a population of 3,403 in 2013.
