= Médouneu =

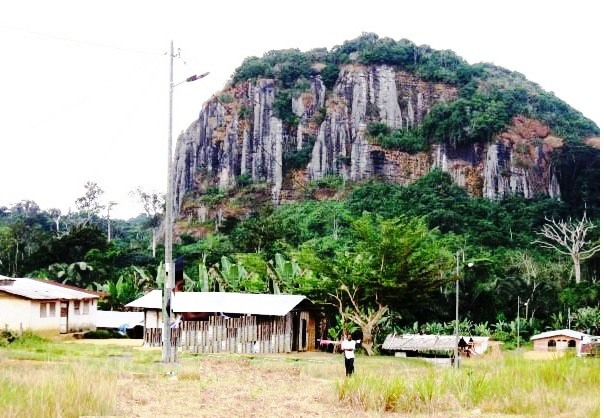

- Location in Gabon
- Coordinates: 1°01′N 10°47′E
- Country: Gabon
- Province: Woleu-Ntem
- Department: Haut-Ntem Department

Population (2009)
  - Total: 2,445
- Time zone: UTC+1 (WAT)

Médouneu is a small town in northern Gabon. It is the capital of the Haut-Komo Department in Woleu-Ntem province. As of 2009 it had an estimated population of 2,445.

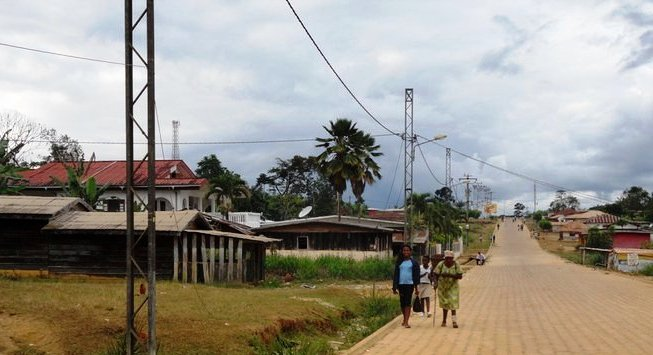
A road in Médouneu

The town is served by Médouneu Airport.

Although Médouneu lies entirely outside the de-jure boundaries of Gabon and inside the ones of Equatorial Guinea, the latter does not claim sovereignty over it in order to avoid a similar conflict around Ebibeyin, the third most populous city in Equatorial Guinea after Bata and Malabo, but which has a large part of its territory within the de-jure boundaries of Gabon.
