= Mpassa (department) =

Coordinates: 1°38′S 13°35′E

- Department
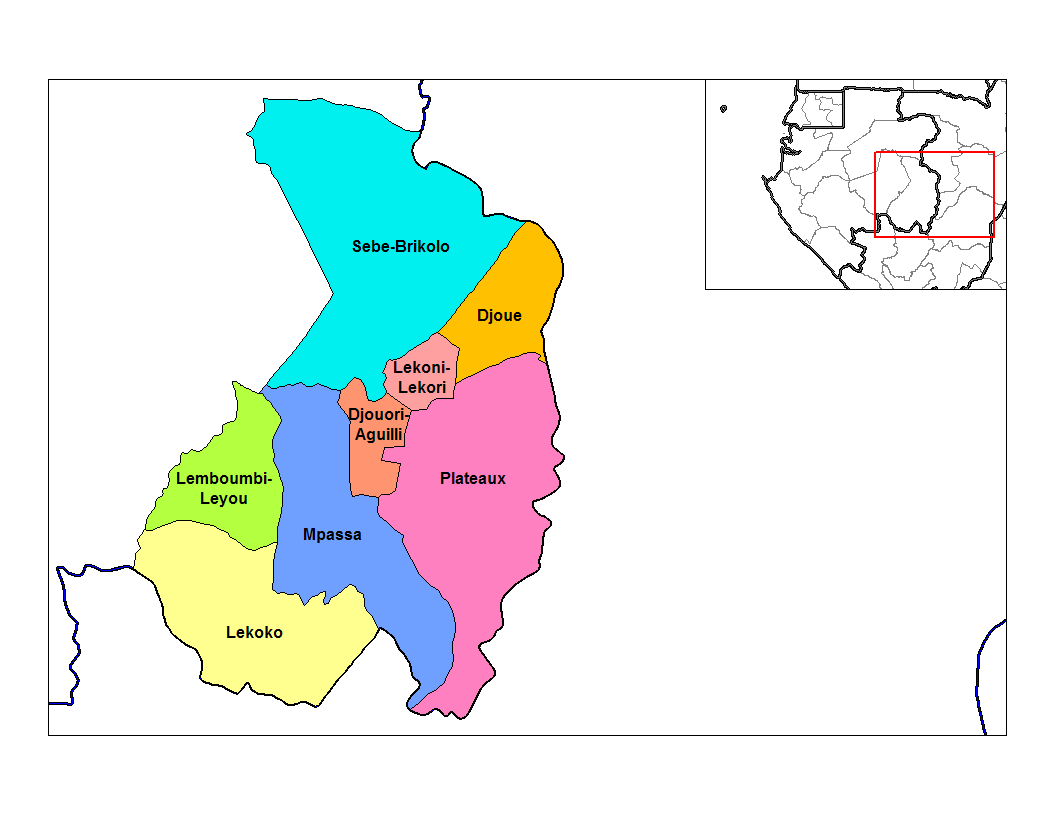
- Mpassa Department in the region
- Country: Gabon
- Province: Haut-Ogooué Province

Population (2013 Census)
  - Total: 129,694
- Time zone: UTC+1 (GMT +1)

Mpassa is a department of Haut-Ogooué Province in south-eastern Gabon. The capital is Franceville. It had a population of 129,694 in 2013.

== See also ==
- Central Africa
