= Woleu (department) =

Coordinates: 1°36′14″N 11°34′48″E

- Department
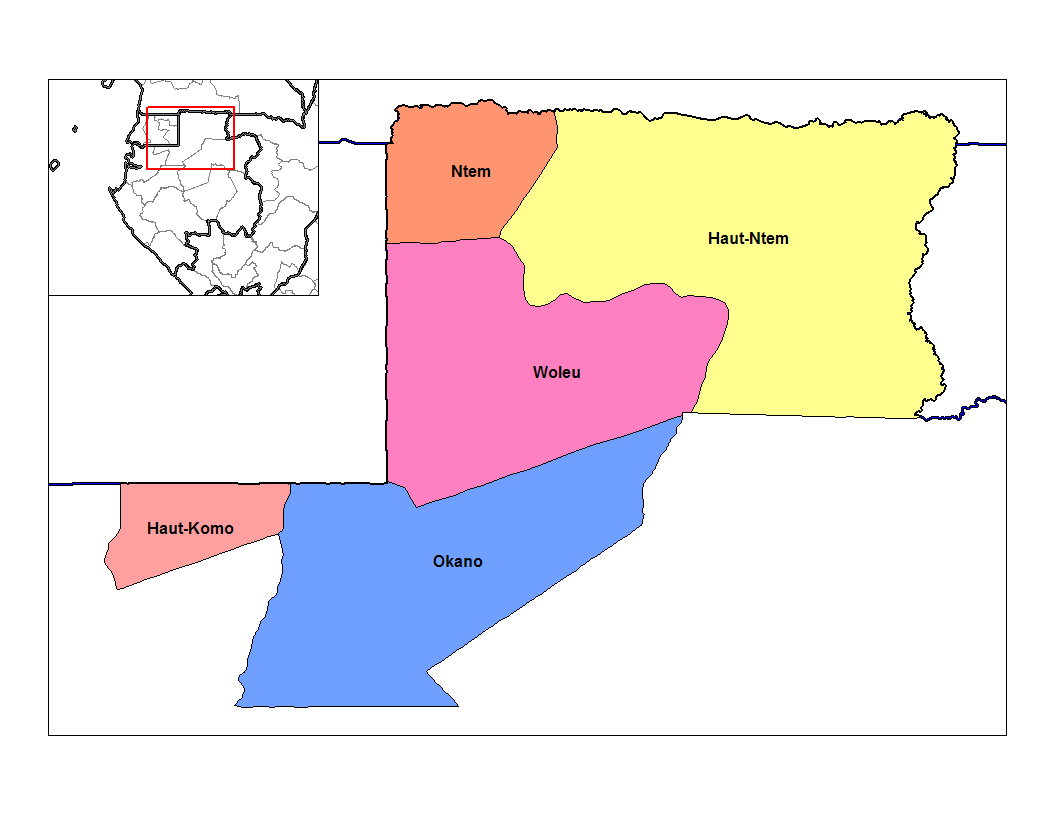
- Woleu Department in the region
- Country: Gabon
- Province: Woleu-Ntem Province

Population (2013 Census)
  - Total: 74,403
- Time zone: UTC+1 (GMT +1)

Woleu is a department of Woleu-Ntem Province in northern Gabon. The capital lies at Oyem. It borders Equatorial Guinea to the west. It had a population of 74,403 in 2013.
