= Mougoutsi (department) =

Coordinates: 2°51′04″S 11°01′26″E

- Department
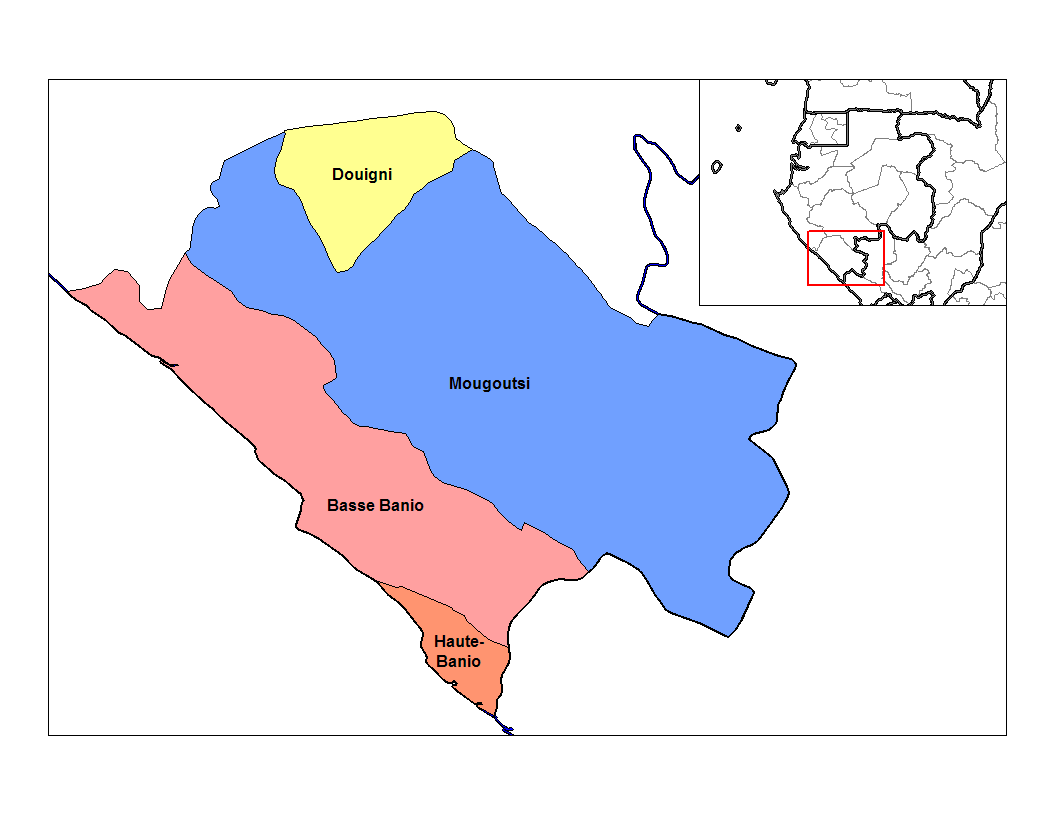
- Mougoutsi Department in the region
- Country: Gabon
- Province: Nyanga Province

Population (2013 Census)
  - Total: 31,789
- Time zone: UTC+1 (GMT +1)

Mougoutsi is a department of Nyanga Province in southern Gabon. The capital lies at Tchibanga. It had a population of 31,789 in 2013.
