= Okondja =

- Town
- Location in Gabon
- Coordinates: 0°39′7″S 13°40′40″E
- Country: Gabon
- Province: Haut-Ogooué
- Department: Sebe-Brikolo

Population (2013)
  - Total: 10,136
- Time zone: UTC+1 (WAT)

Okondja is a town in Haut-Ogooué province, eastern Gabon. It is the capital of the Sebe-Brikolo Department. According to the 1993 census it had a population of 5,193 and in 2013 it had an estimated population of 10,136 . It lies along National Route 15 and is served by Okondja Airport. There are significant manganese reserves in the area. There is an old cinema at Okandja named Sébé Cinema.

== Geography and geology ==
By road, Okondja is located 156 kilometres (97 mi) northeast of Franceville. It lies on the Sébé River and is located in the Sébé Valley. It lies along National Route 15 and is served by Okondja Airport.

Geologically it belongs to the Okondja Basin, a forested area with submarine "spilitic volcanism", which explains its significant manganese reserves. A Chinese-Brazilian consortium is keen on exploiting local reserves of manganese, and there is a known manganese ore mine about 15 kilometres (9.3 mi) to the east and numerous others in the area. By 2004, the Brazilians had shown an interest in exploiting at least two deposits in the Okondja area. A 2006 assessment of the area concluded that if exploited to its full potential, Gabon could become the leading exporter of manganese in the world, if the deposits at Franceville, Mbigou and Ndjolé are also exploited. Okondja is also said to have a high diversity of unusual cultivars and bananas and coffee are produced in the area.

== Demographics ==
The prefectures of Okondja and Franceville are home to the Obamba people, also known as the Mbamba, who speak a Mbede language. The Lendambomo language is said to be spoken in Okondja.
