= Plateaux (department), Gabon =

Plateaux
- Department
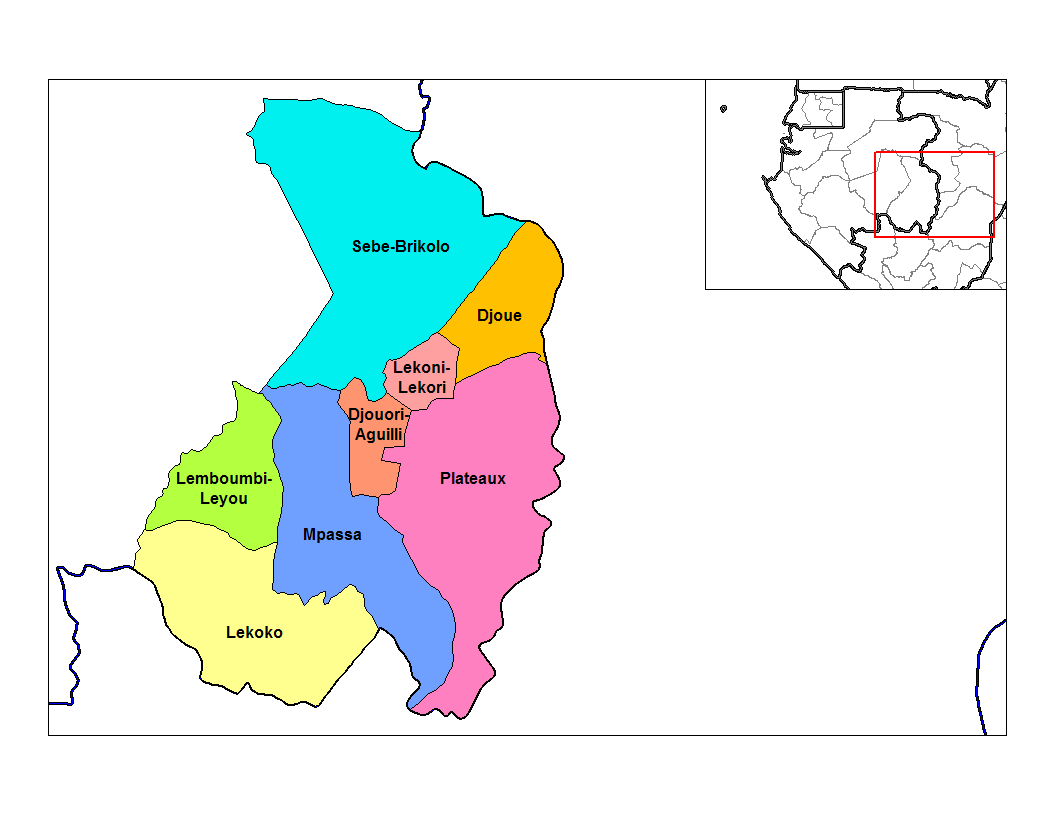
- Plateaux Department (Gabon) in the region
- Country: Gabon
- Province: Haut-Ogooué Province

Population (2013 Census)
  - Total: 9,054
- Time zone: UTC+01:00 (UTC+01:00)

Plateaux is a department of Haut-Ogooué Province in south-eastern Gabon. The capital lies at Lekoni. It had a population of 9,054 in 2013.
