= Bongoville =

Coordinates: 1°38′50″S 13°51′48″E

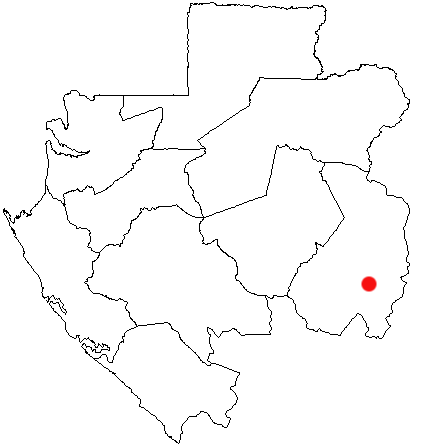
- Bongoville shown within Gabon
- Country: Gabon
- Province: Haut-Ogooué Province
- Department: Djououri-Aguilli Department

Bongoville is a town in southeastern Gabon, east of Franceville. It was known as Lewai until it was renamed for President Omar Bongo, who was born in what was then a village but was greatly enlarged under his presidency. It is just west of the Bateke Plateau and is home to Stade de Bongoville, a 2,500-capacity stadium where the city's AC Bongoville football club plays its home games.

== History ==
Bongoville was created in 1965 by grouping several villages together. In order to create Bongoville, the villages of Léwaye, Obia 2, Assiami, Ekala as well as those located along the Lekeï rivers namely Lekeï 1, Lekeï 2 and Lekeï 3 were grouped together. The pace of development of the village accelerated with the launch of the construction site of the R16 road to connect Franceville in Lékoni.
