= Lekoko (department) =

Coordinates: 1°49′48″S 13°01′17″E

- Department
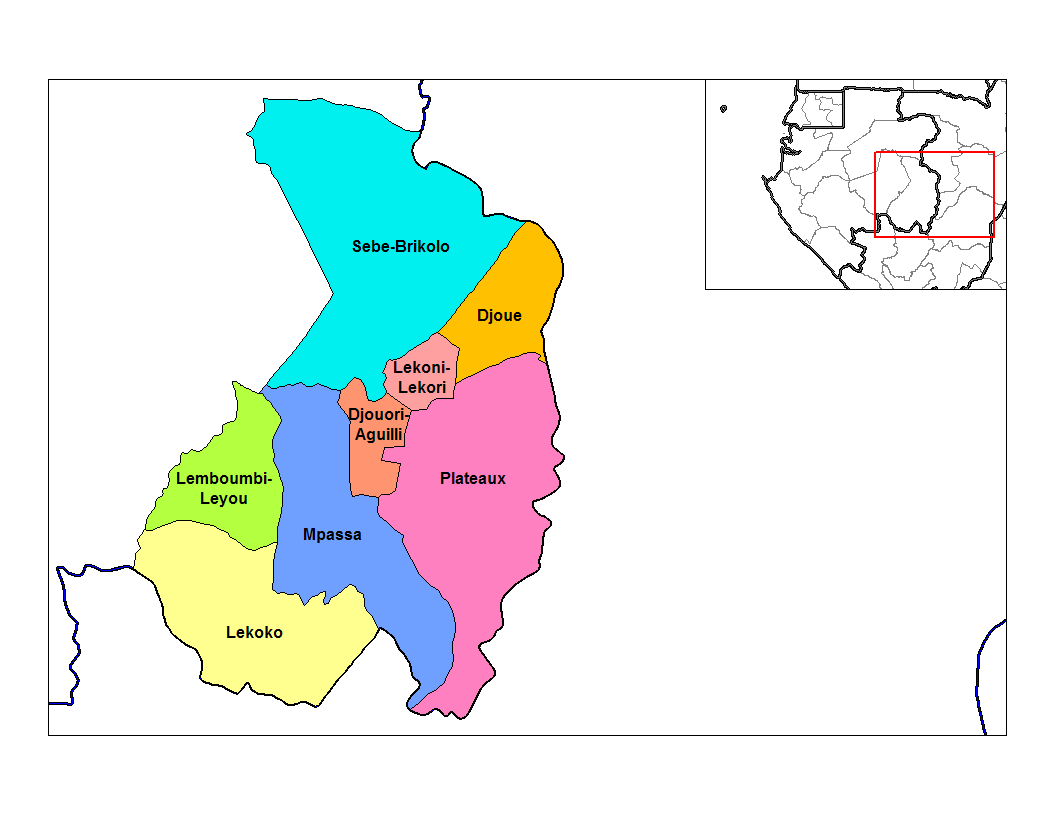
- Lekoko Department in the region
- Country: Gabon
- Province: Haut-Ogooué Province

Population (2013 Census)
  - Total: 4,920
- Time zone: UTC+1 (GMT +1)

Lekoko is a department of Haut-Ogooué Province in south-eastern Gabon. The capital lies at Bakoumba. It had a population of 4,920 in 2013. The president of Lekoko was .
