= Lolo-Bouenguidi (department) =

Coordinates: 1°08′06″S 12°27′43″E

- Department
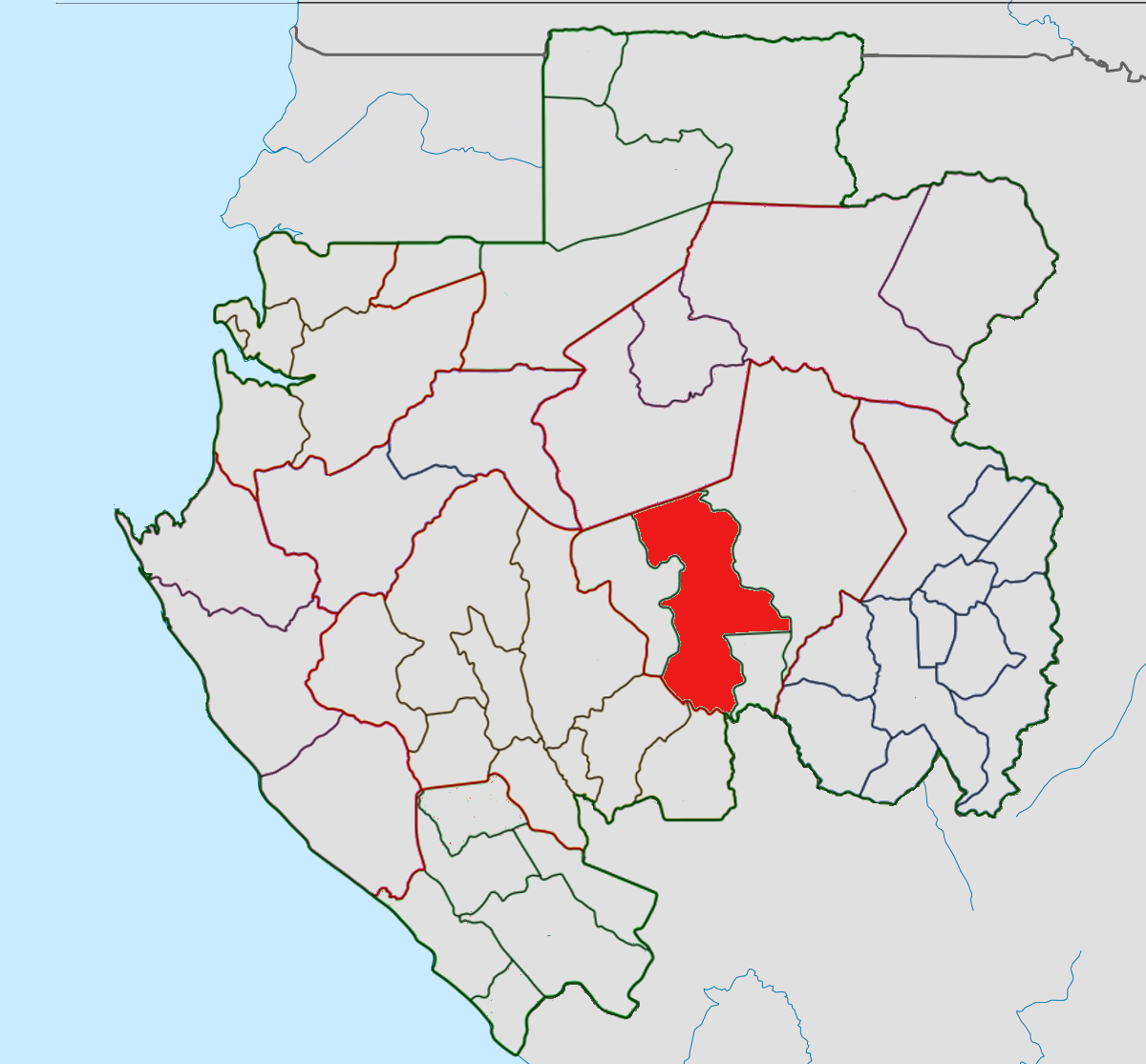
- Country: Gabon
- Province: Ogooué-Lolo Province

Population (2013 Census)
  - Total: 30,643
- Time zone: UTC+1 (GMT +1)

Lolo-Bouenguidi is a department of Ogooué-Lolo Province in central-eastern Gabon. The capital lies at Koulamoutou. It had a population of 30,643 in 2013.
