= Bendje (department) =

Coordinates: 0°43′S 8°47′E

- Department
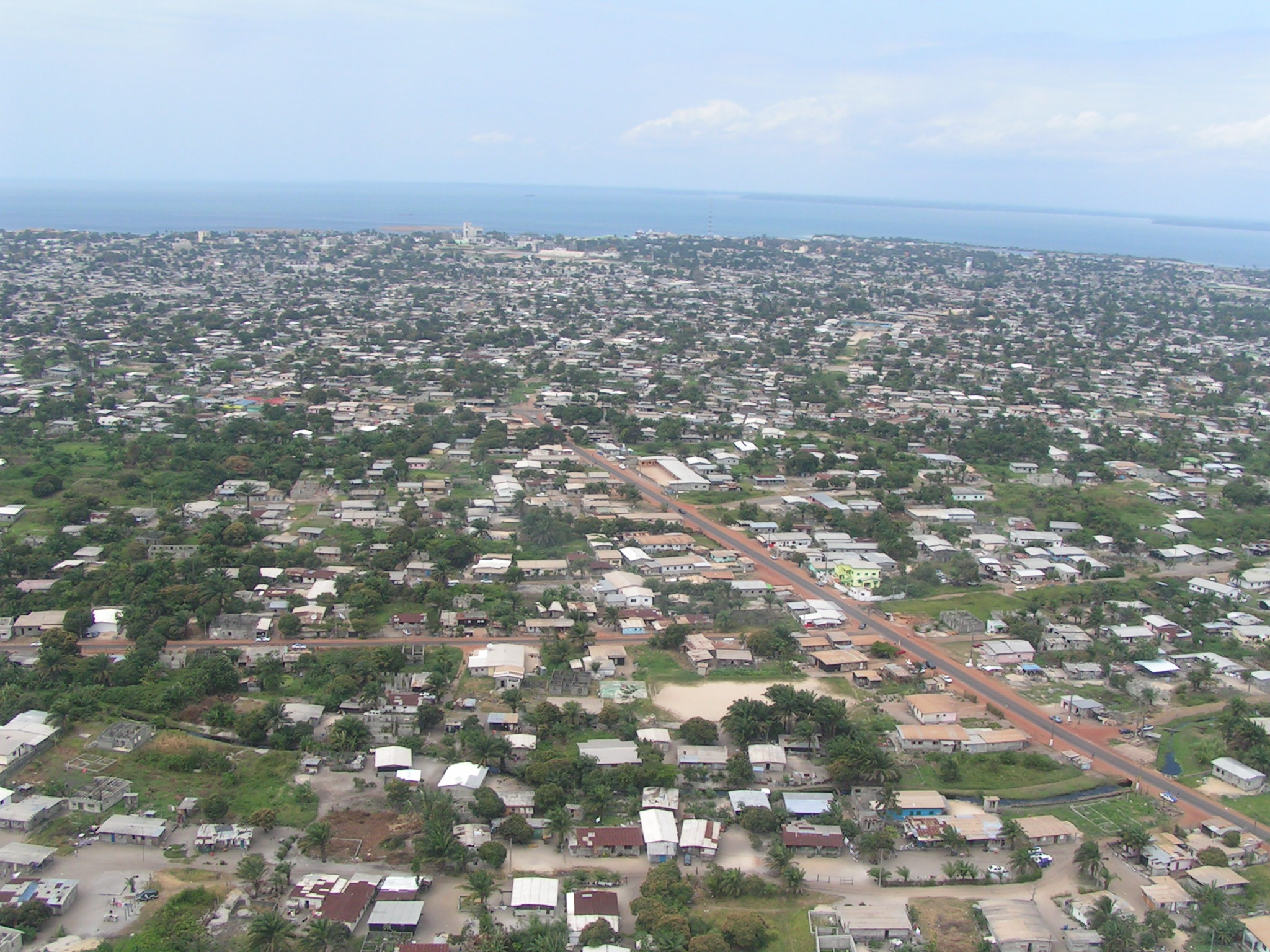
- Port-Gentil

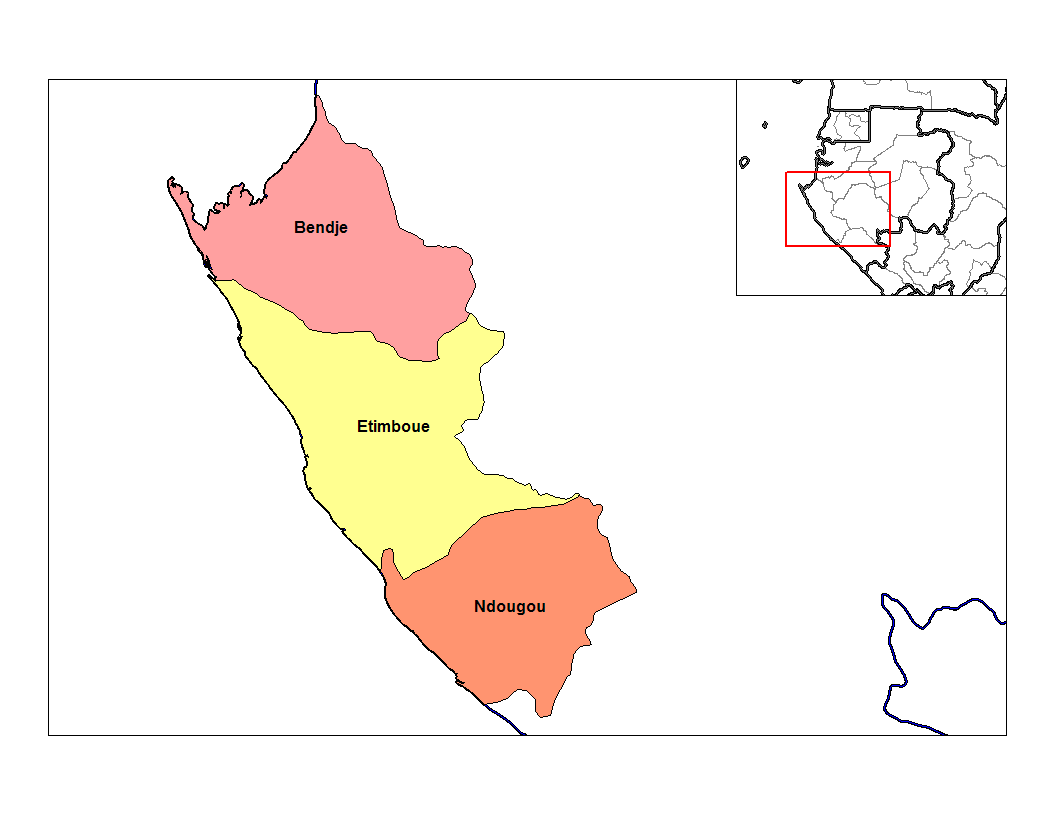
- Bendje Department in the region
- Country: Gabon
- Province: Ogooué-Maritime Province

Population (2013 Census)
  - Total: 140,747
- Time zone: UTC+1 (GMT +1)

Bendje is a department of Ogooué-Maritime Province in western Gabon. The capital lies at Port-Gentil. It had a population of 140,747 in 2013.

== Towns and villages ==
Port Gentil
