= Ndougou (department) =

Coordinates: 2°43′30″S 10°1′0″E

- Department
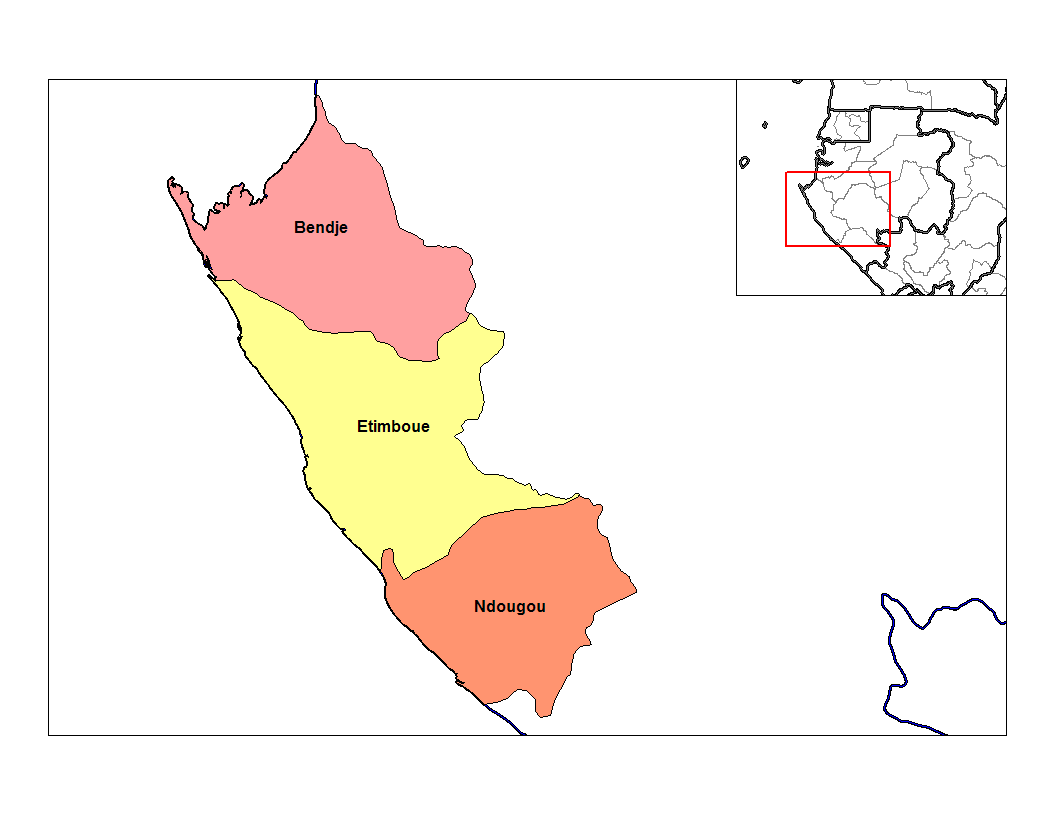
- Ndougou Department in the region
- Country: Gabon
- Province: Ogooué-Maritime Province

Population (2013 Census)
  - Total: 11,092
- Time zone: UTC+1 (GMT +1)

Ndougou is a department of Ogooué-Maritime Province in western Gabon. The capital lies at Gamba. It had a population of 11,092 in 2013.
