= Makokou =

City in Ogooué-Ivindo Province, Gabon

- Coat of arms

- Location in Gabon
- Coordinates: 0°34′N 12°52′E
- Country: Gabon
- Province: Ogooué-Ivindo Province
- Department: Ivindo

Government
  - Mayor: Andre Nkoghe Ella
- Elevation: 1,010 ft (308 m)

Population (2006)
  - Total: 13,881

Makokou is the regional capital of the Ogooué-Ivindo Province of Gabon.

The city lies on the Ivindo River and the N4 road, and it is near Ivindo National Park. It developed around iron ore mining.

== Transport ==
A branch of the Trans-Gabon Railway was originally planned to terminate in the town, but the route was eventually abandoned. The town has one airport, Makokou Airport.

== Religion ==
Its Cathédrale Notre-Dame des Victoires is the see of the Apostolic Vicariate of Makokou.

== Notable citizens ==
Former Gabonese prime ministers Emmanuel Issoze-Ngondet and Alain Claude Bilie By Nze were born in Makokou.

== Climate ==
Makokou has a tropical dry savanna climate (Köppen climate classification As).

Climate data for Makokou (1961–1990, extremes 1949–present)
Month	Jan	Feb	Mar	Apr	May	Jun	Jul	Aug	Sep	Oct	Nov	Dec	Year
Record high °C (°F)	34.0 (93.2)	41.5 (106.7)	37.0 (98.6)	39.5 (103.1)	41.1 (106.0)	37.3 (99.1)	32.5 (90.5)	33.0 (91.4)	35.4 (95.7)	37.2 (99.0)	36.0 (96.8)	33.5 (92.3)	41.5 (106.7)
Mean daily maximum °C (°F)	29.2 (84.6)	30.1 (86.2)	30.5 (86.9)	30.5 (86.9)	29.8 (85.6)	27.7 (81.9)	25.8 (78.4)	26.6 (79.9)	28.7 (83.7)	29.2 (84.6)	28.7 (83.7)	27.6 (81.7)	28.7 (83.7)
Daily mean °C (°F)	24.4 (75.9)	24.9 (76.8)	25.2 (77.4)	25.3 (77.5)	24.8 (76.6)	23.4 (74.1)	22.2 (72.0)	22.5 (72.5)	24.0 (75.2)	24.4 (75.9)	24.1 (75.4)	23.5 (74.3)	24.1 (75.4)
Mean daily minimum °C (°F)	19.5 (67.1)	19.7 (67.5)	19.8 (67.6)	20.0 (68.0)	19.8 (67.6)	19.0 (66.2)	18.6 (65.5)	18.4 (65.1)	19.2 (66.6)	19.5 (67.1)	19.5 (67.1)	19.3 (66.7)	19.4 (66.9)
Record low °C (°F)	15.9 (60.6)	15.0 (59.0)	16.3 (61.3)	16.6 (61.9)	16.8 (62.2)	14.2 (57.6)	11.5 (52.7)	13.0 (55.4)	13.5 (56.3)	15.0 (59.0)	17.0 (62.6)	15.2 (59.4)	11.5 (52.7)
Average precipitation mm (inches)	88.1 (3.47)	106.9 (4.21)	190.0 (7.48)	206.7 (8.14)	187.7 (7.39)	54.1 (2.13)	9.0 (0.35)	29.3 (1.15)	142.9 (5.63)	297.3 (11.70)	225.7 (8.89)	103.3 (4.07)	1,641 (64.61)
Average precipitation days	7.3	8.9	13.7	14.7	15.4	6.5	2.6	3.6	11.2	20.9	17.9	8.8	131.5
Average relative humidity (%)	82	79	79	79	80	83	85	83	80	80	81	83	81
Mean monthly sunshine hours	131.6	137.4	158.2	160.5	150.4	101.5	60.9	58.1	95.5	134.1	132.3	122.8	1,443.3
Source 1: NOAA
Source 2: Meteo Climat (record highs and lows)

== See also ==
- Transport in Gabon
- Railway stations in Gabon
