= Lemboumbi-Leyou (department) =

Coordinates: 1°34′S 13°12′E

- Department
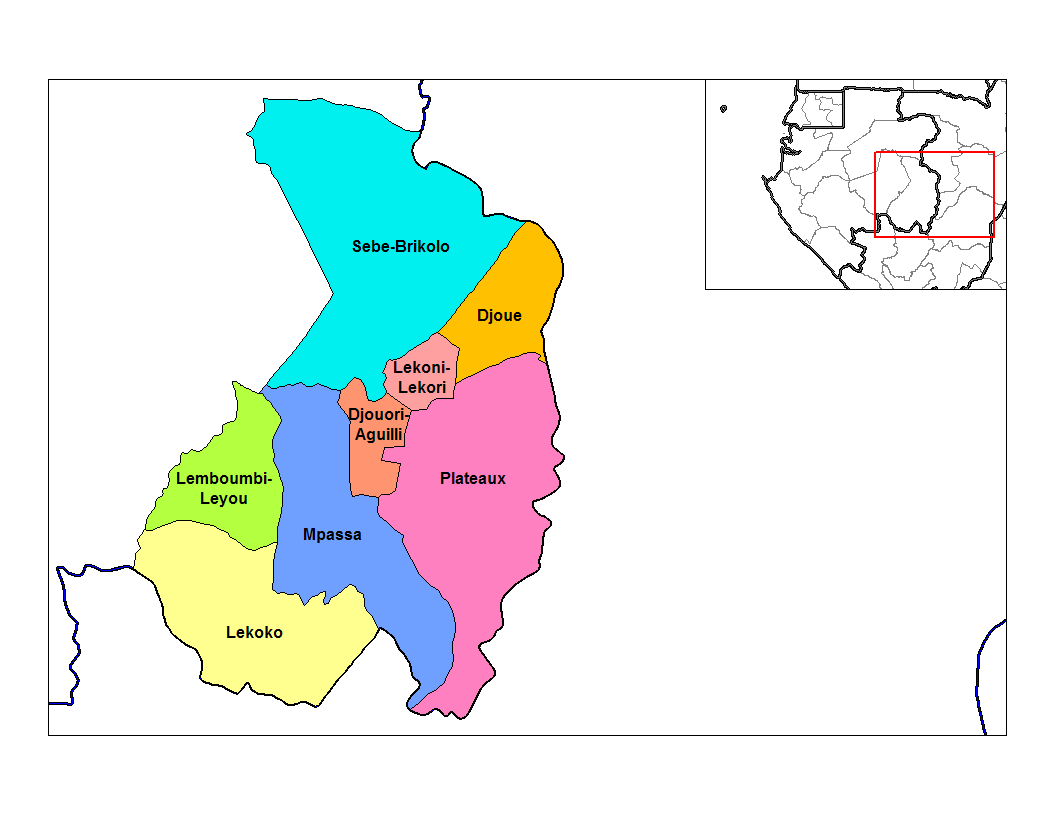
- Lemboumbi-Leyou Department in the region
- Country: Gabon
- Province: Haut-Ogooué Province

Population (2013 Census)
  - Total: 64,569
- Time zone: UTC+1 (GMT +1)

Lemboumbi-Leyou is a department of Haut-Ogooué Province in south-eastern Gabon. The capital lies at Moanda. It had a population of 64,569 in 2013.

== Towns and villages ==
• Moanda
