= Mvoung (department) =

Coordinates: 0°52′04″N 12°57′00″E

- Department
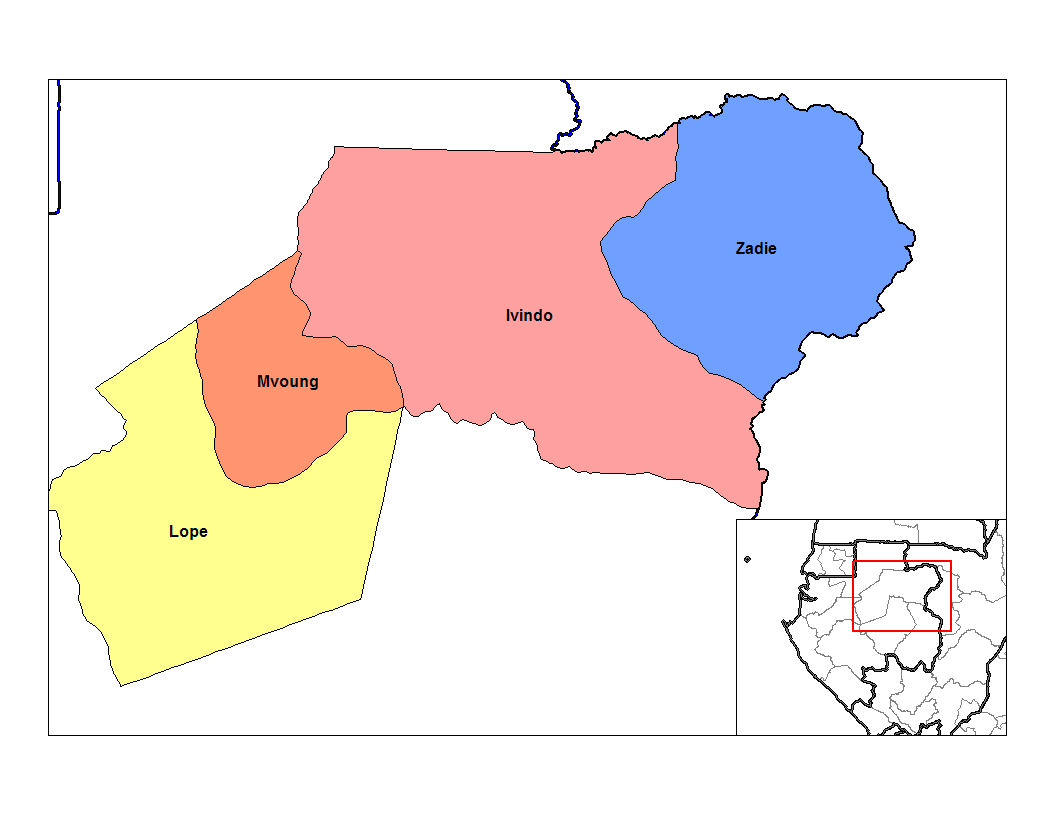
- Mvoung Department in the region
- Country: Gabon
- Province: Ogooué-Ivindo Province

Population (2013 Census)
  - Total: 4,022
- Time zone: UTC+1 (GMT +1)

Mvoung is a department of Ogooué-Ivindo Province in northern-central Gabon. The capital lies at Ovan. It had a population of 4,022 in 2013.
