= Ivindo (department) =

Coordinates: 0°33′50″N 12°50′42″E

- Department
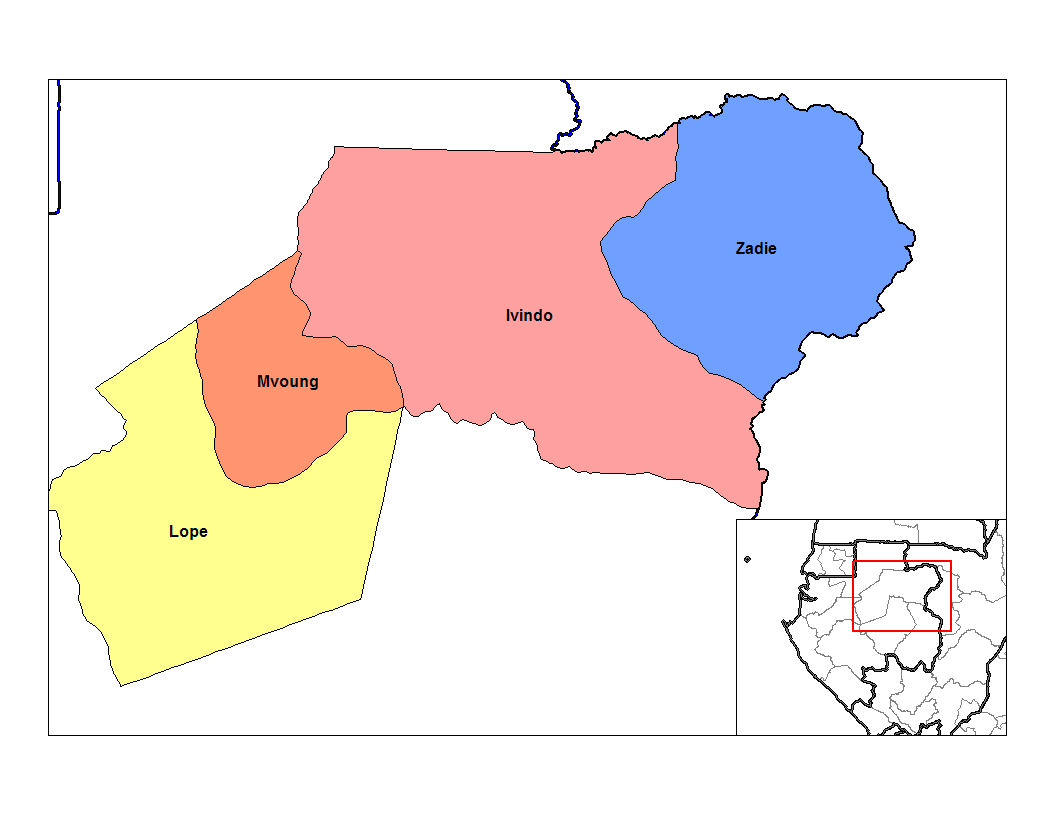
- Ivindo Department in the region
- Country: Gabon
- Province: Ogooué-Ivindo Province

Population (2013 Census)
  - Total: 31,073
- Time zone: UTC+1 (GMT +1)

Ivindo is a department of Ogooué-Ivindo Province in northern-central Gabon. Its capital is also the province's capital, Makokou. It had a population of 31,073 in 2013.
