= Estuaire Province =

Province of Gabon

Estuaire
- Province
- Estuaire
- Flag Coat of arms

- Estuaire Province in Gabon
- Coordinates: 0°23′40″N 9°25′45″E
- Country: Gabon
- Capital: Akanda
- Largest city: Libreville

Area
  - Total: 20,740 km^{2} (8,010 sq mi)

Population (2013 census)
  - Total: 895,689
  - Density: 43.19/km^{2} (111.9/sq mi)
- HDI (2017): 0.709 high

Estuaire is the most populous of Gabon's nine provinces. It covers an area of 20,740 km^{2}. The provincial capital is Akanda, but the largest city is Libreville, Gabon's national capital. The province is named for the Gabon Estuary, which lies at the heart of the province.

Estuaire is at the northwestern corner of Gabon, its western edge as the shores of the Gulf of Guinea. To the north, Estuaire borders the Republic of Equatorial Guinea: the Litoral Province in the northwest, and the Centro Sur Province in the northeast. Domestically, it borders the following provinces:

- Woleu-Ntem – east
- Moyen-Ogooué – south-southeast
- Ogooué-Maritime – southwest

== Departments ==
Estuaire is divided into 5 departments:

- Komo Department (Kango)
- Komo-Mondah Department (Ntoum)
- Noya Department (Cocobeach)
- Komo-Océan Department (Ndzomoe)
- Libreville ( Gabon's capital )
