= Ogooué-Maritime Province =

Province of Gabon

Ogooué-Maritime
- Province
- Flag Coat of arms

- Ogooué-Maritime Province in Gabon
- Coordinates: 1°30′S 9°30′E
- Country: Gabon
- Capital: Port-Gentil

Area
  - Total: 22,890 km^{2} (8,840 sq mi)

Population (2013 census)
  - Total: 157,562
  - Density: 6.883/km^{2} (17.83/sq mi)
- HDI (2017): 0.702 high

Ogooué-Maritime is the westernmost of Gabon's nine provinces. It covers an area of 22,890 km^{2}. The provincial capital is Port-Gentil. It has a 2013 census population of 157,562.

The shores of Ogooué-Maritime are of the Gulf of Guinea to the northwest and the South Atlantic Ocean to the southwest. It is the only coastal province without a foreign border. On land, it borders the following provinces:

- Estuaire – north
- Moyen-Ogooué – northeast
- Ngounié – east
- Nyanga – southeast

== Departments ==
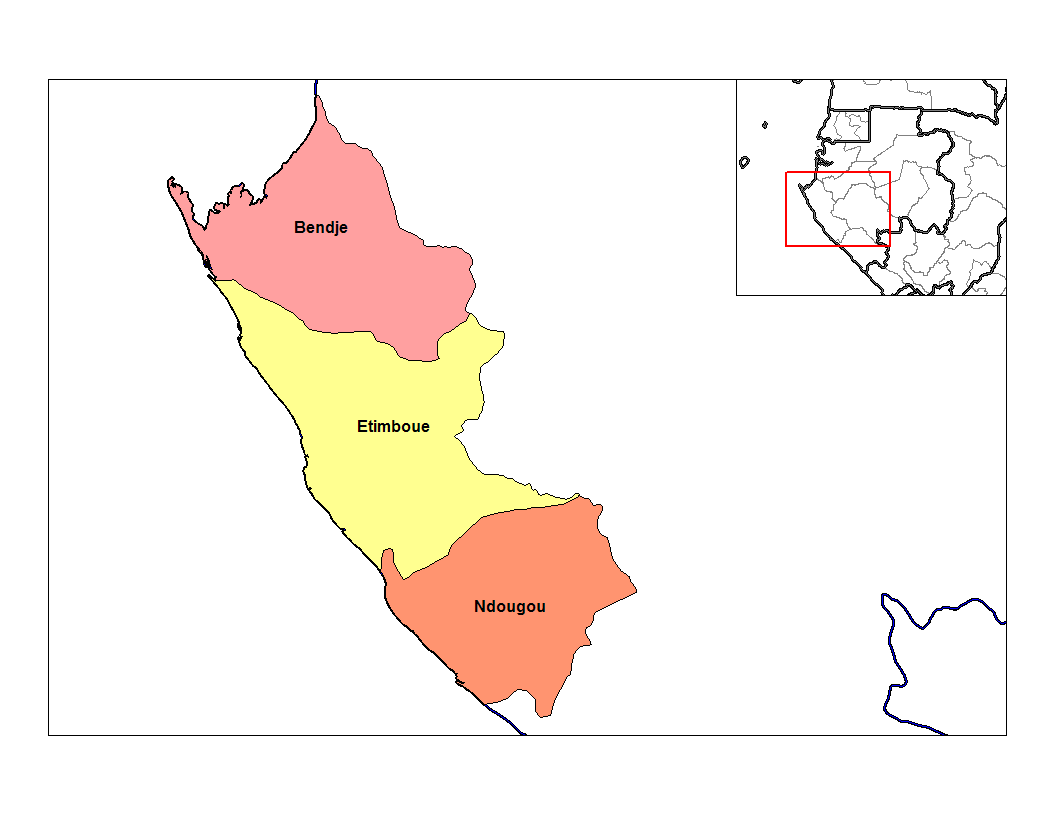
Departments of Ogooué-Maritime

Ogooué-Maritime is divided into 3 departments:

- Bendje Department (Port-Gentil)
- Etimboue Department (Omboue)
- Ndougou Department (Gamba)

== Economy ==
- Rabi Kounga oil field
