= Moyen-Ogooué Province =

Province of Gabon

Moyen-Ogooué
- Province
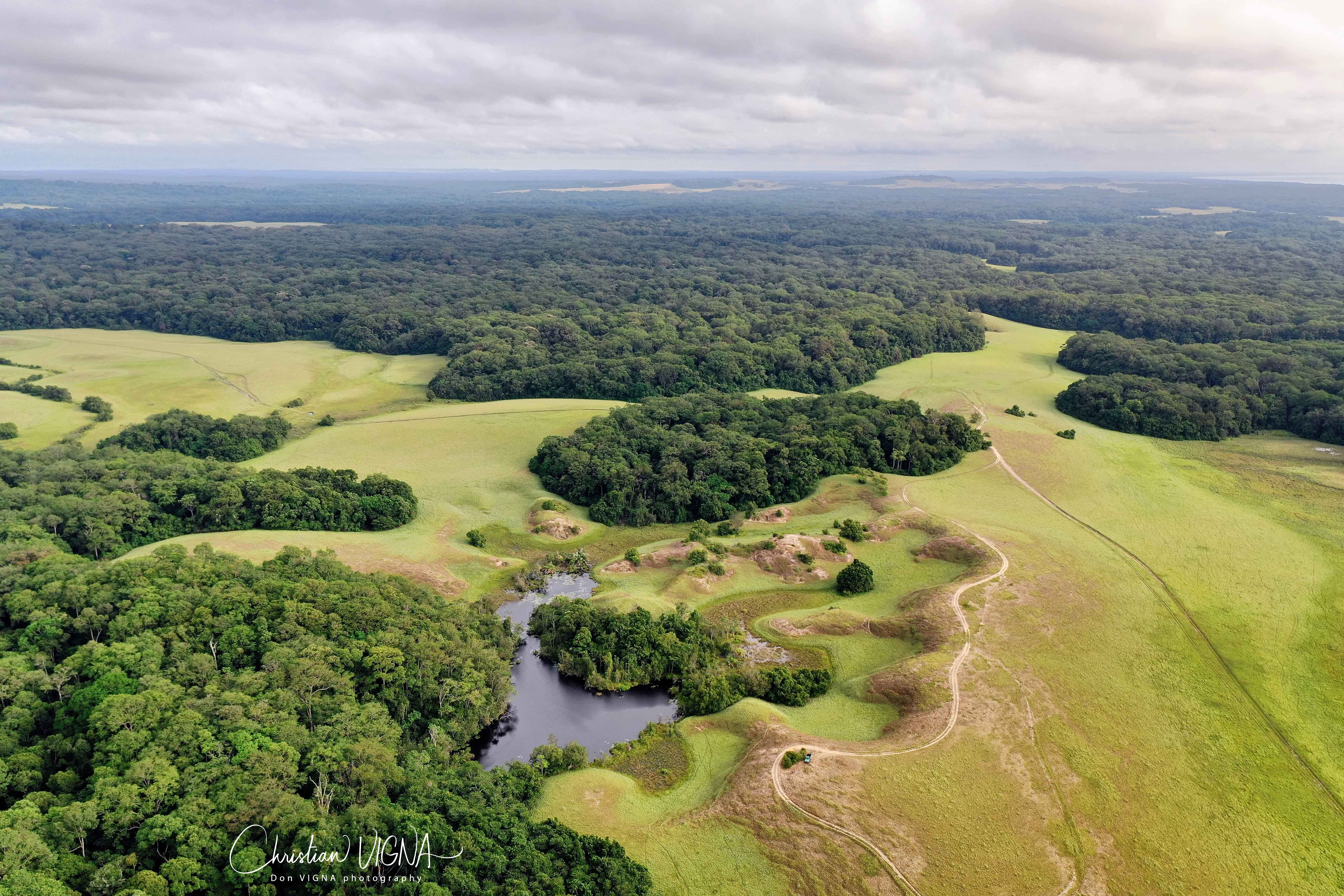

- Flag Coat of arms

- Moyen-Ogooué Province in Gabon
- Coordinates: 0°30′S 10°30′E
- Country: Gabon
- Capital: Lambaréné

Area
  - Total: 18,535 km^{2} (7,156 sq mi)

Population (2013 census)
  - Total: 69,287
  - Density: 3.7382/km^{2} (9.6818/sq mi)
- HDI (2017): 0.703 high

Moyen-Ogooué is one of Gabon's nine provinces. It covers an area of 18,535 km^{2} (7,156 sq mi). The provincial capital is Lambaréné. As of 2013, 69,287 people lived there.

Unlike any other province of Gabon, Moyen-Ogooué has neither seacoast nor a foreign border. It borders the following provinces:

- Estuaire Province – northwest
- Woleu-Ntem Province – north-northeast
- Ogooué-Ivindo Province – east
- Ogooué-Lolo Province – southeast, at a quadripoint
- Ngounié Province – south
- Ogooué-Maritime Province – west-southwest

Moyen-Ogooué borders all but two of the rest of Gabon's provinces, thus more than any other province.

== Departments ==
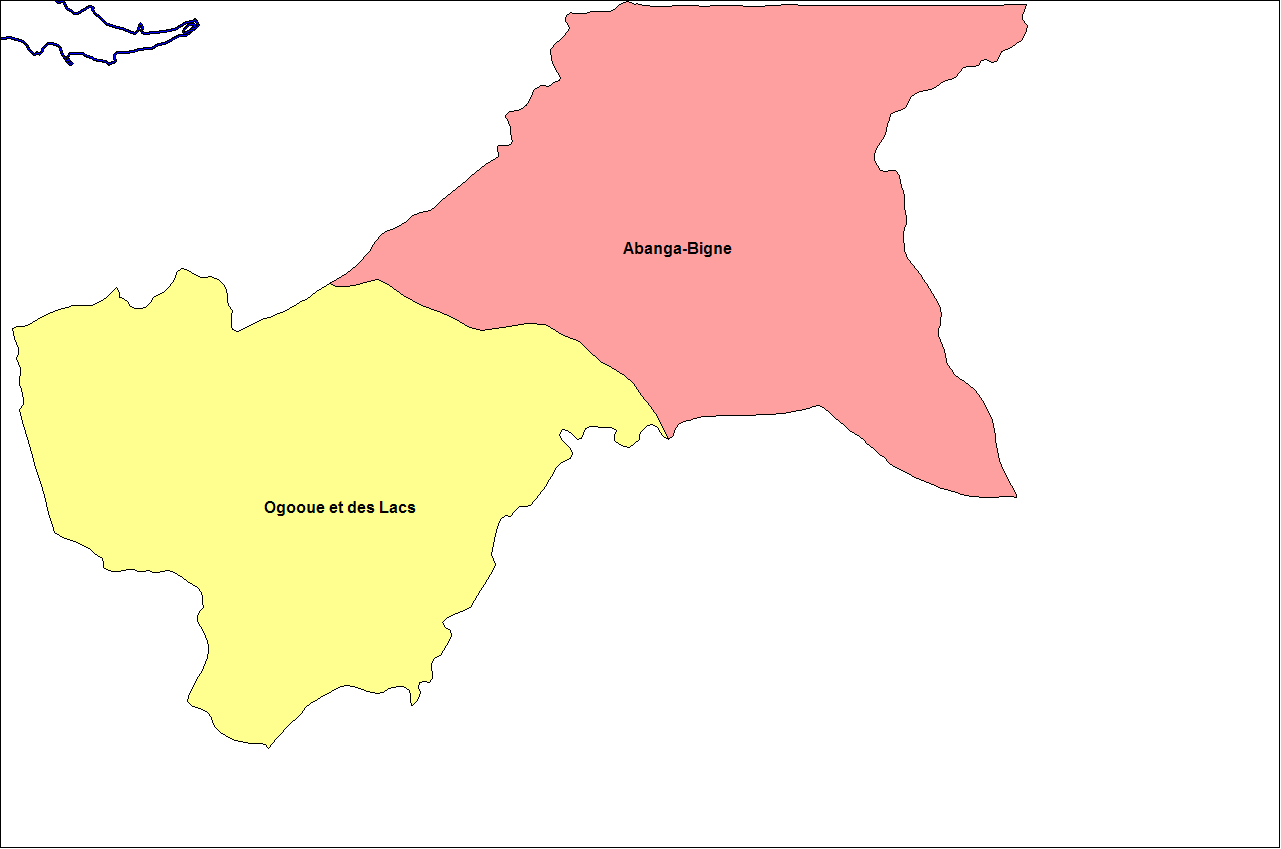
Departments of Moyen-Ogooué

Moyen-Ogooué is divided into 2 departments:

- Abanga-Bigne Department (capital Ndjolé)
- Ogooué et des Lacs Department (capital Lambaréné)
