= Woleu-Ntem Province =

Province of Gabon

Woleu-Ntem
- Province
- Flag Coat of arms

- Woleu-Ntem Province in Gabon
- Coordinates: 1°17′36″N 11°50′8″E
- Country: Gabon
- Capital: Oyem

Area
  - Total: 38,465 km^{2} (14,851 sq mi)

Population (2013 census)
  - Total: 154,986
  - Density: 4.0293/km^{2} (10.436/sq mi)
- HDI (2017): 0.641 medium

Woleu-Ntem is the northernmost of Gabon's nine provinces. It covers an area of 38,465 km^{2} and named after Woleu and Ntem rivers that cross it. The provincial capital is Oyem, which had a total of 60,685 inhabitants in 2013.

As Woleu-Ntem is the most northerly province of Gabon, it is the only province that borders Cameroon, and the only one with multiple foreign borders (other two being the Republics of the Congo and of Equatorial Guinea). It borders the following areas of these countries:

- Sangha Department, Republic of the Congo – east
- South Province, Cameroon – north
- Kié-Ntem Province, Equatorial Guinea – northwest, north of Wele-Nzas
- Wele-Nzas Province, Equatorial Guinea – northwest, east of Centro Sur and south of Kié-Ntem
- Centro Sur Province, Equatorial Guinea – northwest, west of Wele-Nzas

Domestically, it borders the following provinces:

- Estuaire – southwest
- Moyen-Ogooué – south
- Ogooué-Ivindo – southeast

== Departments ==
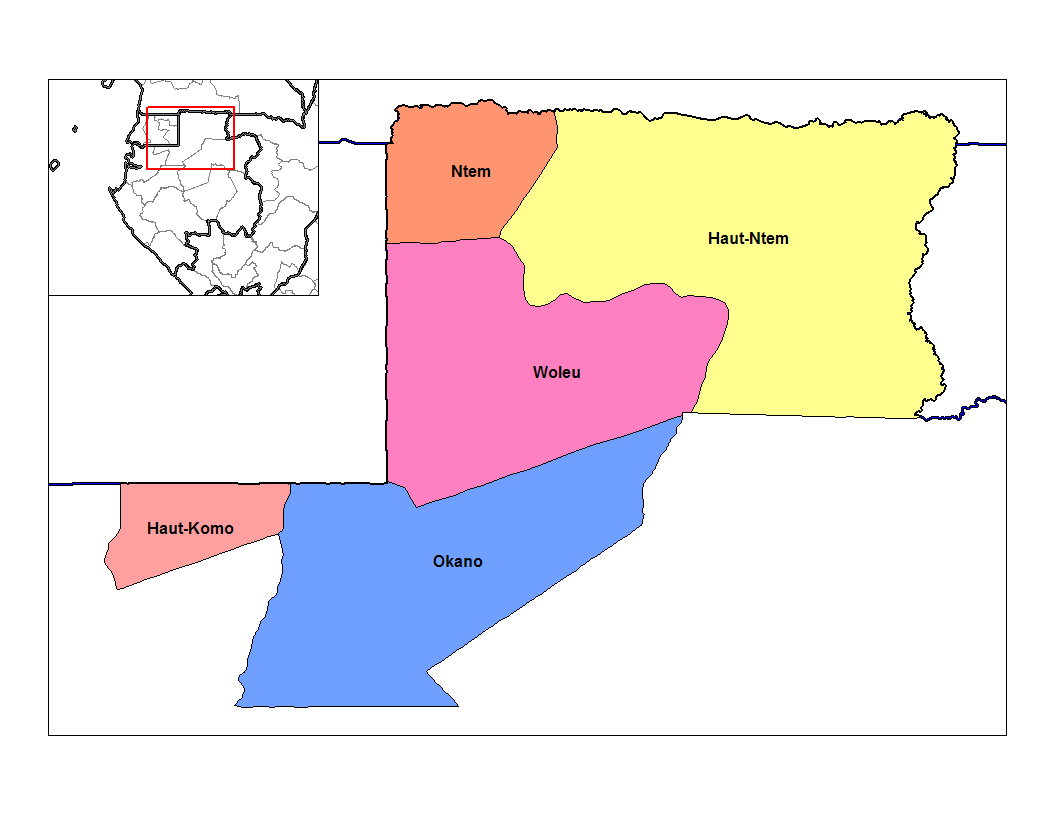
Departments of Woleu-Ntem

Woleu-Ntem is divided into 5 departments:

- Haut-Komo (department) (Médouneu)
- Haut-Ntem (department) (Minvoul)
- Ntem (department) (Bitam)
- Okano (department) (Mitzic)
- Woleu (department) (Oyem)

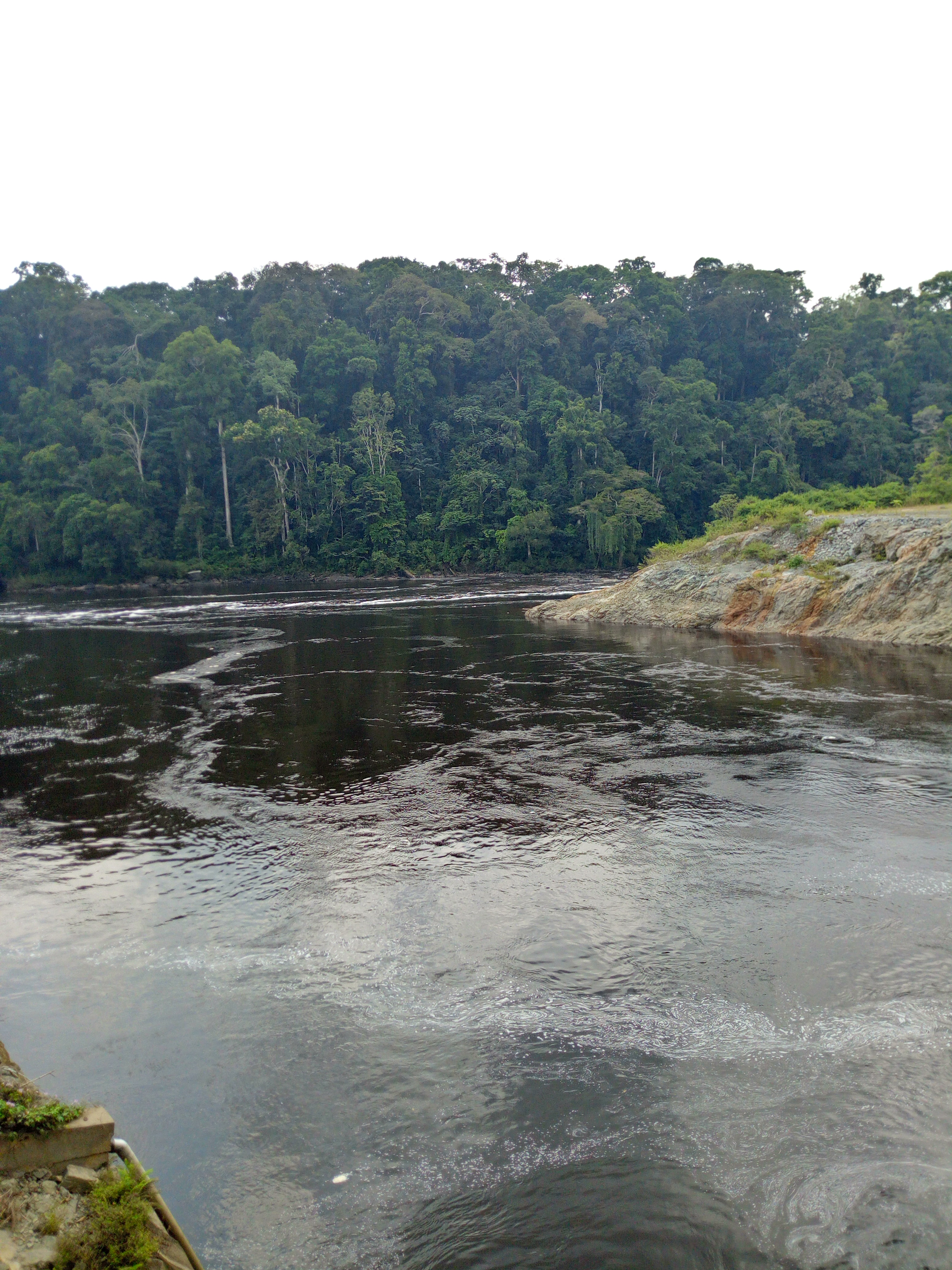
Ntem river, Cameroon South Region (tropical forest)

== Sources ==
- The World Factbook
- https://www.amazinggabon.com/en/woleu-ntem-province/
- https://www.citypopulation.de/php/gabon-admin.php?adm1id=9
- https://www.fotw.info/flags/ga-wn.html
