= Ogooué-Lolo Province =

Province of Gabon

Ogooué-Lolo
- Province
- Flag Coat of arms

- Ogooué-Lolo Province in Gabon
- Coordinates: 1°0′S 12°30′E
- Country: Gabon
- Capital: Koulamoutou

Area
  - Total: 25,380 km^{2} (9,800 sq mi)

Population (2013 census)
  - Total: 65,771
  - Density: 2.591/km^{2} (6.712/sq mi)
- HDI (2017): 0.633 medium

The Ogooué-Lolo Province is one of the nine provinces of Gabon, slightly southeast of central Gabon. The regional capital is Koulamoutou, a city of approximately 16,000 people. It is the ninth largest city in Gabon and the home of slightly more than one-third of the provincial population.

- Area: 25,380 km²
- 2-letter abbreviation/HASC: GA-OL
- ISO 3166-2: GA-07
- Population (2013): 65,771

Its length runs from the 3 S to 2 N and from 10 E to 11 E.

To the south, Ogooué-Lolo borders the Niari Region of the Republic of the Congo. Domestically, it borders the following provinces:

- Ngounié – west-southwest
- Moyen-Ogooué – northwest, at a quadripoint
- Ogooué-Ivindo – north and northwest
- Haut-Ogooué – east

== Departments ==
Ogooué-Lolo is divided into 4 departments:

- Lolo-Bouenguidi Department (Koulamoutou)
- Lombo-Bouenguidi Department (Pana)
- Mouloundou Department (Lastoursville)
- Offoué-Onoye Department (Iboundji)

== Historical population ==
Year	Population	Change	Density
1980	49,915	–	1.966/km^{2}
1993	43,915	−6,000/−12.02%	1.73/km^{2}

The population from 1981 to 1991 lost slightly more than one tenth of the total 1981 population. The population loss was slower than other provinces in Gabon.

== Places ==
Place	Latitude	Longitude	Altitude
Abena	1.1 S	13.1667 E	275 m
Angonde	1.0833 S	13.11667 E	274 m
Babaousa	0.8667 S	12.833 E	229 m
Badiabiki	1.6833 S	12.2833 E	698 m
Badouma	0.75 S	12.85 E	240 m
Bambecan	0.9667 S	12.7833 E	307 m
Bambera-Biyoko	1.11667 S	12.933 E	312 m
Bandangala	1.33 S	12.5667 E	551 m
Bangadi	1.1667 S	12.9833 E	318 m
Bangassou	0.95 S	12.65 E	262 m
Bangondo	1.4 S	12.45 E	478 m
Baniati	1.01667 S	12.21667 E	445 m
Baposso	0.6833 S	13.033 E	334 m
Bapouno	0.95 S	12.6 E	258 m
Bassaki	1.31667 S	12.11667 E	593 m
Bassegua	0.833 S	12.8 E	204 m
Bola Pessou	1.15 S	12.4833 E	364 m
Boudela	1.033 S	12.01667 E	600 m
Boudouga	1.1833 S	12.15 E	533 m
Boudoumbou	0.81667 S	12.7833 E	202 m
Boudzoumba	0.71667 S	13.01667 E	303 m
Boueka	1.3833 S	12.6333 E	507 m
Boulemba	1.0833 S	13.133 E	274 m
Boumabango	0.95 S	12.95 E	259 m
Boundgi	1 S	11.85 E	550 m
Boundji	0 S	12 E	195 m
Boundji	1.4 S	12.3833 E	603 m
Boungou	1.81667 S	12.51667 E	803 m
Bounzoukou	1.1 S	12.91667 E	313 m
Boupounza	1.2667 S	11.9833 E	664 m
Boussa	0.55 S	12.41667 E	190 m
Boussimbi	1.533 S	12.1833 E	670 m
Boussoka	1.1833 S	12.5833 E	449 m
Boussouniabamba	1.233 S	12.61667 E	466 m
Boutala	0 S	12 E	211 m
Boutemba	0.7667 S	12.533 E	196 m
Bouvinga	1.033 S	12.2 E	449
Bouyangoula	1.4 S	12.21667 E	621 m
Kokomingheli	0.71667 S	12.933 E	252 m
Konanadembe	1 S	12 E	453 m
Konanadembe	1.35 S	12.6833 E	475 m
Konda	1 S	12 E	426 m
Konda	1.31667 S	12.6833 E	461 m
Kondakoko	1.6 S	12.2833 E	682 m
Kongo-Godafala	0.91667 S	12.633 E	236 m
Kongou	1 S	12 E	608 m
Kouadembe	1 S	12.1833 E	453 m
Kouanou	1.3 S	12.2833 E	588 m
Koubala	1.3667 S	12.233 E	615 m
Koulamoutou	1.133 S	12.4833 E	355 m
Koumamala	1 S	12 E	613 m
Koumou	1.633 S	12.733 E	609 m
Kounadembe	1.433 S	12.3833 E	607 m
Kouta	1.22 S	12.25 E	606 m
Mogabo			457 m
Mogombofala			
