= Ogooué-Ivindo Province =

Province of Gabon

Ogooué-Ivindo
- Province
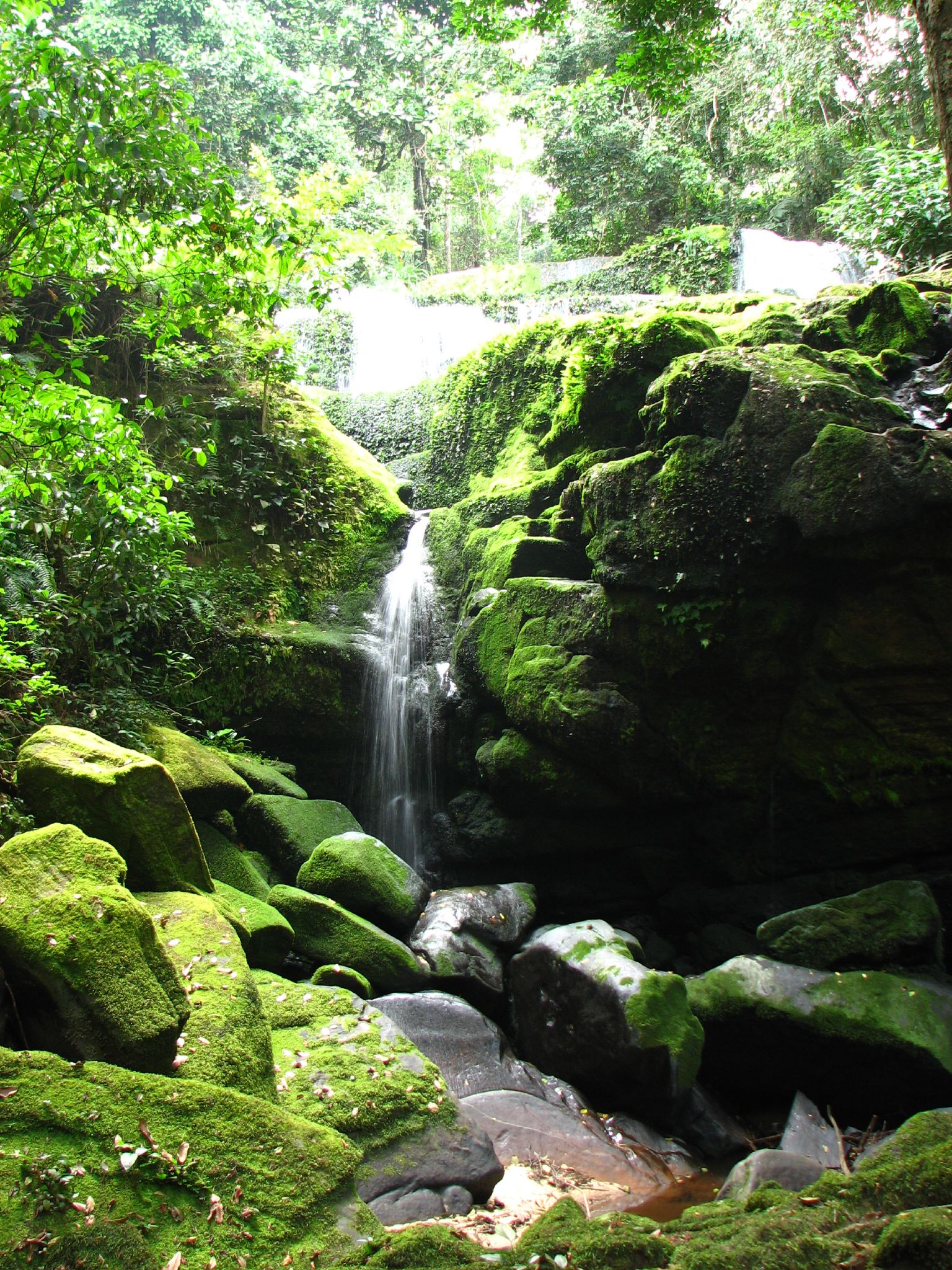
- Ivindo National Park

- Flag Coat of arms

- Ogooué-Ivindo Province in Gabon
- Coordinates: 0°36′N 12°42′E
- Country: Gabon
- Capital: Makokou

Area
  - Total: 46,075 km^{2} (17,790 sq mi)

Population (2013 census)
  - Total: 63,293
  - Density: 1.3737/km^{2} (3.5579/sq mi)
- HDI (2017): 0.690 medium

Ogooué-Ivindo Province is the northeasternmost of Gabon's nine provinces, though its Lopé Department is in the very center of the country. It gets its name from two rivers, the Ogooué and the Ivindo. This province, containing thousands of square kilometres of rainforest, is the largest and most sparsely populated and much less developed than the rest of the country. As of 2013 it had a population of 63,293 people. The principal town is Makokou.

== History ==
In 1873–4, Antoine-Alfred Marche and Victor de Compiègne (the Marquis de Compiegné) explored the Ogooué River region. They arrived in Lopé in 1874 but encountered hostility from the Fang-Meke people at the mouth of the Ivindo. Pierre Savorgnan de Brazza similarly made excursion to the region in November 1875 and between 1879 and 1882.

In January 1995, a bout of the Ebola virus broke out in the forests of Ogooué-Ivindo. Nine out of 19 people died in the cases registered out of a population of 350 people. In 2010 it was reported that yellow fever continued to affect the province.

== Population ==
The largest ethnic groups living in this province are the Fang, Kota, and the Kwele.

== Geography and wildlife ==
The province spans part of the centre to the northeast of Gabon, covering an area of 46,075 square kilometres (17,790 sq mi). Ogooué-Ivindo borders the Sangha and Cuvette-Ouest departments of the Republic of the Congo to the south and southeast, Haut-Ogooué to the southeast, Ogooué-Lolo to the south, Ngounié to the southwest (at a quadripoint), Moyen-Ogooué to the west, and Woleu-Ntem to the north-northwest. The southern part of the province is crossed by the Equator, with the Lopé Department lying mostly in the Southern Hemisphere. The regional capital is Makokou, 540 kilometres (340 mi) by road east of the national capital of Libreville and 175 kilometres (109 mi) southwest of Mékambo.

The principal rivers of the province are the Ogooué and the Ivindo. In the southwest is Ivindo National Park, established in 2002, which contains the Koungou, Mingouli and Djidji waterfalls. Lopé National Park, also in the southwest of the province, covering an area of 5,360 square kilometres (2,070 sq mi), lies to the north of the Chaillu Mountains and east of the Mingoué River. It is highly biologically rich, with over 1500 recorded plant species, 412 out of 700 species of bird found in Gabon, and large populations of mandrills, gorillas and chimpanzees. The Station D'Etudes des Gorilles et Chimpanzes, co-managed by the CIRMF and CWS, is a monitoring facility at Lopé. In the eastern part of the province is Mwagna National Park, which contains dense rainforest and is virtually uninhabited by humans but is biologically rich. The Lodié and the Louayé rivers flow through Mwagna National Park. Mount Bélinga contains resources of iron in the vicinity, which the government are planning on exploiting.

The lowland forests in the basin of the Ivindo River are home to one of the most diverse lowland forest avifaunas in all of Africa. Ipassa Research Station is an Important Bird Area near the provincial capital of Makokou, here 190 species of bird restricted to the Guinea-Congo Forest biome have been recorded, this is the highest total for any IBA within the biome.

=== Departments ===
Administratively, Ogooué-Ivindo is divided into 4 departments:

- Ivindo Department (Makokou)
- Lope Department (Booué)
- Mvoung Department (Ovan)
- Zadie Department (Mekambo)

== Landmarks ==
Makokou contains the Cathedral of Our Lady of Victories.

== Transport ==
The main roads passing through the province are the RN3 and RN4 roads. Makokou is home to Makokou Airport.
