= Haut-Ogooué Province =

Province of Gabon

Haut-Ogooué
- Province
- Flag Coat of arms

- Haut-Ogooué Province in Gabon
- Coordinates: 1°38′S 13°35′E
- Country: Gabon
- Capital: Franceville

Area
  - Total: 36,547 km^{2} (14,111 sq mi)

Population (2013)
  - Total: 250,799
  - Density: 6.9/km^{2} (18/sq mi)
- HDI (2017): 0.683 medium

Haut-Ogooué is the southeasternmost of Gabon's nine provinces. It is named after the Ogooué River. It covers an area of 36,547 km^{2} (14,111 sq mi). The provincial capital is Franceville. One of its primary industries is mining, with manganese, gold and uranium being found in the region. The uranium-bearing mineral francevillite takes its name from the primary city. It is the historical home of three cultures, the Obamba, Ndzebi and Téké. Like many regions in Africa, more traditional uses of the land have given way to rural migration to the larger cities. In August 2006, its soccer club won the Gabon Independence Cup.

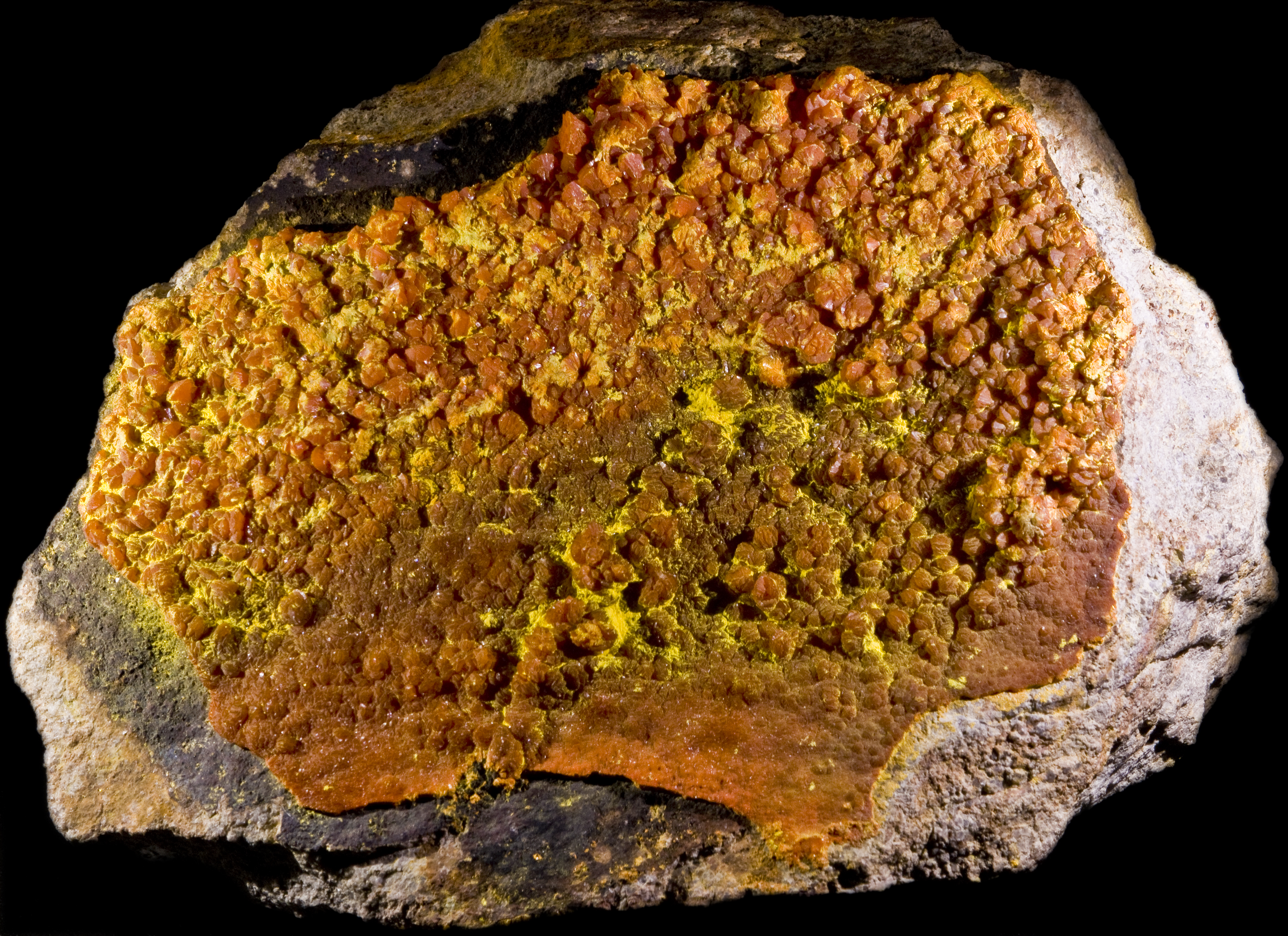
Francevillite from the Mounana mine, near Franceville.

To the northeast, east, and south, Haut-Ogooué borders several regions of the Republic of the Congo:

- Cuvette-Ouest – northeast
- Cuvette – east
- Plateaux – southeast
- Lékoumou – south
- Niari – southwest

Domestically, it borders the following provinces:

- Ogooué-Lolo – west
- Ogooué-Ivindo – north

== Departments ==
Departments of Haut-Ogooué

Haut-Ogooué is divided into 11 departments:

- Djoue (Onga)
- Djououri-Aguilli (Bongoville)
- Lekoni-Lekori (Akiéni)
- Lekoko (Bakoumba)
- Lemboumbi-Leyou (Moanda)
- Mpassa (Franceville)
- Plateaux (Lékoni)
- Sebe-Brikolo (Okondja)
- Ogooué-Létili (Boumango)
- Lékabi-Léwolo (Ngouoni)
- Bayi-Brikolo (Aboumi)
