= Department (administrative division) =

Administrative or political division in some countries

Map showing countries in the world that have departments as administrative divisions. As first level As second level

A department (French: département, Spanish: departamento) is an administrative or political division in several countries. Departments are the first-level divisions of 11 countries, nine in the Americas and two in Africa. An additional 10 countries use departments as second-level divisions, eight in Africa, and one each in the Americas and Europe.

As a territorial entity, "department" was first used by the French Revolutionary governments, apparently to emphasize that each territory was simply an administrative sub-division of the united sovereign nation. (The term "department", in other contexts, means an administrative sub-division of a larger organization.) This attempt to de-emphasize local political identity contrasts strongly with countries divided into "states" (implying local sovereignty).

The division of France into departments was a project particularly identified with the French revolutionary leader the Abbé Sieyès, although it had already been frequently discussed and written about by many politicians and thinkers. The earliest known suggestion of it is from 1764 in the writings of d'Argenson.

Today, departments may exist either with or without a representative assembly and executive head depending upon the countries' constitutional and administrative structure.

== Countries using departments ==
- Argentina*
- Benin
- Bolivia
- Burkina Faso
- Cameroon
- Chad
- Colombia
- Republic of the Congo
- (Ivory Coast) Côte d'Ivoire
- El Salvador
- France
- Gabon
- Guatemala
- Haiti
- Honduras
- Mauritania
- Nicaragua
- Niger
- Paraguay
- Peru
- Senegal
- Uruguay

*All provinces except Buenos Aires province.

== Former countries using departments ==
- Batavian Republic
- (Kingdom of Italy (Napoleonic)) Cisalpine Republic
- (France) French Empire
- Gran Colombia
- Centralist Republic of Mexico
- (Mexico) Second Mexican Empire
- (Netherlands) Kingdom of Holland
- (Kingdom of Italy (Napoleonic)) Kingdom of Italy (Napoleonic)
- (Kingdom of Italy (Napoleonic)) Italian Republic (Napoleonic)
- Peru (Note: Replaced by regions in 2002.)
- (Poland) Duchy of Warsaw
- United States (Note: Before Alaska became a U.S. state, it was designated as the "Department of Alaska".)
- Kingdom of Westphalia

== See also ==
- Administrative divisions
- Departments of the Duchy of Warsaw
- Departments of France
- Overseas departments and territories of France
