= Kinguélé Aval Hydroelectric Power Station =

Power station in Estuaire, Gabon

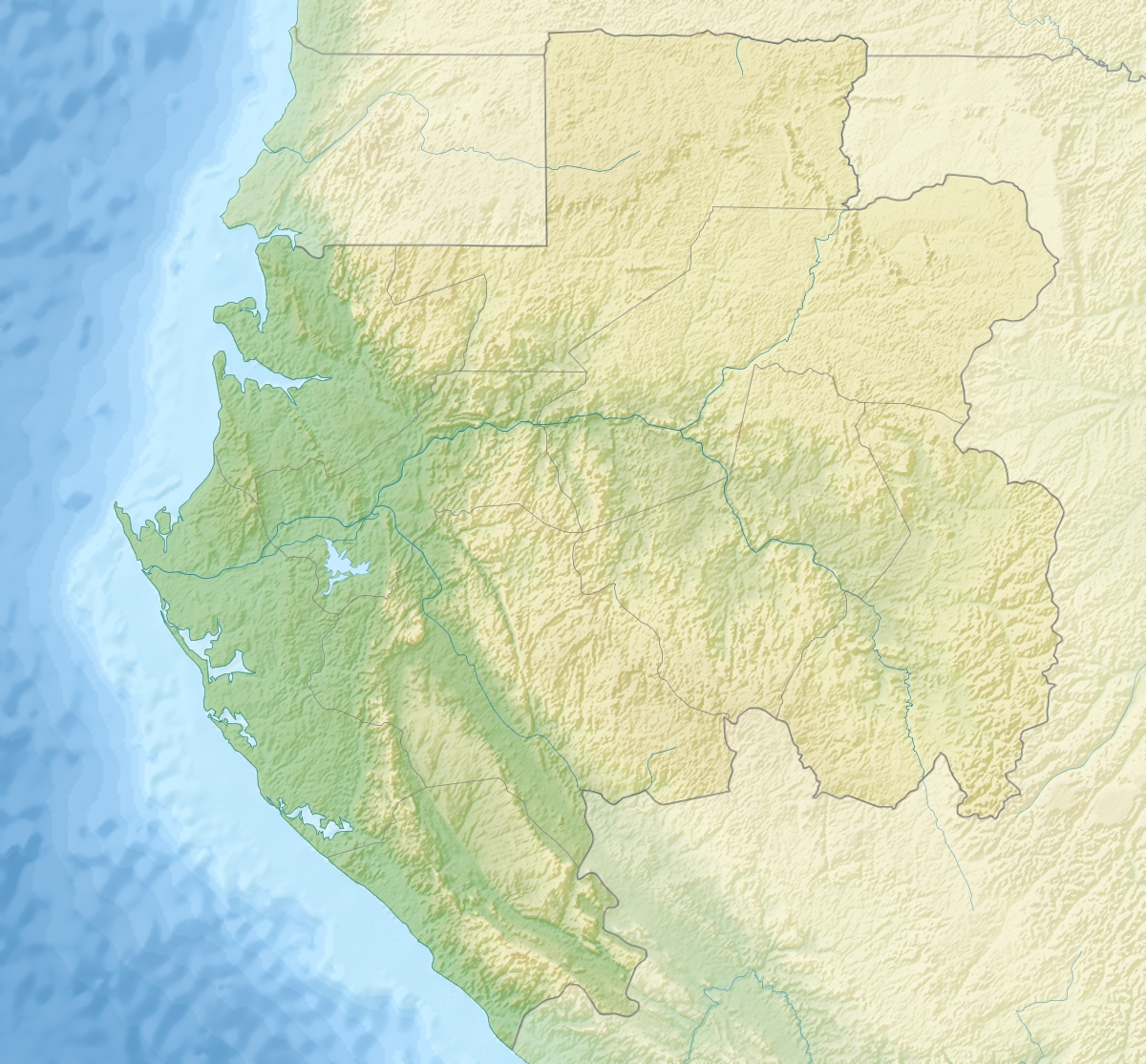
- Map of Gabon showing the location of Kinguélé Aval Power Station Kinguélé Aval Hydroelectric Power Station (Africa) Kinguélé Aval Hydroelectric Power Station (Earth)
- Country: Gabon
- Location: Estuaire Province
- Coordinates: 00°18′18″N 10°11′23″E
- Purpose: Power
- Status: Under construction
- Opening date: Q4: 2025 (expected)
- Construction cost: €179 million
- Owner: Asonha Energie SA
- Operator: Asonha Energie SA

Dam and spillways
- Type of dam: Run of river
- Impounds: Mbei River

Power Station
- Turbines: 2 x 17.5 MW
- Installed capacity: 35 megawatts (47,000 hp)
- Annual generation: 205 GWh

Kinguélé Aval Hydroelectric Power Station is a 35-megawatt (47,000 hp) hydroelectric power station, under construction across the Mbei River, a tributary of the Komo River, in Gabon. It is the first grid-ready, privately owned hydroelectric power station in the country.

== Location ==
The power station is located across the Mbei River, in Estuaire Province, approximately 100 kilometres (62 mi) east of Libreville, the capital and largest city in Gabon. Kinguélé Aval Hydroelectric Power Station will be downstream of the 69 megawatt Tchimbélé Hydroelectric Power Station and downstream of the 58 megawatt Kinguélé Hydroelectric Power Station.

== Overview ==
The power station is under development by a consortium comprising Meridiam, an international firm based in Paris, France, that focuses on "developing, financing and managing long-term public infrastructure projects", and the Gabonese Strategic Investment Fund (FGIS).

The owners have established a special-purpose vehicle company called Asonha Energie SA, to develop, manage and maintain the proposed power station and associated infrastructure developments. The energy generated at this power station will be sold to Société d’énergie et d’eau du Gabon (SEEG), the national electricity utility company, under a 30-year power purchase agreement (PPA).

== Ownership ==
The table below illustrates the shareholding in Asonha Energie, the special vehicle company, established to own, develop and manage the Kinguélé Aval Hydroelectric Power Station.

Shareholding in Asonha Energie SA
Rank	Shareholder	Domicile	Percentage
1	Meridiam	France	60.0
2	Gabon Power Company	Gabon	40.0
	Total		100.00

== Construction costs and funding ==
The engineering, procurement and construction (EPC) contract for this project was awarded to Sinohydro, the Chinese, state-owned hydropower engineering and construction company. The construction budget has been reported as €176 million (approx. US$209 million). Later, this was revised to €179 million (117.4 billion CFA francs).

The funders for this power station include the entities listed in the table below:

Sources of funding for Kinguélé Aval Hydroelectric Dam
Rank	Name of development partner	€ (million)	Percentage
1	African Development Bank	20.0	
2	Africa Growing Together Fund	10.0	
3	Sustainable Energy Fund for Africa	9.0	
4	International Finance Corporation	40.0	
5	Canada–IFC Program for Renewable Energy in Africa	25.0	
6	Development Bank of Southern Africa		
7	Emerging Africa Infrastructure Development Fund		
	Total	179.00	100.00

== See also ==
- List of power stations in Gabon
- FE2 Hydroelectric Power Station
