= Ngoulmendjim Hydrolectric Power Station =

Power station in Estuaire, Gabon

Ngoulmendjim Dam
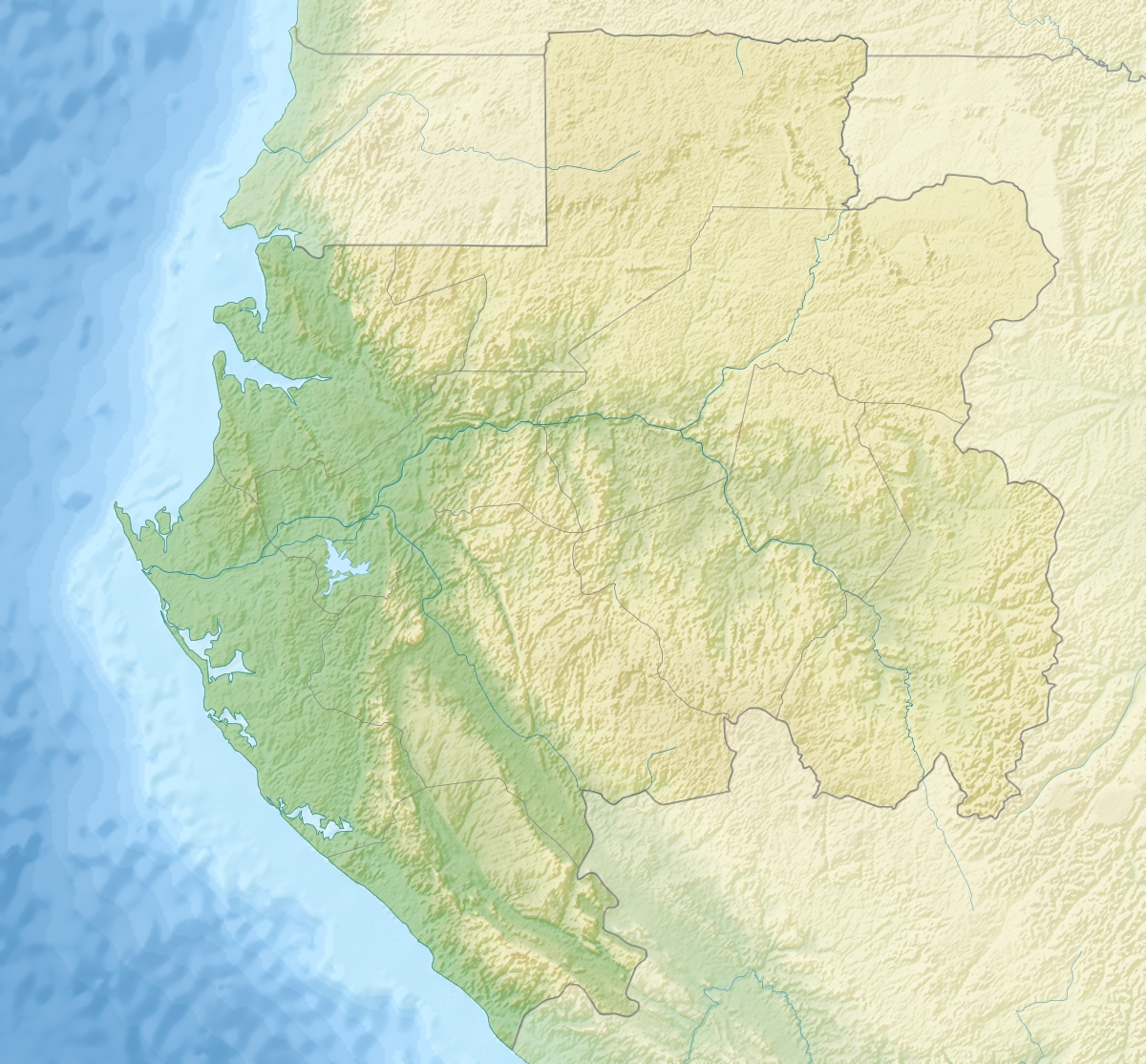
- Location of Ngoulmendjim Dam; Placement on map is approximate Ngoulmendjim Dam (Africa) Ngoulmendjim Dam (Earth)
- Location: Ngoulmendjim, Estuaire Province, Gabon
- Coordinates: 00°10′49″N 10°08′53″E
- Construction began: 2023 (expected)
- Opening date: 2028 (expected)
- Construction cost: €300 million

Dam and spillways
- Type of dam: Gravity dam
- Impounds: Komo River

Power Station
- Turbines: Pelton: 3 x 27.35 MW
- Installed capacity: 82 MW (110,000 hp)
- Annual generation: ~500 GWh

The Ngoulmendjim Power Station is a planned hydroelectric power station across the Komo River in Gabon. The power station is under development, by a consortium comprising the French conglomerate Eranove Group and Gabonese Fund for Strategic Investments (FGIS). As of November 2021, the development was in the "financial mobilization phase".

== Location ==
The power station would be located astride the Komo River, in Estuaire Province, about 125 kilometres (78 mi) southeast of the capital city of Libreville.

== Overview ==
Libreville, the capital city of Gabon, is home to approximately half of the country's population. As of 2018, 15-20 megawatts of new annual generation capacity, were required to keep up with new demand in Libreville alone. Ngoulmendjim HPP is intended to address this need.

The dam will have a crest width of 635 metres (2,083 ft) with maximum height of 38.5 metres (126 ft). This will form a reservoir with surface area in excess of 30 square kilometres (7,400 acres). Three Pelton turbines will be installed and are expected to generate 82 megawatts of electricity. The energy will be transmitted from the power station via a new 225kV transmission line, measuring 135 kilometres (84 mi) long, to a location where the electricity will enter the national grid. A 30-year power purchase agreement has been executed between the Government of Gabon and the power station developers.

== Ownership ==
The developers of this power station, have formed a special purpose vehicle company called Asokh Energy, that will own, design, develop, operate and maintain this HPP. The table below illustrates the shareholding in Asokh Energy.

Shareholding in Asokh Energy
Rank	Name of owner	Percentage ownership
1	Eranove Group	60.0
2	Gabon Power Company	40.0
	Total	100.0

Note: Gabon Power Company (GPC) is a subsidiary of Gabonese Fund for Strategic Investments (FGIS).

== Construction costs ==
The construction budget is reported as €300 million. The developer/owners have selected the African Development Bank as the lead arranger of a syndicated loan. The British financial house Standard Chartered Bank was selected to structure the loan.

== See also ==
- List of power stations in Gabon
- Dibwangui Hydroelectric Power Station
