= Dibwangui Hydroelectric Power Station =

Hydroelectric power station in Gabon

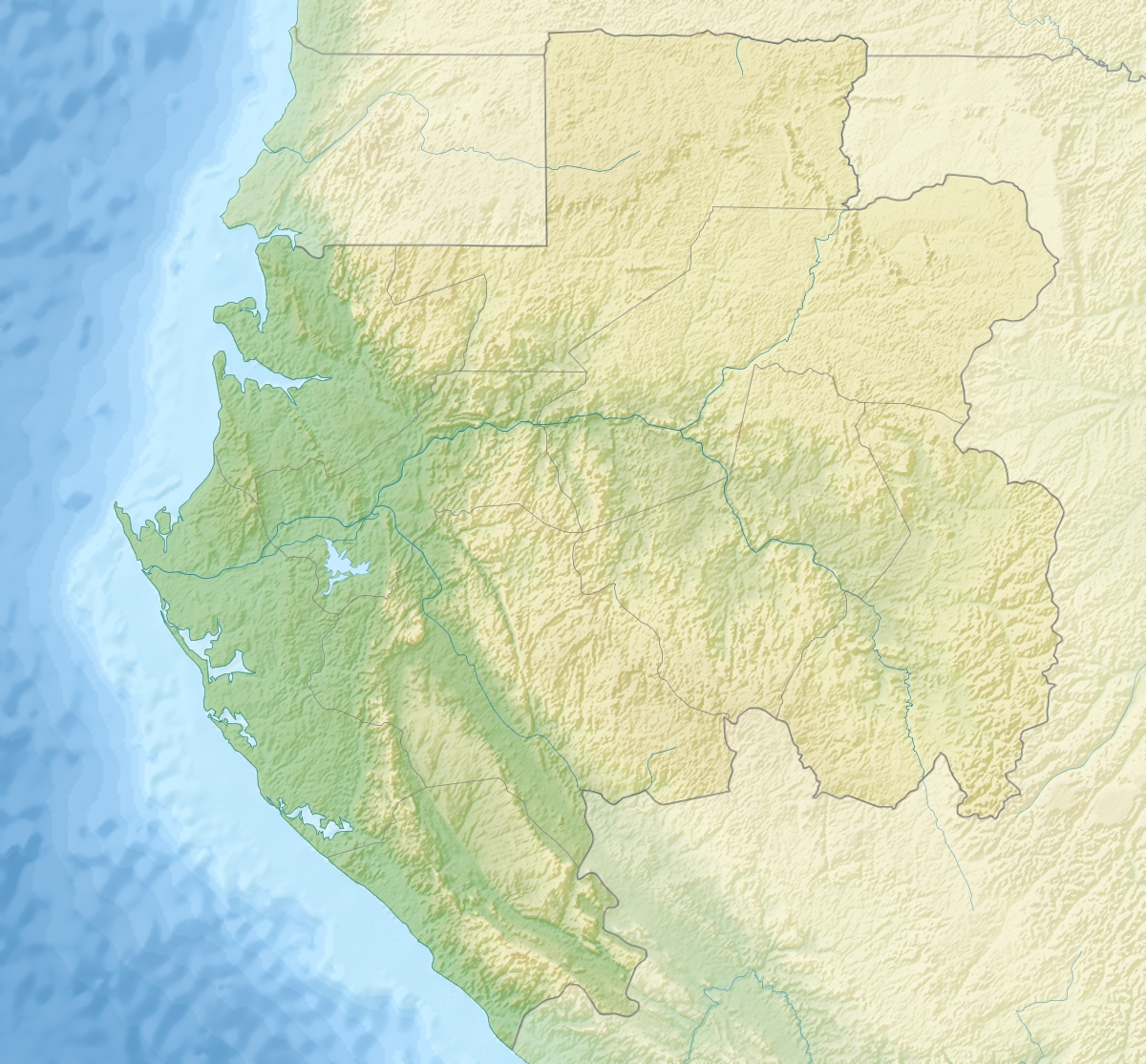
- Map of Gabon showing the location of Dibwangui HPP. Dibwangui Hydroelectric Power Station (Africa) Dibwangui Hydroelectric Power Station (Earth)
- Country: Gabon
- Location: Mandji Village, Ngounié Province
- Coordinates: 02°13′08″S 11°33′42″E
- Purpose: Power
- Status: Proposed
- Owner: Eranove
- Operator: Louetsi Energy

Dam and spillways
- Impounds: Louetsié River

Power Station
- Commission date: 21 March 2019
- Turbines: 3 x 5.1 MW Kaplan
- Installed capacity: 15 megawatts (20,000 hp)
- Annual generation: 90 GWh

Dibwangui Hydroelectric Power Station is a planned 15 megawatts hydroelectric power station in Gabon. The power station is under development by a consortium comprising (a) Eranove, a French independent power producer (IPP) and (b) Gabon Strategic Investment Fund (FGIS), a government-owned investment parastatal company. A long term power purchase agreement (PPA) was signed between the Gabonese authorities and Louetsi Energy, the special purpose vehicle (SPV) company which owns and is developing this power station.

== Location ==
The power station is located across the Louetsié River, at the village of Mandji, in Ngounié Province, in southwestern Gabon. The dam and power station are located approximately 550 kilometres (342 mi) by road, southeast of Libreville, the capital and largest city in the country.

== Overview ==
The design calla for a rock-fill concrete dam with hydraulic head of 23.7 metres (78 ft). Three Kaplan turbines, each rated at 5.1 MW are to be installed. A water flow rate of 25 cubic meters (25,000 L) per second is to be maintained at each turbine. The work includes the construction of an outdoor electrical substation at the power station. New overhead evacuation power lines will evacuate the power from Dibwangui to Bongolo. The electric substation at Bongolo will be expanded and remodeled to accommodate the incoming energy.

== Ownership ==
The consortium that owns the power statin and is developing it, has formed an ad hoc company called Louetsi Energy, to own, design, fund, develop, construct, operate and maintain the renewable energy infrastructure. The table below illustrates the shareholding in the ad hoc company.

Shareholding In Louetsi Energy
Rank	Shareholder	Domicile	Percentage	Notes
1	Eranove Group	France		
2	Gabon Strategic Investment Fund (FGIS)	Gabon		
	Total		100.0	

== Other considerations ==
A study conducted to determine the sustainability of this power station evaluated the proposed power plant across "eleven environmental, social and governance (ESG) performance criteria". In a report made public in 2020, the power station "achieved global good practice in ESG assessment" and is "rated as an example of international good practice in sustainability design and planning".

== See also ==
- List of power stations in Gabon
- Ngoulmendjim Hydrolectric Power Station
