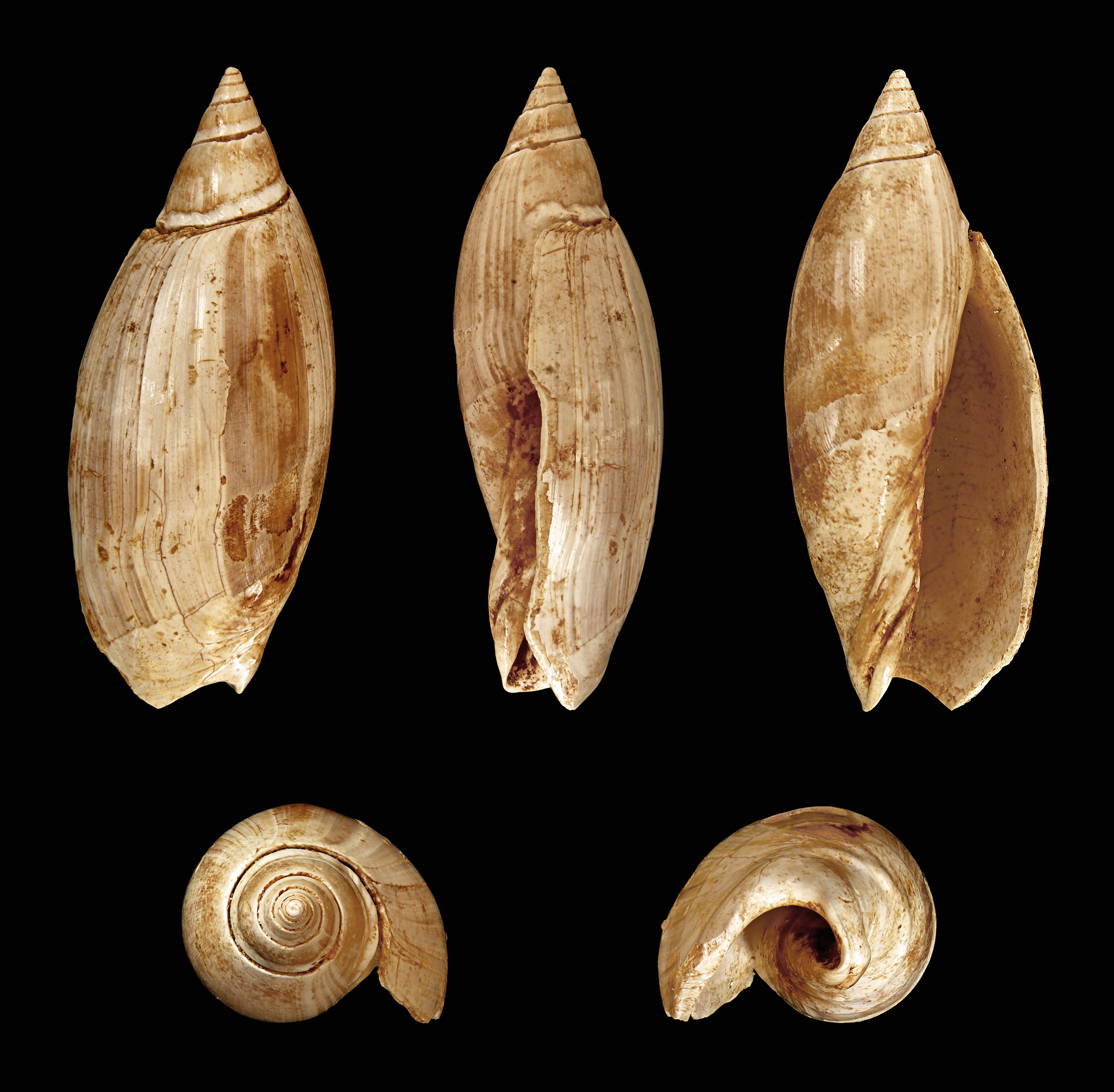

Scientific classification
- Kingdom: Animalia
- Phylum: Mollusca
- Class: Gastropoda
- Subclass: Caenogastropoda
- Order: Neogastropoda
- Family: Olividae
- Genus: Agaronia
- Species: A. plicaria

Binomial name
- Agaronia plicaria Lamarc, 1811

Synonyms
- Oliva ispidula (Linnaeus, 1758)

= Agaronia plicaria =

Species of gastropod

Agaronia plicaria is a species of sea snail, a marine gastropod mollusk in the family Olividae, the olives.
