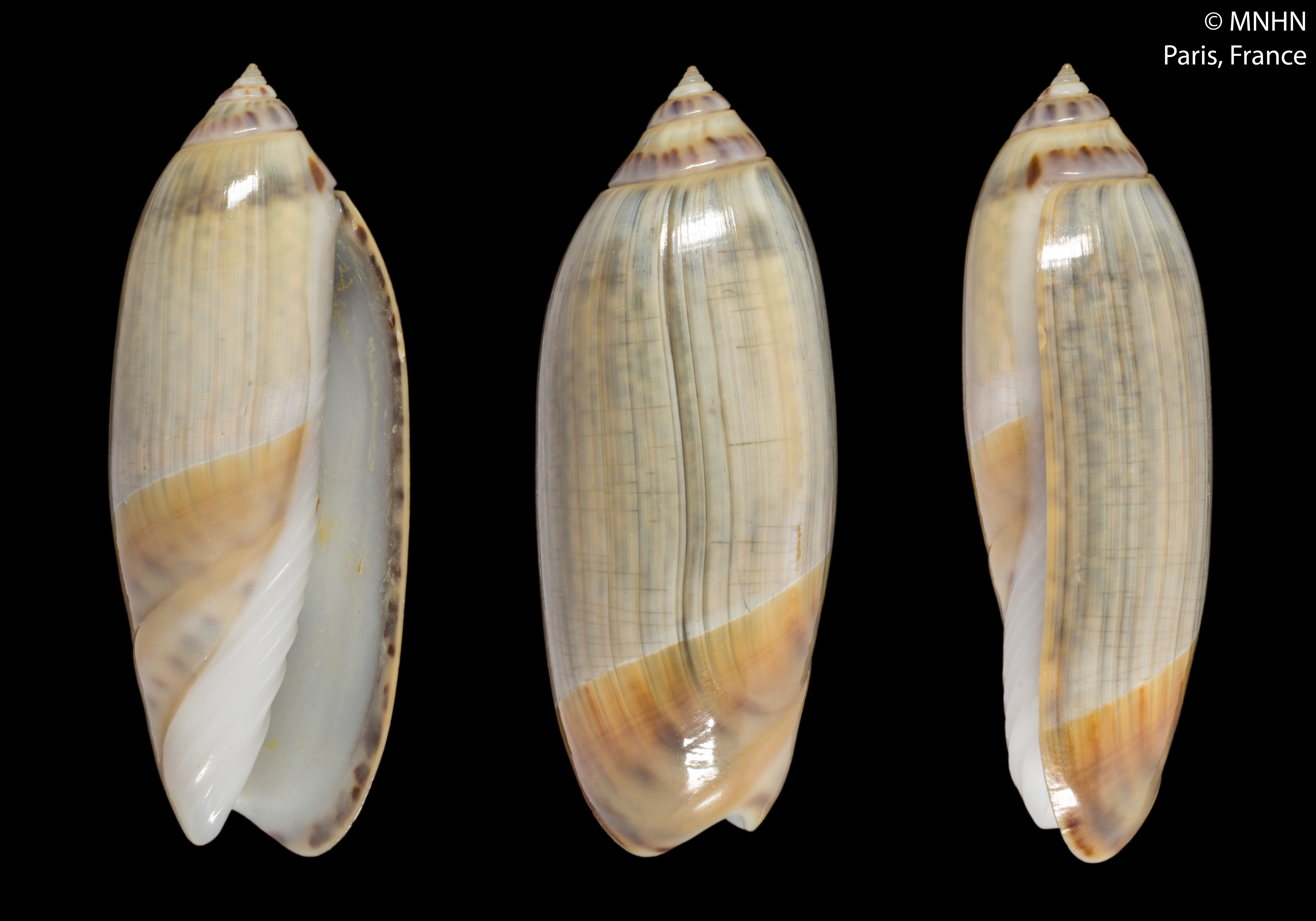
- An A. biraghii shell from different angles.

Scientific classification
- Kingdom: Animalia
- Phylum: Mollusca
- Class: Gastropoda
- Subclass: Caenogastropoda
- Order: Neogastropoda
- Family: Olividae
- Genus: Agaronia
- Species: A. biraghii

Binomial name
- Agaronia biraghii Bernard & Nicolay, 1984

= Agaronia biraghii =

Species of gastropod

Agaronia biraghii is a species of sea snail, a marine gastropod mollusk in the family Olividae, the olive shells.

== Description ==
The holotype of the species measures around 6.1 centimeters (2.4 inches) in length. A. biraghii exhibits predatory behaviour.

== Distribution ==
A. biraghii has been documented to appear along the Gulf of Guinea, including in the Komo River estuary of Gabon and on the coast of Pointe-Noire, Republic of Congo.
