= FE2 Hydroelectric Power Station =

Hydroelectric power station in Gabon

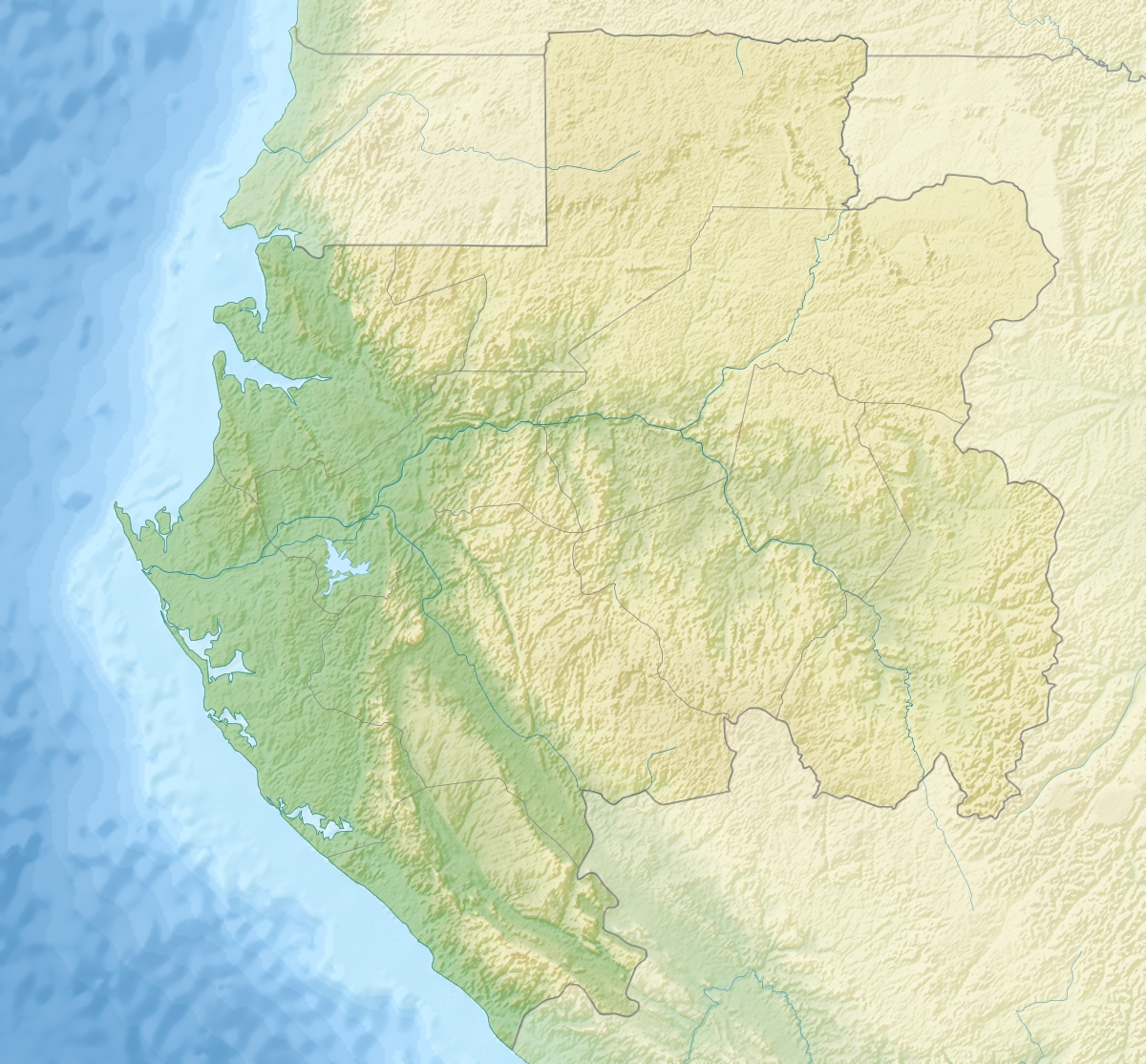
- Map of Gabon showing the location of FE2 HPP FE2 Hydroelectric Power Station (Africa) FE2 Hydroelectric Power Station (Earth)
- Country: Gabon
- Location: Mitzic, Okano Department, Woleu-Ntem Province
- Coordinates: 00°42′56″N 11°36′28″E
- Purpose: Power
- Status: Under construction
- Construction cost: €180 million
- Owner: Government of Gabon

Dam and spillways
- Impounds: Okano River

Power Station
- Turbines: 3 x 12 MW Francis type
- Installed capacity: 36 megawatts (48,000 hp)
- Annual generation: 240 GWh

The FE2 Hydroelectric Power Station is a 36 megawatt hydroelectric power station in Gabon. Construction of this dam began in 2010. Due to lack of adequate funding, work was abandoned in 2013. In 2018, after a five-year hiatus, Tebian Electric Apparatus Stock Limited (TBEA), a Chinese independent power producer (IPP), in collaboration with the Gabonese Strategic Investment Fund, indicated their intention to invest €180 million into the development of FE2 HPP. The engineering, procurement and construction (EPC) contract was awarded to the China Gezhouba Group Company (CGGC). The energy off-taker is Société d'Énergie et d'Eau du Gabon (SEEG), the national electricity utility company of Gabon.

== Location ==
The power station is located across the FE2 waterfall on the Okano River, southeast of the town of Mitzic, in Okano Department, in Woleu-Ntem Province, in northern Gabon. Mitzic is located approximately 112 kilometres (70 mi) south of the city of Oyem, the provincial headquarters. This is about 323 kilometres (201 mi) by road northeast of Libreville, the largest city and national capital of Gabon.

== Overview ==
The design of the power station calls for a run-of-the-river station with a hydraulic head of 88 metres (289 ft). Three vertical Francis type turbines, each rated at 12 MW, will provide a capacity of 36 megawatts. Other related infrastructure developments include a new substation, an evacuation transmission line, a workers' camp and access roads to the site.

It is expected that the off-taker of the energy generated here will be the national electricity utility parastatal company, SEEG. The power is intended for distribution to the city of Libreville, the national capital, to Ndjolé, in the Abanga-Bigne Department of Moyen-Ogooué Province and to the province of Woleu-Ntem.

== Recent developments ==
As of December 2020, the government of Gabon was still seeking funding to complete the construction of FE2 Hydroelectric Power Station, whose annual energy output is calculated at 240 GWh annually.

Aristide Ngari is the Director General, Ministry of Energy, Government of Gabon.

== See also ==
- List of power stations in Gabon
- Kinguélé Aval Hydroelectric Power Station
