= Anzem =

- Location in Gabon
- Coordinates: 0°36′N 10°30′E
- Country: Gabon
- Province: Estuaire Province
- Department: Komo Department

Anzem is a small town in Komo Department, Estuaire Province, in northwestern Gabon. The Komo River and Tchimbélé waterfall are located west of the town.
