= Ayémé Solar Power Station =

Solar farm in Gabon

- Country: Gabon
- Location: Ayémé Plaine, Komo Department, Estuaire Province
- Coordinates: 00°28′25″N 10°01′07″E
- Status: Proposed
- Construction began: 2022 Expected
- Commission date: 2024 Expected
- Owner: Solen Solar
- Operator: Solen Solar

Solar farm
- Type: Flat-panel PV

Power generation
- Nameplate capacity: 120 MW (160,000 hp)

The Ayémé Solar Power Station is a proposed 120 megawatts solar power plant in Gabon. The power station is under development by Solen, an independent power producer (IPP). The solar farm will be developed in two phases of 60 megawatts each. The energy generated at this power station is expected to be sold to the Energy and Water Company of Gabon (Société d’Energie et d’Eau du Gabon) (SEEG), for distribution in Libreville, the capital city of the county and its surrounding metropolis.

== Location ==
The power station is under construction in the village of Ayémé Plaine, located in Komo Department, Estuaire Province, approximately 30 kilometres (19 mi), north-northeast of Libreville.

== Overview ==
As of March 2022, Gabon's installed electricity generation capacity was reported as 750 megawatts. Of this, about 50 percent is sourced from natural gas. The remaining portion is sourced from hydropower and fossil-fuel sources. The Government of Gabon has ambitions to source 80 percent of its grid supply from renewable energy sources by 2030.

The design to this solar farm calls for a generation capacity of 120 megawatts, when fully developed. The power station will be developed in two phases of 60 megawatts each. The power is primarily for use in Libreville, where 250 megawatts of new generation are needed by 2023, in order to comply with previous environmental emissions commitments.

== Developers ==
The company that owns and is developing this power station, is called Solen. Solen specializes in building solar power stations in Africa. The company is based in France. In addition, Solen is expected to train the staff of SEEG, the Gabonese electric utility parastatal, in the operation and maintenance of solar power stations.

== See also ==
- List of power stations in Gabon
- Oyem Solar Power Station
