= Dapaong Solar Power Station =

Solar farm in Togo

- Country: Togo
- Location: Dapaong, Savanes Region
- Coordinates: 10°50′30″N 00°10′28″E
- Status: Proposed
- Construction cost: US$60 million
- Owner: Government of Togo
- Operator: TBA

Solar farm
- Type: Flat-panel PV
- Site area: 115 hectares (284 acres)

Power generation
- Nameplate capacity: 25 MW (34,000 hp)
- Annual net output: GWh

The Dapaong Solar Power Station is a planned 25 megawatts solar power plant in Togo. In April 2024, the Government of Togo announced an international tender for qualified international firms and consortia to submit bids of expression of interest in the design, procurement and installation of a 25 MW solar power plant, with attached battery storage power station (BESS) storage of 40MWh. The tender closed on 4 June 2024.

== Location ==
The power station would be located in the town of Dapaong, the capital city of Savanes Region, in the extreme north of the country, near the international border with Burkina Faso. Dapaong is located approximately 613 kilometres (381 mi), north of the central business district of the city of Lomé, the national capital and the country's largest city.

== Overview ==
Before 2024, a larger solar farm with generation capacity of 30 MW was envisaged. The successful EPC bidder will design a 25 MW solar photovoltaic plant with an attached 40 MWh BESS and a connected transmission and distribution network. The electricity is intended for distribution to about 60 locations in Savanes Region, servicing 600,000 to 700,000 Togolese customers.

== Other considerations ==
The construction of this solar farm is part of a World Bank-supported regional energy infrastructure development project. The US$311 million "Regional Emergency Solar Power Intervention Project" (RESPITE), covers the countries of Sierra Leone, Chad, Liberia, and Togo. It is also part of Togo's national program "Emergency Resilience Building Program in the Savanes Region" (PURS).

== See also ==
- List of power stations in Togo
- Blitta Solar Power Station
