= Kékéli Thermal Power Station =

Power station in Togo

- Location of Kékéli Thermal Power Station in Togo
- Country: Togo
- Location: Kékéli, Lomé
- Coordinates: 06°08′59″N 01°17′19″E
- Status: Operational
- Commission date: 2021
- Owner: Kékéli Energy Company

Thermal power station
- Primary fuel: Natural gas
- Secondary fuel: Steam

Power generation
- Nameplate capacity: 65 MW (87,000 hp)

Kékéli Thermal Power Station, also Kékéli Efficient Power Station, is a 65 MW (87,000 hp) natural gas-fired thermal power plant located in the city of Lomé, the capital of Togo.

== Location ==
The power station is located in the neighborhood known as Kékéli, located in the area of the Port of Lomé. "Kékéli" means "daybreak" in the local Mina language.

== Overview ==
The power station is owned and operated by a special purpose vehicle company, which for descriptive purposes we will call Kékéli Energy Company (KEC). KEC is a public private partnership; a joint venture between Kékéli Efficient Power, a Togolese subsidiary of Eranove, the French water and electricity infrastructure development and management conglomerate, based in Paris, and the Government of Togo.

The power station is a combined cycle installation with two phases, built separately but intended to work in synchrony. The first cycle built between June 2019 and April 2021, uses an SGT-800 gas turbine to generate 47 megawatts of electricity. In this phase, natural gas is mixed with air and ignited, the hot air produced, turns the turbine to generate the electricity.

The second cycle expected to be added between May 2021 and December 2021, uses the hot exhaust gases from the first cycle to heat water and convert it to steam in a heat recovery steam generator. The steam then generates an extra 18 megawatts of power in an SST-200 steam turbine, bringing the total output to 65 megawatts.

== Ownership ==
The special purpose vehicle company, referred to descriptively as Kékéli Energy Company, is owned by a consortium, as illustrated in the able below:

Shareholding In Kékéli Energy Company
Rank	Owner	Percentage Ownership	Notes
1	Kékéli Efficient Power	75.0	
2	Government of Togo	25.0	
	Total	100.0	

== Funding ==
Development of this power station benefitted from funding provided by (a) West African Development Bank (b) Africa Finance Corporation (c) Orabank Togo (d) BIA Togo (e) NSIA Benin and (f) Banque Atlantique Togo. The investments in the power plant are guaranteed by GuarantCo, a subsidiary of the Private Infrastructure Development Group, based in London, United Kingdom.

== Other considerations ==
When fully constituted, the power station will supply 532 GWh of power annually. This electricity will be sold directly to Togo Electricity Company (Compagnie énergie électrique du Togo), under a 25-year power purchase agreement. The energy generated is enough to supply 250,000 Togolese households or 1.5 million people, equivalent to an estimated 20 percent of the population of the country.

== See also ==
- List of power stations in Togo
