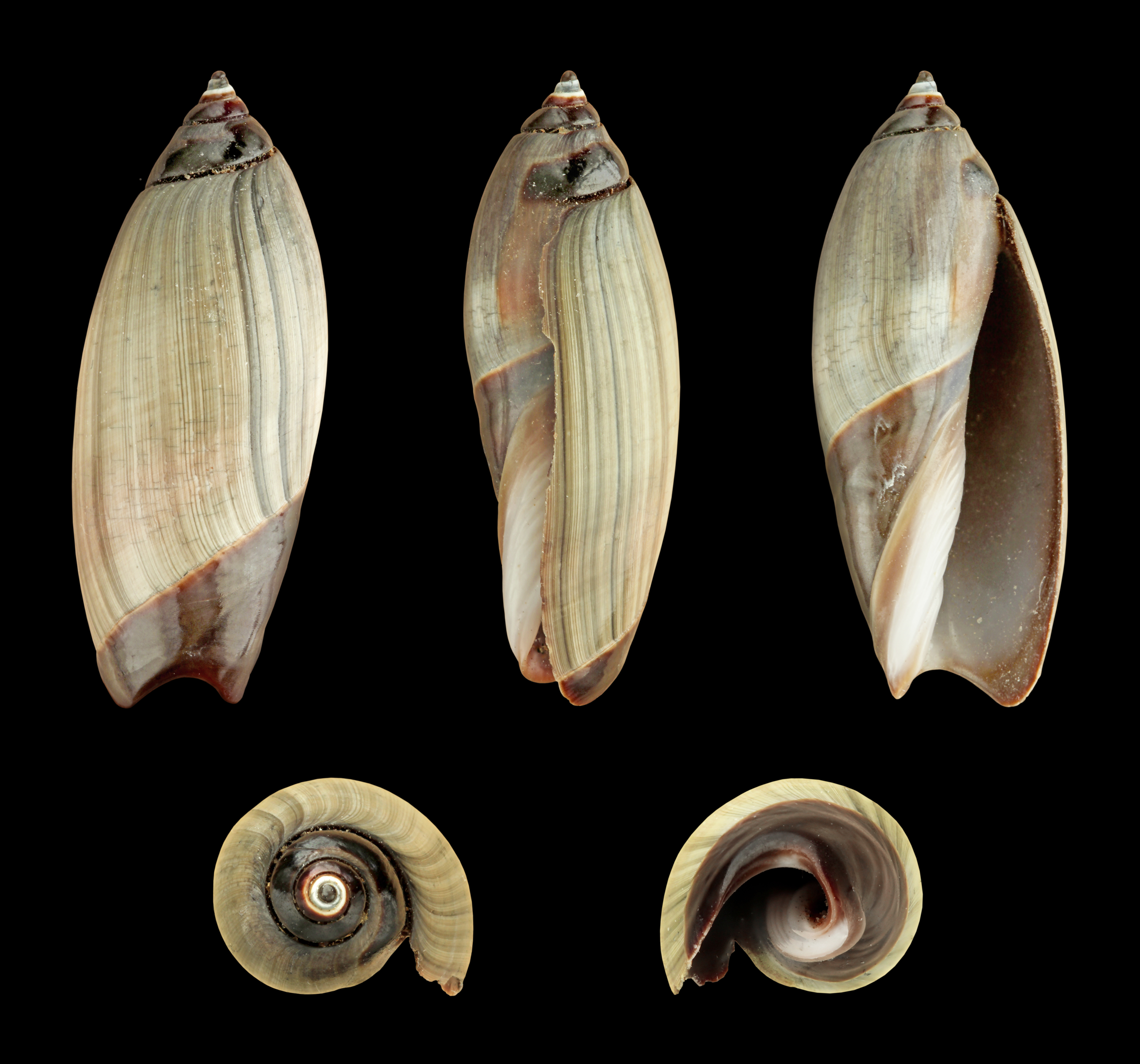

Scientific classification
- Kingdom: Animalia
- Phylum: Mollusca
- Class: Gastropoda
- Subclass: Caenogastropoda
- Order: Neogastropoda
- Family: Olividae
- Genus: Agaronia
- Species: A. propatula

Binomial name
- Agaronia propatula (Conrad, 1849)
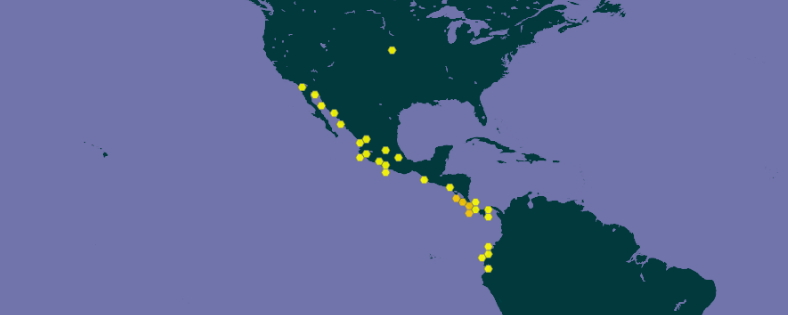

Synonyms
- Oliva propatula Conrad, 1849 superseded combination

= Agaronia propatula =

Species of gastropod

Agaronia propatula is a species of sea snail, a marine gastropod mollusk in the family Olividae, the olives.

== Description ==
(Original description) The shell is ovate-oblong and slightly swollen towards the base. It is pale ochraceous in color. The shell is adorned with sparse longitudinal zigzag brown lines and darker transverse hair-like lines, along with scattered spots. The rim is spread out and prominently grooved underneath. The base of the shell shows a carinated midsection with a deposited substance.

== Distribution ==
This species occurs in the Pacific Ocean off Central America and the coasts of Colombia and Ecuador.
