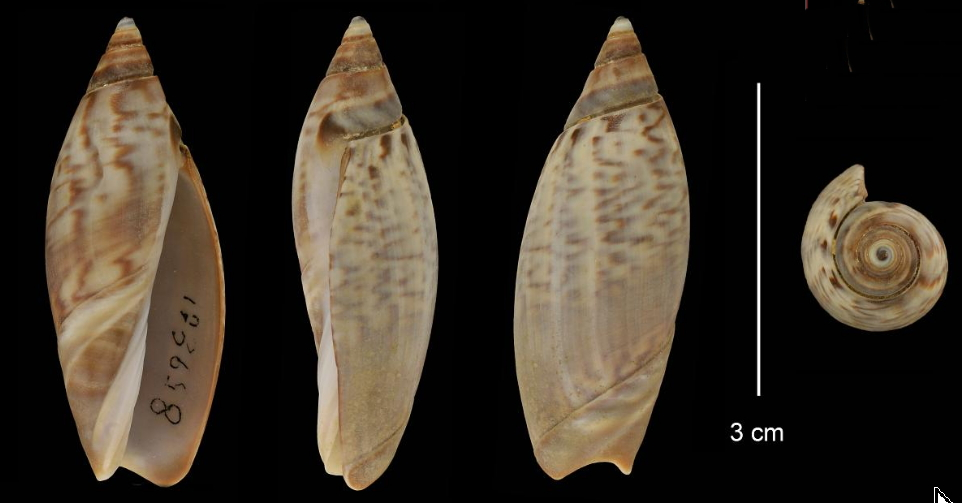
- Shell of Agaronia leonardhilli (holotype at the Smithsonian Institution)

Scientific classification
- Kingdom: Animalia
- Phylum: Mollusca
- Class: Gastropoda
- Subclass: Caenogastropoda
- Order: Neogastropoda
- Family: Olividae
- Genus: Agaronia
- Species: A. leonardhilli

Binomial name
- Agaronia leonardhilli Petuch, 1987

= Agaronia leonardhilli =

Species of gastropod

Agaronia leonardhilli is a species of sea snail, a marine gastropod mollusk in the family Olividae, the olives.

== Description ==
(Original description) The shell is narrow and very elongated, with a high, elevated spire. Half of the spire whorls are covered by enamel. The anterior enamel deposit is two-toned, with the posterior half being dark brown and the anterior half gray or white.

The aperture is narrow, and the columella is slender with twisted plications.

The shell is gray with numerous large, dark brown zigzag longitudinal flammules. On the dorsum, these zigzag flammules only extend down the posterior half of the shell, leaving a wide, clear gray band around the anterior half. The edge of the shoulder along the suture is marked with conspicuous, large, intermittent dark brown patches. The spire enamel is grayish-brown, and the interior of the aperture is brown.

== Distribution ==
Locus typicus: "Off Roatan Island, Honduras."
