= List of power stations in Togo =

This article lists all power stations in Togo.

== Hydroelectric ==
Hydroelectric station	Community	Coordinates	Type	Capacity	Year completed	Name of reservoir	River
Nangbeto Dam			Reservoir	65.6 MW	1987		Mono River

== Thermal ==
Thermal power station	Community	Coordinates	Fuel type	Capacity	Year completed	Name of owner	Notes
Lome Thermal Power Station	Lomé		Heavy fuel oil or light fuel oil or natural gas	100 MW	2010	Endeavor Energy of Houston, Texas	
Kékéli Thermal Power Station	Lomé	6.149722°N 1.288611°E	Natural gas & steam	65 MW	2021	Eranove of Paris, France	

== Solar ==
Solar power station	Community	Coordinates	Fuel type	Capacity	Year completed	Name of owner	Notes
Takpapièni solar power plant			Solar	0.1 MW	2018		
Blitta Solar Power Station	Blitta	08°18′28″N 01°00′37″E	Solar	50 MW	2021	AMEA Togo Solar	Expandable to 70MW
Kpalassi Solar Power Station	Kpalassi	09°24′50″N 01°13′33″E	Solar	42 MW	TBD	Tender ongoing	

== See also ==
- List of power stations in Africa
- List of largest power stations in the world
