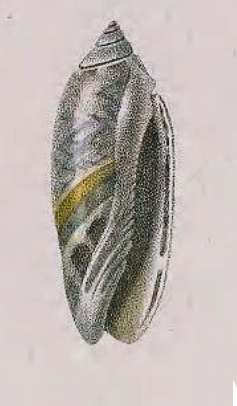
- Drawing of a shell of Agaronia junior (holotype)

Scientific classification
- Kingdom: Animalia
- Phylum: Mollusca
- Class: Gastropoda
- Subclass: Caenogastropoda
- Order: Neogastropoda
- Family: Olividae
- Genus: Agaronia
- Species: A. junior

Binomial name
- Agaronia junior (Duclos, 1840)

Synonyms
- Oliva utriculus junior Duclos, 1840 (basionym)

= Agaronia junior =

Species of gastropod

Agaronia junior is a species of sea snail, a marine gastropod mollusc in the family Olividae, the olives.

== Distribution ==
This marine species occurs off Sri Lanka.
