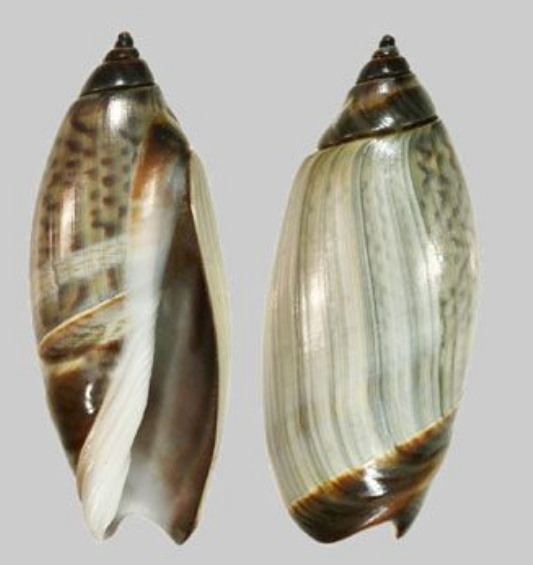
- Shell of Agaronia griseoalba (specimen at the Natural History Museum Rotterdam)

Scientific classification
- Kingdom: Animalia
- Phylum: Mollusca
- Class: Gastropoda
- Subclass: Caenogastropoda
- Order: Neogastropoda
- Family: Olividae
- Genus: Agaronia
- Species: A. griseoalba

Binomial name
- Agaronia griseoalba (E. von Martens, 1897)
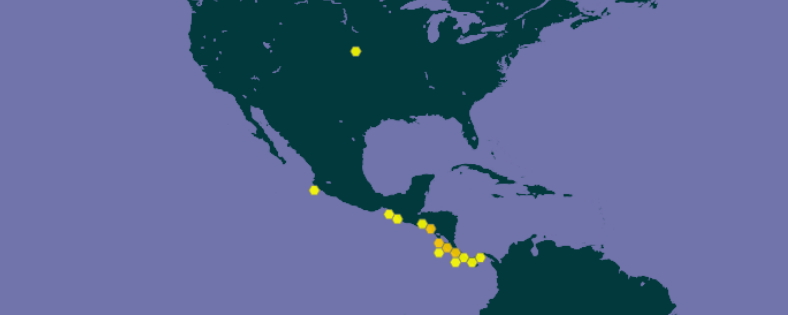

Synonyms
- Agaronia murrha S. S. Berry, 1953 junior subjective synonym; Oliva testacea var. griseoalba E. von Martens, 1897 (original rank)

= Agaronia griseoalba =

Species of gastropod

Agaronia griseoalba is a species of sea snail, a marine gastropod mollusk in the family Olividae, the olives.

== Description ==
The length of the shell varies between 36 mm and 39 mm.

(Original description in German) The spire is relatively short, approximately one-third of the total shell length. The shell has a moderately expanded aperture. The outer lip is somewhat thick and adheres slightly at the top.

The exterior of the shell is greyish-white, with faint grey shadows marking growth streaks. The initial part of the body whorl on the ventral side shows vertical rows of pale brown spots, which become increasingly faint or disappear entirely towards the end. There are no distinctive markings under the suture, but there is a pale reddish-brown spot near the upper end of the aperture wall. The basal band is white, with a subtle yellowish hue in its lower half. All columellar folds are pure white. The inner lip of the aperture is chestnut brown, occasionally interrupted by grey patches, while the inner edge of the aperture is pure white.

== Distribution ==
This marine species occurs in the Mexican part of the North Pacific Ocean; also off Costa Rica, Panama, Nicaragua and El Salvador.
