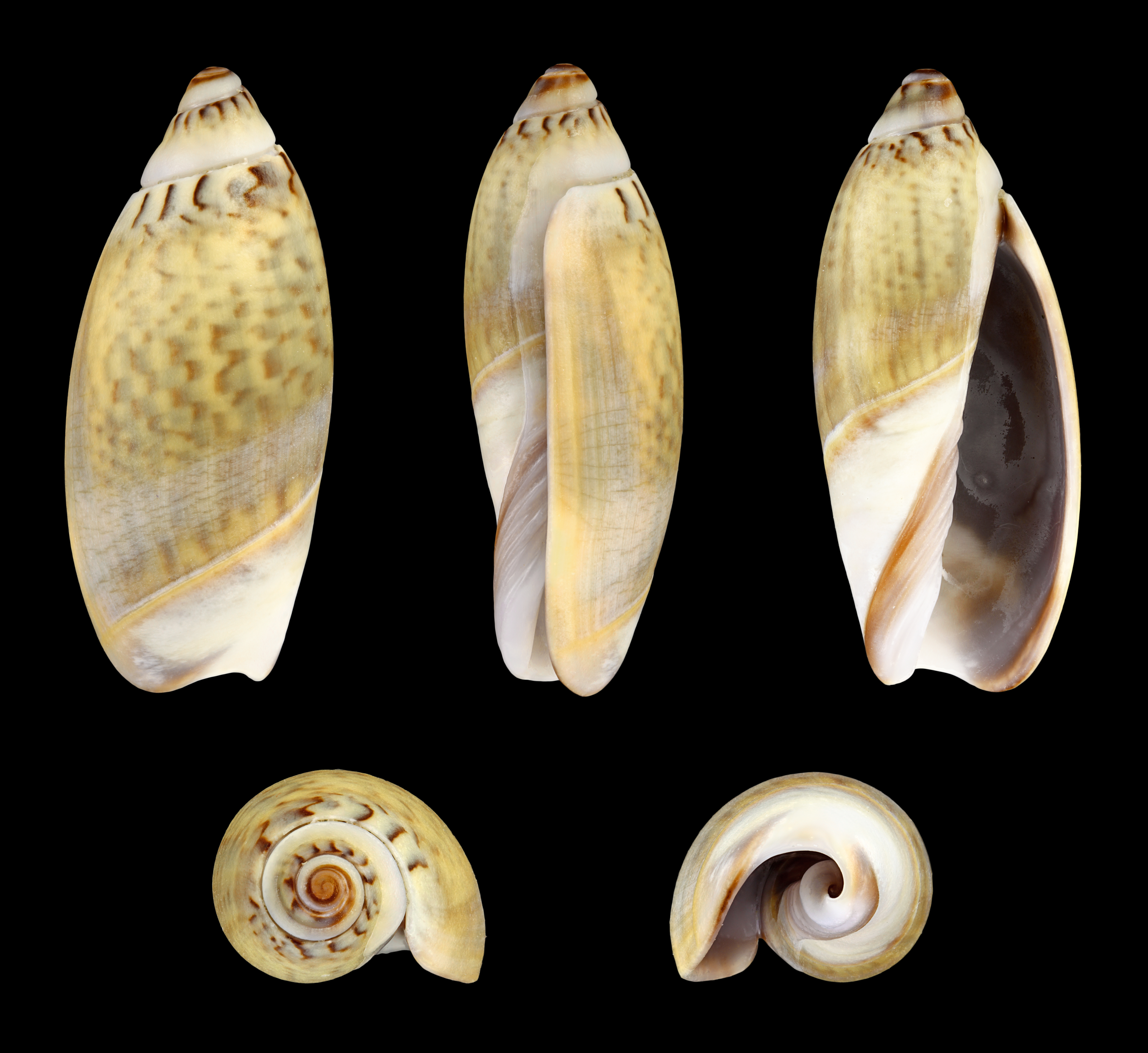

Scientific classification
- Kingdom: Animalia
- Phylum: Mollusca
- Class: Gastropoda
- Subclass: Caenogastropoda
- Order: Neogastropoda
- Family: Olividae
- Genus: Agaronia
- Species: A. hiatula

Binomial name
- Agaronia hiatula (Gmelin, 1791)

Synonyms
- Oliva agaronia Duclos, 1844; Oliva hiatula Gmelin, 1791); Oliva hiatula var. maculifera E. von Martens, 1897 junior homonym (suspected synonym); Oliva nitelina Duclos, 1835; Voluta hiatula Gmelin, 1791 (original combination)

= Agaronia hiatula =

Species of gastropod

Agaronia hiatula is a species of sea snail, a marine gastropod mollusk in the family Olividae, the olives.

== Description ==
The shell is thin, with a raised spire and a large aperture, somewhat dilated at the base. The columellar folds are very oblique. The shell color ranges from cream to light brown or olivaceous, often featuring nebulous or zigzag brown longitudinal markings. The fasciole is either lighter or darker but lacks any markings. The interior varies from cream to chocolate and may sometimes display the external markings.

== Distribution ==
This marine species occurs from Mauritania to Nigeria into the Gulf of Guinea (Principe Island), except the Cape Verde Islands, in shallow water at depths of 1 to 10 m.
