= Blitta Solar Power Station =

Solar park in Togo

- Official name: Mohamed Bin Zayed Power Station
- Country: Togo
- Location: Blitta, Centrale Region
- Coordinates: 08°18′28″N 01°00′37″E
- Status: Operational
- Construction began: Q1 2020
- Commission date: June 2021
- Construction cost: €33.5 million
- Owner: Amea Power
- Operator: Amea Togo Solar

Solar farm
- Type: Flat-panel PV

Power generation
- Nameplate capacity: 50 MW (67,000 hp), under expansion to 70 MW (94,000 hp)

The Blitta Solar Power Station is an operational 50 MW (67,000 hp) solar power plant in Togo. The power station was developed by Amea Power, an independent power producer (IPP) based in the United Arab Emirates. The solar farm, which is the largest grid-ready in Togo, is also referred to as Mohamed Bin Zayed Power Station, named after His Highness Sheikh Mohamed bin Zayed Al Nahyan, the Crown Prince of Abu Dhabi. The power station began commercial operations in June 2021.

== Location ==
The power station is located in the settlement of Blitta, in the Centrale Region of Togo, approximately 83.5 kilometres (51.9 mi), by road, south of Sokodé, the regional capital. This is approximately 267 kilometres (166 mi) by road north of Lomé, the national capital and largest city in the country.

== Overview ==
The power station's installed capacity is 50 megawatts. Its output is sold directly to the government of Togo for integration into the national electricity grid, under a 25-year power purchase agreement. The solar park is operated and maintained by Amea Togo Solar, the local subsidiary of Amea Power, the UAE-based IPP that owns the power station. It is expected that the power station will provide electricity to 600,000 homes and 700 small and medium-sized enterprises, in Togo.

== Developers ==
The power station was developed by Amea Power, an independent power producer based in the United Arab Emirates. The solar park is operated by Amea Togo Solar, the local subsidiary of the Middle Eastern owners.

== Funding and timeline ==
The table below outlines the sources of funding for the construction of this power station.

Sources of funds For construction of Blitta Solar Power Station
Rank	Development partner	Contribution in euros	Percentage	Notes
1	Abu Dhabi Fund for Development	13.6 million	40.60	Loan
2	West African Development Bank	10.7 million	31.94	Loan
3	Amea Power	9.2 million	27.46	Equity investment
	Total	33.5 million	100.00	

Construction began in February 2020. Commercial commissioning took place in June 2021.

== Expansion ==
In November 2022, AMEA Power Company, the Dubai-based IPP, secured a US$25 million loan for the purpose of increasing capacity of the power station from 50 MW to 70 MW. In addition a battery storage facility, rated at 4 MWh will be added to the installation, to facilitate power supply after sunset. The EPC contractor for the expansion and energy storage installation is Amea Power's subsidiary, Amea Technical Services. The loan was provided by the Abu Dhabi Export Office (ADEX), a "financial facility of the Abu Dhabi Fund for Development (ADFD)".

In March 2023, the work on the third phase of expansion from 50 MW to 70 MW officially began, when it was flagged off by the president of Togo, Faure Essozimna Gnassingbé. The expansion to 70 megawatts and the addition of 4 MWh storage capacity was expected to conclude no later than December 2023.

== Other considerations ==
When fully developed, the 70 MW power station with the energy storage attachment will become the largest solar power plant in West Africa. At that time it is calculated that the solar farm will meet the electricity needs of at least 222,000 Togolese households.

== See also ==
- List of power stations in Togo
- Dapaong Solar Power Station
- Kpalassi Solar Power Station
- Oyem Solar Power Station
