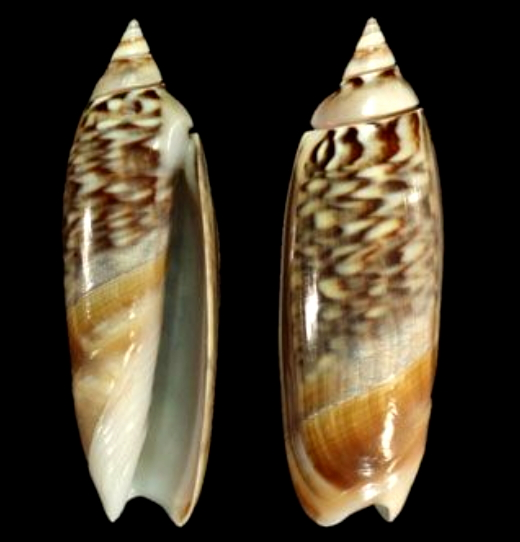
- Shell of Agaronia lutaria (specimen at Natural History Museum Rotterdam)

Scientific classification
- Kingdom: Animalia
- Phylum: Mollusca
- Class: Gastropoda
- Subclass: Caenogastropoda
- Order: Neogastropoda
- Family: Olividae
- Genus: Agaronia
- Species: A. lutaria

Binomial name
- Agaronia lutaria (Röding, 1798)
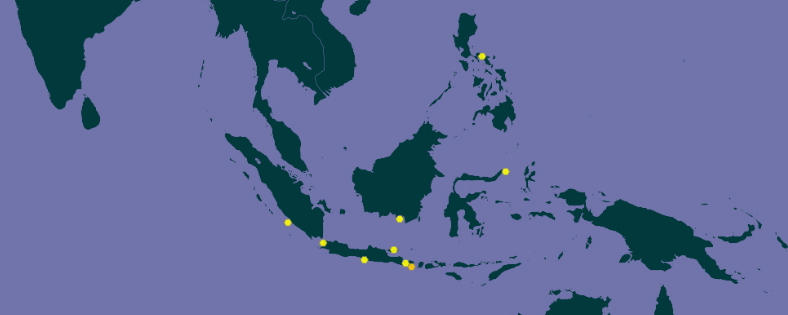

Synonyms
- Oliva (Olivancillaria) subulata Lamarck, 1811; Oliva subulata Lamarck, 1811; Porphyria lutaria Röding, 1798 (original combination)

= Agaronia lutaria =

Species of gastropod

Agaronia lutaria is a species of sea snail, a marine gastropod mollusk in the family Olividae, the olives.

== Description ==
The length of the shell attains 44 mm.

Shell size gets up to 55 mm.

(Original description in Latin) The brown-plumbeous is cylindrical-subulate. It is adorned with spots along the upper edge of the whorls. The shell is broadening towards the base, which is obliquely tinged with yellow.

== Distribution ==
This marine species occurs off Indonesia.
