= Kpalassi Solar Power Station =

Solar power station in Togo

- Country: Togo
- Location: Kpalassi, near Awandjelo, Assoli Prefecture, Kara Region
- Coordinates: 09°24′50″N 01°13′33″E
- Status: Proposed
- Operator: Kpalassi Solar Company

Solar farm
- Type: Flat-panel PV

Power generation
- Nameplate capacity: 42 megawatts (56,000 hp)

Kpalassi Solar Power Station (also Awandjélo Solar Power Station) is a 42 megawatts (56,000 hp) solar power plant, under development in Togo. The power station is being developed by the government of Togo, through the Agence Togolaise d’Electrification Rurale et des Energies Renouvelables (AT2ER) (Togolese Agency for Rural Electrification and Renewable Energy), with loans from the World Bank Group and from the West African Development Bank, under the Scaling Solar program.

== Location ==
The power station would be located in Kpalassi Village, near the town of Awandjélo, in the Assoli Prefecture of the Kara Region, in the north of Togo. Awandjélo is located approximately 12.5 kilometres (8 mi) south of Kara, the provincial capital. This is about 400 kilometres (249 mi) north of Lomé, the national capital and largest city of Togo.

== Overview ==
The International Finance Corporation (IFC), the "private window" of the World Bank Group, has a program called "Scaling Solar", which encourages and provides financing to sub-Saharan African countries to diversify energy sources by setting up solar generation stations, either by themselves or in public private partnerships (PPPs) with independent power producers (IPPs). Togo signed up for the Scaling Solar mechanism in 2019. This is one of the first three solar farms under that arrangement. The design calls for a capacity of 42 megawatts.

== Developers ==
The IPP for this power station was still in the tender stage, as of June 2022.

== Financing ==
As of July 2022, the West African Development Bank had committed to lend €38 million towards the construction of this power station.

== See also ==
- List of power stations in Togo
- Blitta Solar Power Station
