= Agaronia java =

Scientific classification
- Kingdom: Animalia
- Phylum: Mollusca
- Class: Gastropoda
- Subclass: Caenogastropoda
- Order: Neogastropoda
- Family: Olividae
- Genus: Agaronia
- Species: A. java

Binomial name
- Agaronia java S. K. Tan, H. E. Ng, S. Y. Chan & L. H. S. Nguang, 2019

Species of gastropod

Agaronia java is a species of sea snail, a marine gastropod mollusc in the family Olividae, the olives.

== Distribution ==
This marine species occurs off Java from the Sunda Strait to Bali Strait, Indonesia.
