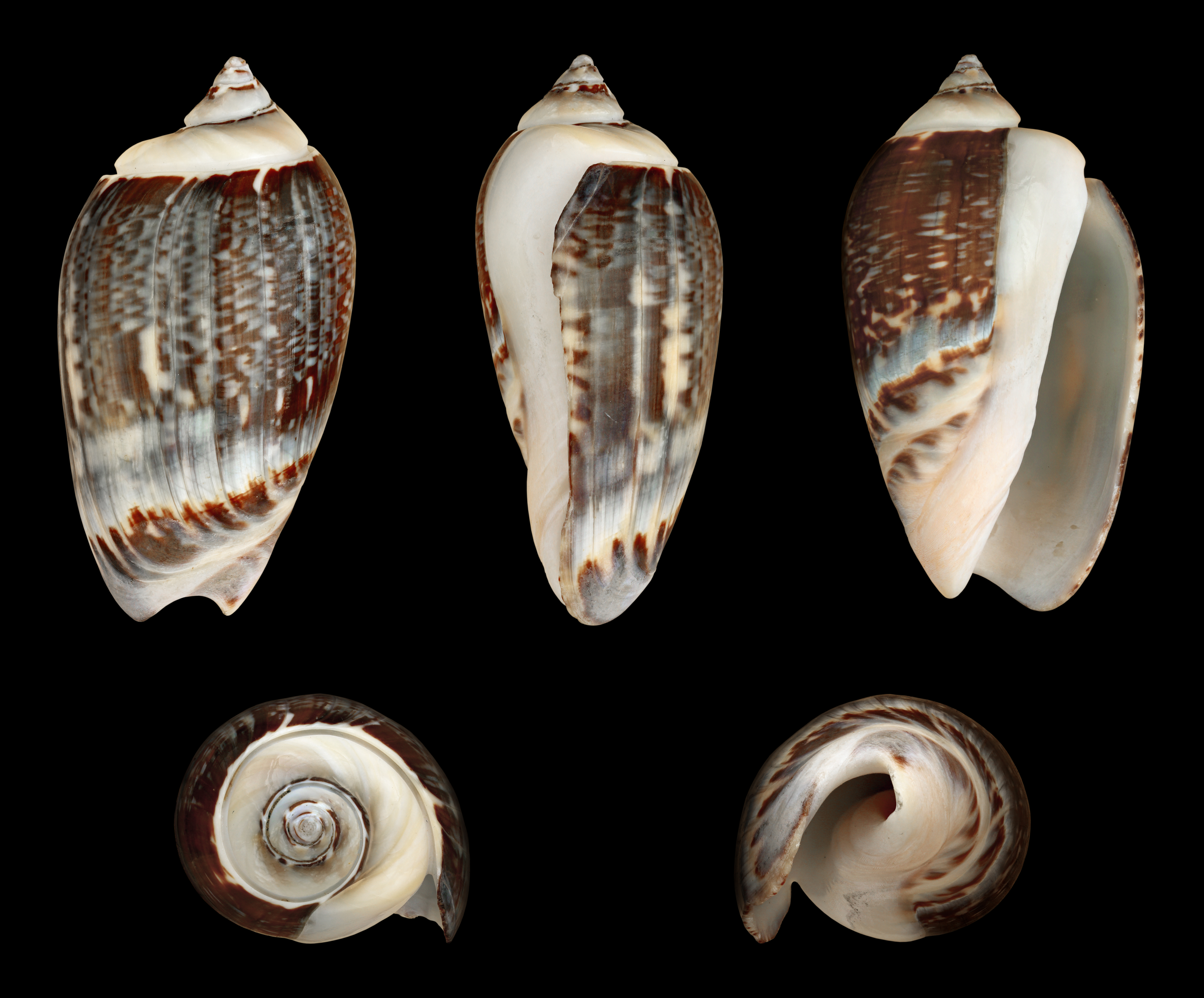
- Five views of a shell of Agaronia gibbosa (Born, 1778)

Scientific classification
- Kingdom: Animalia
- Phylum: Mollusca
- Class: Gastropoda
- Subclass: Caenogastropoda
- Order: Neogastropoda
- Family: Olividae
- Genus: Agaronia
- Species: A. gibbosa

Binomial name
- Agaronia gibbosa (Born, 1778)
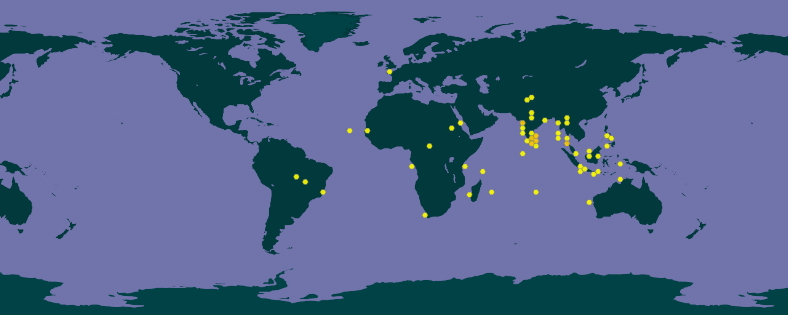

Synonyms
- Agaronia nebulosa (Lamarck, 1822); Oliva gibbosa (Born, 1778); Oliva gibbosa var. candicans Melvill, 1904; Oliva gibbosa var. flavescens Melvill, 1904; Oliva gibbosa var. fulgurans Melvill, 1904; Oliva gibbosa var. mediocincta Melvill, 1904; Oliva intricata Marrat, 1871; Oliva nebulosa Lamarck, 1822; Oliva utriculus (Gmelin, 1791); Olivancillaria gibbosa (Born, 1778); Olivancillaria gibbosa var. flavescens Melvill, 1890; Olivancillaria gibbosa var. mediocincta Melvill, 1890; Voluta gibbosa Born, 1778 (original combination); Voluta utriculus Gmelin, 1791

= Agaronia gibbosa =

Species of gastropod

Agaronia gibbosa is a species of sea snail, a marine gastropod mollusk in the family Olividae, the olives.

== Description ==
The shell of this species measures 40–75 mm in length.

The shell is heavy and gibbous, with a notably callous columella, particularly thickened at the upper part. The spire is also robustly thickened. The shell is primarily cream-colored, with the body whorl featuring zigzags and reticulations that range from ash-gray to orange and chocolate. The fasciole is yellowish and maculated with brown. The columella and the interior of the aperture are whitish.

Agaronia gibbosa is variable in shape, but large specimens tend to be distinguished from other Agaronia by the large spire callus and bulbous shape (most Agaronia are narrower and rather bullet-shaped).

In its natural state, the shell of Agaronia gibbosa is usually a blotched greenish color with a striped yellow band at the siphonal end, though the species also comes in an all-yellow variety.

This species is common in the shell trade and it is common for the outer layer of the shell to be polished away, revealing a brownish-black color underneath.

== Distribution ==
Populations of 'this marine species' are found in the Indian Ocean, typically near the shores of the Indian sub-continent, Thailand and Indonesia.
