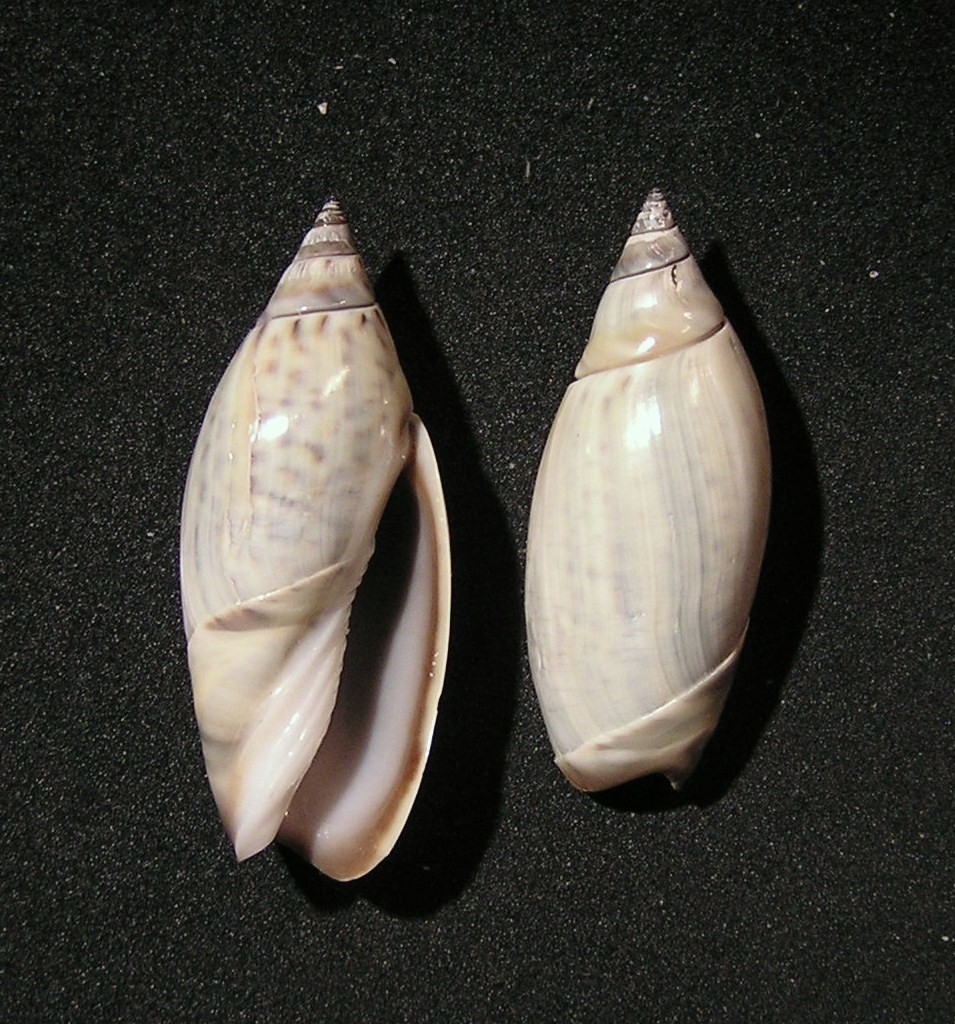
- Several views of a shell of Agaronia testacea

Scientific classification
- Kingdom: Animalia
- Phylum: Mollusca
- Class: Gastropoda
- Subclass: Caenogastropoda
- Order: Neogastropoda
- Family: Olividae
- Genus: Agaronia
- Species: A. testacea

Binomial name
- Agaronia testacea (Lamarck, 1811)

Synonyms
- Agaronia reevei Mørch, O.A.L., 1860; Agaronia (Agaronia) testacea (Lamarck, 1811)

= Agaronia testacea =

Panama false olive

Species of gastropod

Agaronia testacea, a species of sea snail with the common name Panama false olive, is a marine gastropod mollusk in the family Olividae, which are known collectively as "the olives".

== Description ==
Agaronia testacea has a muscular foot that it uses for crawling along the ocean floor, as well as two sensory tentacles. Its two eyes are located, one at the base of each tentacle. The snail's mouth is located in the center of its foot, and it feeds on algae and other small organisms that it scrapes off rocks and other surfaces using a specialized feeding structure called a radula.

Protecting the soft and fleshy body of A. testacea is the shell. The length of the shell varies between 25 mm and 66 mm. Its shape is conical and has a pointed apex or spire. The outer surface of the shell is smooth and shiny, and its color is cream or light brown with dark brown or black spots or streaks. The shell's interior is white or pale yellow.

== Distribution and habitat ==
This species is found in shallow waters along the western coast of North America, from Alaska to Baja California. It lives in rocky intertidal habitats, where it can be found clinging to rocks and other hard surfaces.

It occurs in the Pacific Ocean from the Gulf of California to Peru.

Fossils have been found in Pliocene strata in Costa Rica, Miocene strata in Colombia, Panama and Venezuela and in Quaternary strata in Mexico.
