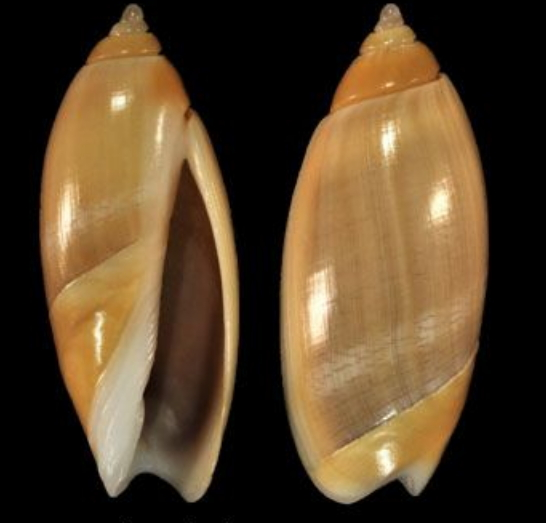
- Shell of Agaronia nica (specimen at Natural History Museum Rotterdam)

Scientific classification
- Kingdom: Animalia
- Phylum: Mollusca
- Class: Gastropoda
- Subclass: Caenogastropoda
- Order: Neogastropoda
- Family: Olividae
- Genus: Agaronia
- Species: A. nica

Binomial name
- Agaronia nica Lopez, Montonya, Lopez, 1988

= Agaronia nica =

Species of gastropod

Agaronia nica is a species of sea snail, a marine gastropod mollusk in the family Olividae, the olives.

== Description ==
The length of the shell attains 25 mm.

== Distribution ==
This species occurs in the Pacific ocean off Mexico, Costa Rica and Panama.
