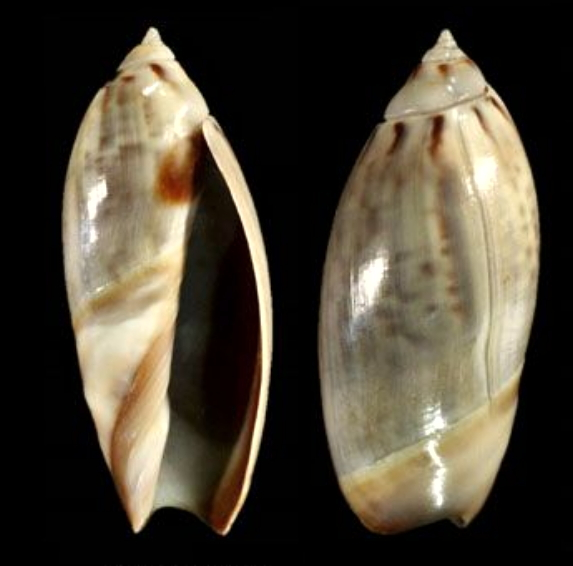
- Shell of Agaronia razetoi (specimen at Natural History Museum Rotterdam)

Scientific classification
- Kingdom: Animalia
- Phylum: Mollusca
- Class: Gastropoda
- Subclass: Caenogastropoda
- Order: Neogastropoda
- Family: Olividae
- Genus: Agaronia
- Species: A. razetoi

Binomial name
- Agaronia razetoi Terzer, 1992

= Agaronia razetoi =

Species of gastropod

Agaronia razetoi is a species of sea snail, a marine gastropod mollusk in the family Olividae, the olives.

== Distribution ==
This species occurs From Senegal to Ghana. Most specimens come from Ghana (mouth of the Whin River, Busua Beach). Also found in Ivory Coast. It seems to be an euryhaline species, commonly found in estuaries but adapted to a wide range of salinities.
