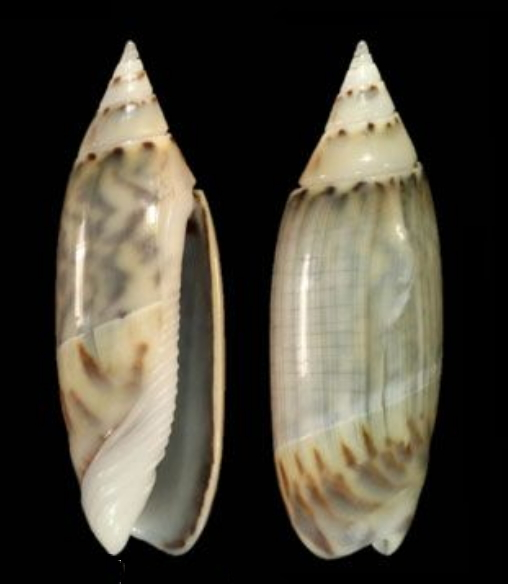
- Shell of Agaronia annotata (specimen at Natural History Museum Rotterdam)

Scientific classification
- Kingdom: Animalia
- Phylum: Mollusca
- Class: Gastropoda
- Subclass: Caenogastropoda
- Order: Neogastropoda
- Family: Olividae
- Genus: Agaronia
- Species: A. annotata

Binomial name
- Agaronia annotata (Marrat, 1871)

Synonyms
- Oliva annotata Marrat, 1871 superseded combination

= Agaronia annotata =

Species of gastropod

Agaronia annotata is a species of sea snail, a marine gastropod mollusk in the family Olividae, the olives.

== Description ==
The length of the shell attains 16.9 mm.

(Original description in Latin) The shell is lanceolate and grey, adorned with irregular longitudinal lines and spots. The spire is elongate-pyramidal, with the suture neatly punctuated in black. A divided belt is present: the posterior part is wide, with orange-yellow flames tinged with red, while the anterior part is narrowly flamed. The columella is marked by very thin plicae, with the folds of the callus separated by five twists. The aperture is blue-white inside, and the thin outer lip is stained on the interior.

== Distribution ==
This marine species occurs off the coasts from Gambia to Angola, in shallow water to a depth of 30 m.
