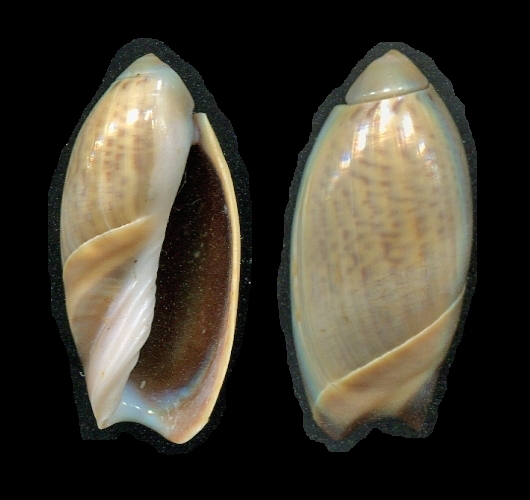
- Shell of Agaronia steeriae

Scientific classification
- Kingdom: Animalia
- Phylum: Mollusca
- Class: Gastropoda
- Subclass: Caenogastropoda
- Order: Neogastropoda
- Family: Olividae
- Genus: Agaronia
- Species: A. steeriae

Binomial name
- Agaronia steeriae (Reeve, 1850)

Synonyms
- Oliva steeriae Reeve, 1850 (original combination); Olivancillaria steeriae (Reeve, 1850)

= Agaronia steeriae =

Species of gastropod

Agaronia steeriae is a species of sea snail, a marine gastropod mollusk in the family Olividae, the olives.

== Description ==
The length of the shell varies between 25 mm and 56 mm.

== Distribution ==
This species occurs in the Atlantic Ocean off Brazil and Uruguay.
