= Agaronia bernardi =

Scientific classification
- Kingdom: Animalia
- Phylum: Mollusca
- Class: Gastropoda
- Subclass: Caenogastropoda
- Order: Neogastropoda
- Family: Olividae
- Genus: Agaronia
- Species: A. bernardi

Binomial name
- Agaronia bernardi Nolf & Hubrecht, 2024

Species of gastropod

Agaronia bernardi is a species of sea snail, a marine gastropod mollusc in the family Olividae, the olives.

== Distribution ==
This marine species occurs off the coasts of Cape Verde.
