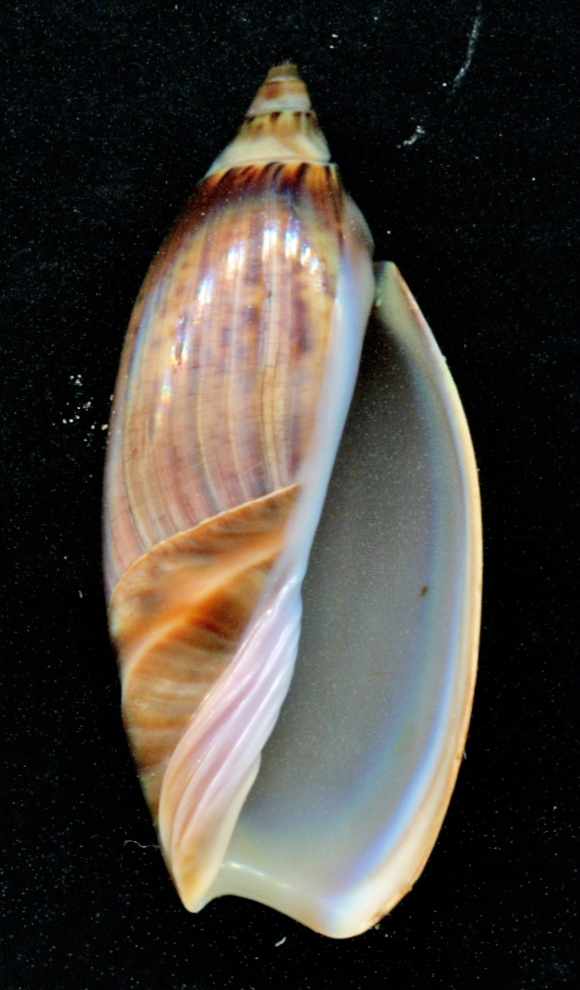
- Shell of Agaronia travassosi

Scientific classification
- Kingdom: Animalia
- Phylum: Mollusca
- Class: Gastropoda
- Subclass: Caenogastropoda
- Order: Neogastropoda
- Family: Olividae
- Genus: Agaronia
- Species: A. travassosi

Binomial name
- Agaronia travassosi Lange de Morretes, 1938

Synonyms
- Agaronia lanei Morretes, 1938 junior subjective synonym

= Agaronia travassosi =

Species of gastropod

Agaronia travassosi is a species of sea snail, a marine gastropod mollusk in the family Olividae, the olives.

== Description ==
This species attains a size of 60 mm.

== Distribution ==
Continental shelf, offshore São Paulo state, Brazil. Sometimes trawled by shrimpers at 40–70 metres depth.
