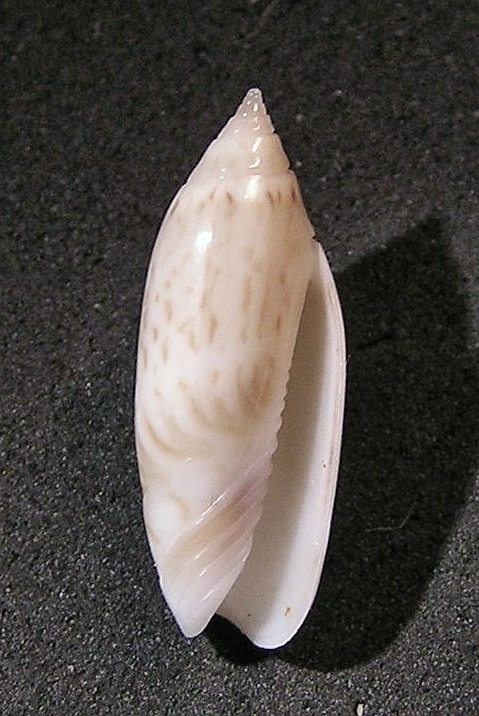
- Apertural view of a shell of Agaronia acuminata boavistensis

Scientific classification
- Kingdom: Animalia
- Phylum: Mollusca
- Class: Gastropoda
- Subclass: Caenogastropoda
- Order: Neogastropoda
- Family: Olividae
- Genus: Agaronia
- Species: A. acuminata

Binomial name
- Agaronia acuminata (Lamarck, 1811)
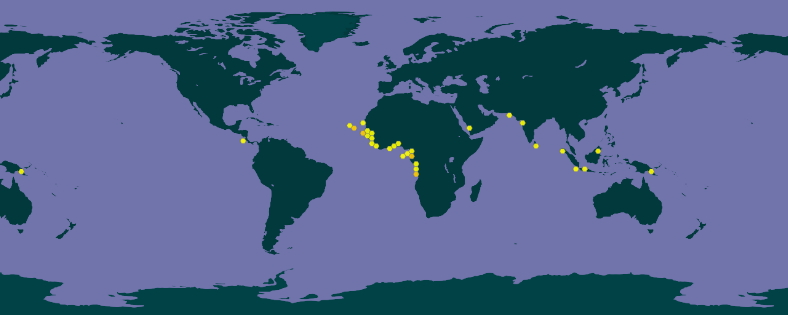

Synonyms
- Agaronia (Agaronia) subulata Reeve, L.A., 1850; Agaronia (Anazola) acuminata acuminata (Lamarck, 1811); Oliva acuminata Lamarck, 1811 (basionym)

= Agaronia acuminata =

Species of gastropod

Agaronia acuminata, common name the pointed ancilla, is a species of sea snail, a marine gastropod mollusk in the family Olividae, the olive snails.

== Subspecies ==
- Agaronia acuminata acuminata (Lamarck, 1811)
- Agaronia acuminata boavistensis Burnay & Conceicao, 1986

== Description ==
The length of the shell varies between 30 mm and 80 mm.

The smooth and glossy shell is elongate and fusiform, which means it is spindle-shaped, tapering at both ends. The spire is relatively low, compared with the overall length of the shell. The shell exhibits a range of colors: yellowish, fawn, or ash-gray, and features irregular markings, including zigzags and maculations, or is sometimes faintly nebulous with nearly obsolete markings. The suture may have fasciculations and is often reduced to a row of spots, and in some cases, it is entirely unspotted. The fasciole and fasciolar band are typically yellowish or fawn-colored, occasionally exhibiting faint, close-set, orange-red strigations. The columella is white, while the interior of the long and narrow aperture is also white, with chestnut maculations along the border of the sharp outer lip.

== Distribution ==
This species has a widespread distribution in tropical and subtropical marine environments. It occurs in the Atlantic Ocean off Gabon, Angola and West Africa; also off Costa Rica, Pakistan, Sri Lanka, Indonesia and Australia.

It is typically found in shallow waters, from the intertidal zone to depths of about 20 meters,
