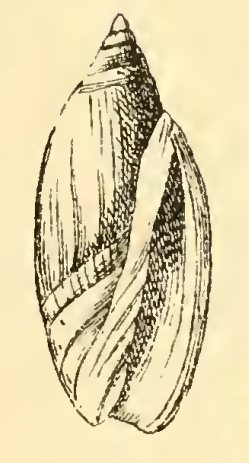
- Drawing of a shell of Agaronia ancillarioides

Scientific classification
- Kingdom: Animalia
- Phylum: Mollusca
- Class: Gastropoda
- Subclass: Caenogastropoda
- Order: Neogastropoda
- Family: Olividae
- Genus: Agaronia
- Species: A. ancillarioides

Binomial name
- Agaronia ancillarioides (Reeve, 1850)

Synonyms
- Oliva ancillarioides Reeve, 1850 ·

= Agaronia ancillarioides =

Species of gastropod

Agaronia ancillarioides is a species of sea snail, a marine gastropod mollusk in the family Olividae, the olives.

== Description ==
The length of the shell typically ranges from 30 to 60 mm.

The smooth, glossy and polished shell is elongate and spindle-shaped, tapering at both ends.

== Distribution ==
This marine species is found off the coast of Ghana.
