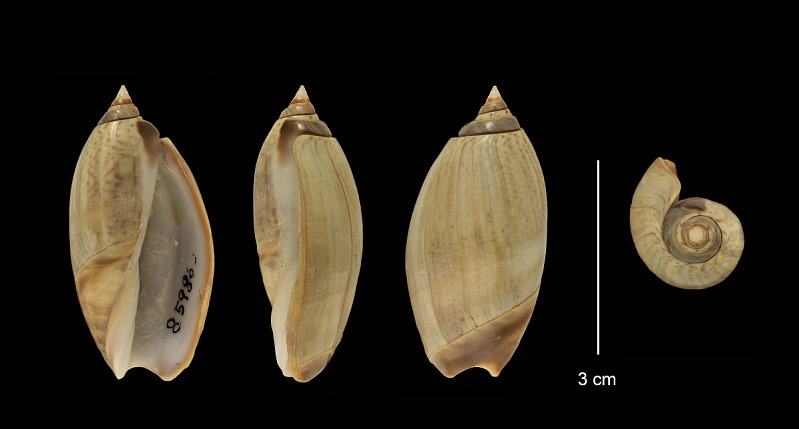
- Shell of Agaronia hilli (holotype at the Smithsonian Institution)

Scientific classification
- Kingdom: Animalia
- Phylum: Mollusca
- Class: Gastropoda
- Subclass: Caenogastropoda
- Order: Neogastropoda
- Family: Olividae
- Genus: Agaronia
- Species: A. hilli

Binomial name
- Agaronia hilli Petuch, 1987

= Agaronia hilli =

Species of gastropod

Agaronia hilli is a species of sea snail, a marine gastropod mollusk in the family Olividae, the olives.

== Description ==
(Original description) The shell is of average size for the genus, inflated and bulliform, with a small, acuminate spire. The aperture is very wide and flaring. The body whorl is smooth with a silky texture, while the spire whorls are almost entirely covered by a thick enamel deposit. The anterior one-fourth of the shell features a thick, shiny enamel deposit, sharply contrasting with the silky-textured body whorl. The columella is thin with several narrow, twisted plications.

The shell color is olive-gray, adorned with speckles and small zigzag patterns of darker gray. The spire enamel is dark brownish-black. The columella at the posterior of the aperture is marked with a large blackish-brown patch. The anterior enamel deposit is dark brown on the dorsum, fading to tan near the columella. The interior of the aperture is white, bordered with brown along the inner edge of the lip. The columella is pale tan and white, and the early whorls are white.

== Distribution ==
Locus typicus: "Off Roatan Island, Honduras."
