= Oyem Solar Power Station =

Solar farm in Oyem, Gabon

- Country: Gabon
- Location: Oyem, Woleu-Ntem Province
- Coordinates: 01°35′47″N 11°33′04″E
- Status: Proposed
- Construction began: 2023 expected
- Commission date: 2024 expected
- Owner: AMEA Power

Solar farm
- Type: Flat-panel PV

Power generation
- Nameplate capacity: 50 megawatts (67,000 hp)

Oyem Solar Power Station, is a planned 50 megawatts (67,000 hp) solar power plant in Gabon. The power station is under development by Amea Power, a subsidiary of Al Nowais Investments (ANI), based in the United Arab Emirates (UAE).

== Location ==
The power station will be located 7 kilometres (4 mi) outside the city centre of Oyem, the provincial capital of Woleu-Ntem Province, in the north of the county. Oyem is located approximately 370 kilometres (230 mi) northeast by road of Libreville, the national capital and largest city in the country.

== Overview ==
According to USAID, Gabon had an overall electrification rate of 89 percent (38 percent rural and 97 percent urban) in 2016 when national installed capacity was 443 megawatts, with 60 percent of the total coming from thermal fossil-fuel sources and 40 percent from renewable sources. By 2019, installed national capacity had increased to 750 megawatts, with more than 50 percent derived from fossil-fuels.

It is the objective of the Gabonese government to reduce dependence on fossil-fuels for its electricity needs and to increase the number of renewable energy sources and the quantity of electricity derived therefrom. Oyem Solar Farm helps to satisfy this objective. It is intended to supply energy to Woleu-Ntem Province in which it is based and to neighboring Ogooué-Ivindo Province.

== Developers ==
The power station is being developed by AMEA Power, an independent power producer (IPP), based in the UAE and active in Africa. AMEA Power also owns and operates Blitta Solar Power Station (50 megawatts), in Togo.

== See also ==
- List of power stations in Gabon
- Ayémé Solar Power Station
