= List of power stations in Gabon =

This article lists all power stations in Gabon.

== Hydroelectric ==
| Hydroelectric station | Community | Coordinates | Type | Capacity | Year completed | Name of reservoir | River |
|---|---|---|---|---|---|---|---|
| Ngoulmendjim Hydrolectric Power Station | Estuaire Province | 00°10′49″N 10°08′53″E | Rock-fill dam | 82 MW | 2028 expected | | Komo River |
| Kinguélé Aval Hydroelectric Power Station | Estuaire Province | 00°18′18″N 10°11′23″E | Rock-fill dam | 35 MW | 2024 expected | | Mbei River |
| Grand Poubara Hydroelectric Power Station | Haut-Ogooué Province | 01°46′23″S 13°33′04″E | Rock-fill dam | 160 MW | 2013 | | Ogooué River |
| FE2 Hydroelectric Power Station | Woleu-Ntem Province | 00°42′56″N 11°36′28″E | Run-of-the-river | 36 MW | 2024 expected | | Okano River |

== Thermal ==
| Thermal power station | Community | Coordinates | Fuel type | Capacity | Year completed | Name of owner | Notes |
|---|---|---|---|---|---|---|---|
| Wärtsilä Thermal Power Station | Owendo, Estuaire Province | 00°17′42″N 09°30′10″E | Natural gas | 120 MW | 2024 expected | Wärtsilä | |

== Solar ==
| Solar power station | Community | Coordinates | Fuel type | Capacity | Year completed | Name of owner | Notes |
|---|---|---|---|---|---|---|---|
| Oyem Solar Power Station | Oyem | 01°35′47″N 11°33′04″E | Solar | 50 MW | 2024 expected | AMEA Gabon Solar | |

== See also ==
- List of power stations in Africa
- List of largest power stations in the world
