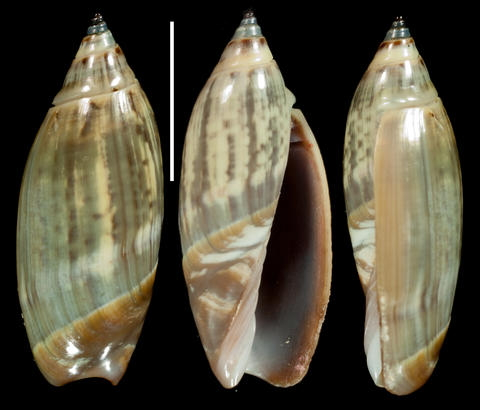
- Shell of Agaronia maltzani

Scientific classification
- Kingdom: Animalia
- Phylum: Mollusca
- Class: Gastropoda
- Subclass: Caenogastropoda
- Order: Neogastropoda
- Family: Olividae
- Genus: Agaronia
- Species: A. maltzani

Binomial name
- Agaronia maltzani (E. von Martens, 1897)

Synonyms
- Oliva hiatula var. maltzani E. von Martens, 1897 superseded rank

= Agaronia maltzani =

Species of gastropod

Agaronia maltzani is a species of sea snail, a marine gastropod mollusk in the family Olividae, the olives.

== Description ==
The length of the shell attains 32 mm.

(Original description in German) The aperture of the shell occupies about two-thirds of the shell's entire length, evenly widened downward, with a thin outer lip that does not cling upwards.

The exterior of the shell is dark bluish-grey, featuring reddish, multi-pronged streaks that often extend upwards to the suture groove. A pale yellow band is present under the suture groove on the earlier whorls and the first half of the body whorl, becoming broader near the aperture but less clearly defined. The basal band is whitish-grey with a yellow-brown band near its upper edge, somewhat spotty, displaying several fine dark spiral lines that widen towards the front near the mouth. The columellar folds are entirely liver brown, except for the lowest fold which is pure white. The inside of the aperture is grey in depth, transitioning to uniform dark brown closer to the outer edge, with a narrow whitish lip. The penultimate and third-to-last whorls feature a light yellow suture band and a blue-grey bulge in the lower visible part, while the earlier whorls are whitish with a dark dot at the outermost tip.

== Distribution ==
This marine species occurs in the Atlantic Ocean off Senegal.
