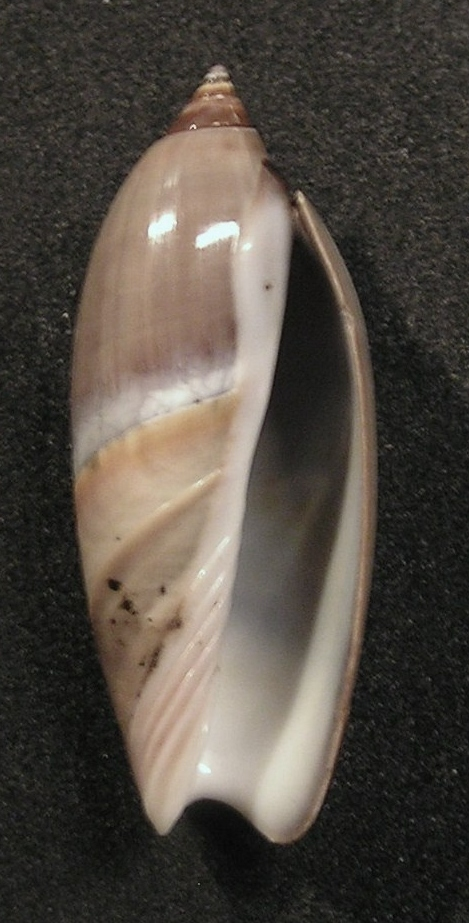
- Apertural view of a shell of Agaronia johnkochi

Scientific classification
- Kingdom: Animalia
- Phylum: Mollusca
- Class: Gastropoda
- Subclass: Caenogastropoda
- Order: Neogastropoda
- Family: Olividae
- Genus: Agaronia
- Species: A. johnkochi

Binomial name
- Agaronia johnkochi Voskuil, 1990

Synonyms
- Agaronia (Anazola) johnkochi Voskuil, 1990; Agaronia johnabbasi Cilia, 2012 ·

= Agaronia johnkochi =

Species of gastropod

Agaronia johnkochi is a species of sea snail, a marine gastropod mollusk in the family Olividae, the olives.

== Description ==
The length of the shell varies between 25 mm and 40 mm.

== Distribution ==
This marine species occurs off Java, Indonesia.
