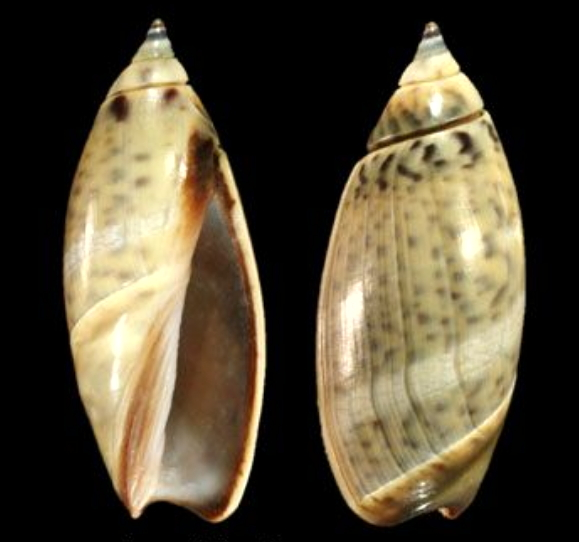
- Shell of Agaronia jesuitarum (specimen at Natural History Museum Rotterdam)

Scientific classification
- Kingdom: Animalia
- Phylum: Mollusca
- Class: Gastropoda
- Subclass: Caenogastropoda
- Order: Neogastropoda
- Family: Olividae
- Genus: Agaronia
- Species: A. jesuitarum

Binomial name
- Agaronia jesuitarum Lopez, Montonya, Lopez, 1988

= Agaronia jesuitarum =

Species of gastropod

Agaronia jesuitarum is a species of sea snail, a marine gastropod mollusk in the family Olividae, the olives.

== Description ==
Agaronia jesuitarum has a small, thin shell. Subfusiform; a high spire, straight sided. The length of the shell is about 22mm, body whorl not inflated.

== Distribution ==
This species occurs in the tropical eastern Pacific Ocean off Nicaragua, Costa Rica and Panama.
