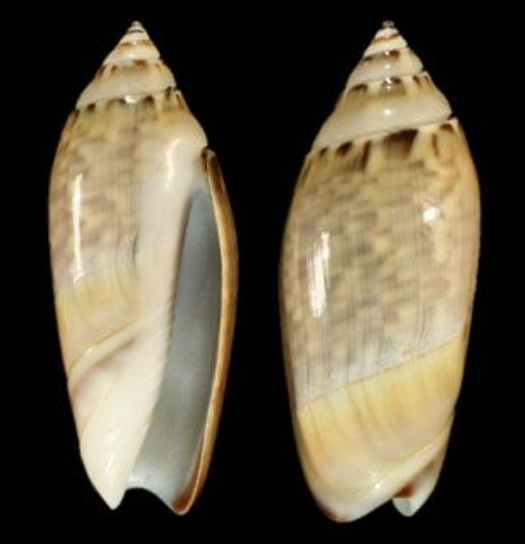
- Shell of Agaronia adamii (specimen at Natural History Museum Rotterdam)

Scientific classification
- Kingdom: Animalia
- Phylum: Mollusca
- Class: Gastropoda
- Subclass: Caenogastropoda
- Order: Neogastropoda
- Family: Olividae
- Genus: Agaronia
- Species: A. adamii

Binomial name
- Agaronia adamii Terzer, 1992

= Agaronia adamii =

Species of gastropod

Agaronia adamii is a species of sea snail, a marine gastropod mollusk in the family Olividae, the olives.

== Description ==
The length of the shell attains 28 mm.

== Distribution ==
This marine species is found off the coasts of Brunei, and the Malaysian Bornean states of Sabah and Sarawak facing the South China Sea.
