= Tchimbélé =

Waterfall in Gabon

Coordinates: 0.6170°N 10.4170°E

Tchimbélé is a waterfall in the Woleu-Ntem area of northwestern Gabon. The waterfall is fed by the Komo River and is located west of the settlement of Anzem.

A reservoir is located in the area.
