= Emerging Capital Partners =

- Type: Private
- Industry: Private Equity
- Founded: 2000; 26 years ago
- Key people: Hurley Doddy and Vincent Le Guennou (Co-CEOs)
- Products: Private Equity; Growth capital
- Website: ecpinvestments.com

Emerging Capital Partners (ECP) is a Pan-African private equity firm that has raised over US$2 billion through funds and co-investment vehicles for growth capital investing in Africa.

Founded in 2000 under the leadership of Thomas Gibian, Hurley Doddy, Vincent Le Guennou, and Carolyn Campbell, ECP has over 20 years of investing experience on the continent and is one of the largest and longest-established private equity fund managers focused on Africa, with an investment team operating in three offices on the continent.

In May 2007, when ECP closed its second fund with capital commitments of over US$520 million, the company became the first private equity group to raise over $1 billion for investment in Africa. ECP has made over 60 investments covering more than 44 African countries and has realized 48 full exits.

== Approach ==
ECP seeks to identify opportunities in sectors that benefit from the long-term structural demographic and economic shifts driving Africa's growth. ECP focuses on investments in consumer goods, financial services, telecommunications, and infrastructure sectors and has previously invested in rubber and sugar companies, restaurant chains, power and water utilities, banks, telecoms towers and PayTV. ECP is particularly active in West and East Africa and covers Africa's major hub economies from three offices on the continent:

- Francophone West Africa (Abidjan, Ivory Coast)
- East Africa (Nairobi, Kenya)
- Southern Africa (Johannesburg, South Africa)

== Environmental, Social, and Governance Practices ==
In May 2010, ECP signed the United Nations Principles for Responsible Investment (UNPRI), which provides a framework for investment professionals who believe Environmental, Social and Corporate Governance (ESG) issues affect the performance of investment portfolios and who seek sustainable approaches in the investment process.

In October 2011, ECP became the first private equity firm to sign a co-operation agreement with the International Finance Corporation (IFC) to participate in its Private Equity Africa Climate Change Investment Support (PEACCHIS) program. The program is designed to enhance sustainability best practices in Africa.
