= Okano (department) =

Coordinates: 0°47′N 11°34′E

- Department
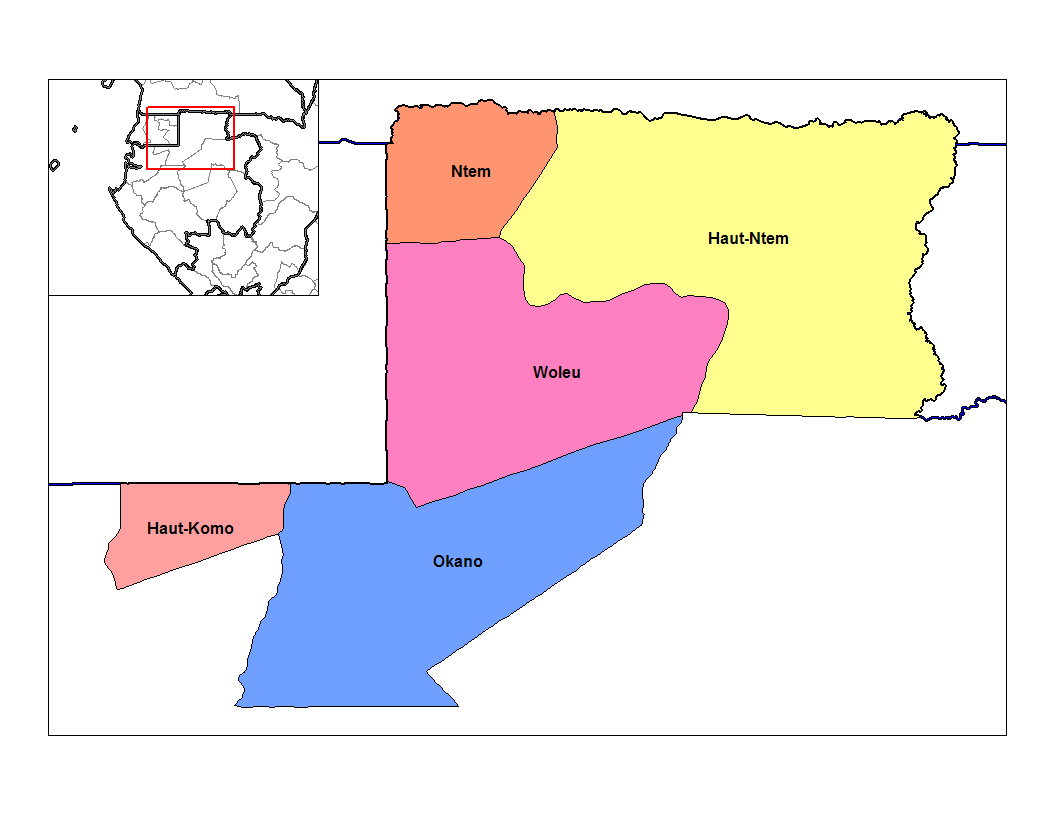
- Okano Department in the region
- Country: Gabon
- Province: Woleu-Ntem Province

Population (2013 Census)
  - Total: 16,630
- Time zone: UTC+1 (GMT +1)

Okano is a department of Woleu-Ntem Province in northern Gabon. The capital lies at Mitzic. It had a population of 16,630 in 2013.
