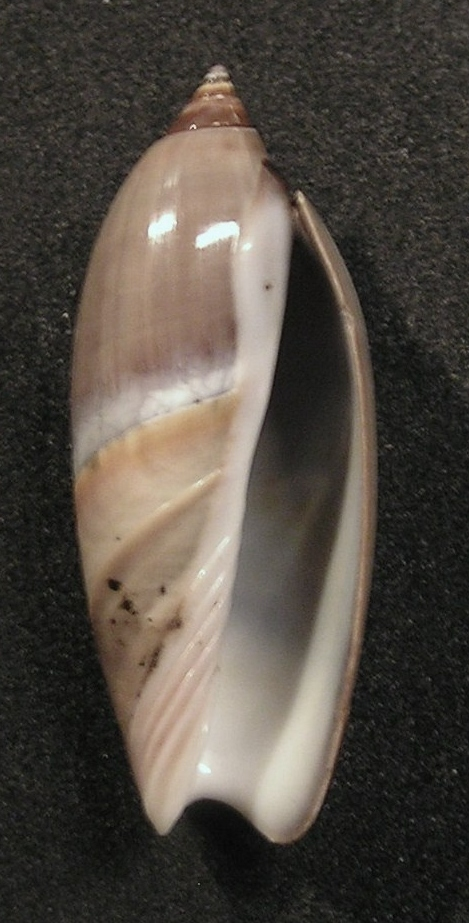
- Apertural view of a shell of Agaronia johnkochi

Scientific classification
- Kingdom: Animalia
- Phylum: Mollusca
- Class: Gastropoda
- Subclass: Caenogastropoda
- Order: Neogastropoda
- Superfamily: Olivoidea
- Family: Olividae
- Genus: Agaronia; Gray, 1839

Type species
- Voluta hiatula Gmelin, 1791
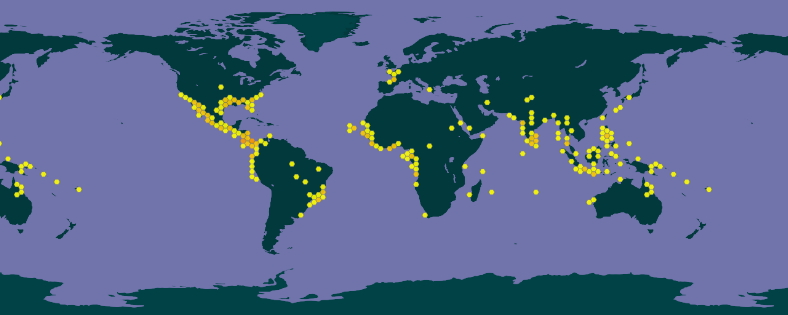

Synonyms
- Agaronia (Anazola) Gray, 1858; Anazola J. E. Gray, 1858 junior subjective synonym; Hiatula Swainson, 1831 (non Modeer, 1793); Olivancillaria (Agaronia) Gray, 1839; Scaphula (Utriculina) Gray, 1847

= Agaronia =

Genus of gastropods

Agaronia is a genus of sea snails, marine gastropod mollusks in the subfamily Agaroniinae of the family Olividae.

== Description ==
According to a 1858 description of Aragonia by zoologists Henry Adams and Arthur Adams, the snail's foot is long and ends in a pointed tip. Its mantle, a wall covering of the animal's body, have side-lobes (lateral extensions) that are "moderate" in size and "acute" (tapering to a point). The shell has an olive-like shape and its spire (the coiled part of the shell) ends in a slender point. The shell's sutures (the seam between each complete turn in the spiral) forms a channel. The aperture (the shell's opening) is wide and flares outward at the front end (opposite of the spire). The columella, the central pillar running through the axis of the shell, appears inflated and does not thicken toward the shell's tip.The columella also displays some angled folds at the front end of the shell.

== Distribution ==
Agaronia has a widespread distribution across various tropical and subtropical regions around the world. This highlights their adaptability to different marine environments.

- Western Atlantic Ocean: Eastern United States, Gulf of Mexico, Caribbean Sea, Brazil
- Eastern Pacific Ocean: Central and South America and the Galápagos Islands.
- West African Coast: from Mauritania to Angola.
- Indo-Pacific Region

== Habitat ==
Agaronia typically occurs in shallow waters (although some species may occur deeper) and on sandy and muddy substrates.

== Species ==
Species within the genus Agaronia include:

- Agaronia acuminata (Lamarck, 1811)
- Agaronia adamii Terzer, 1992
- † Agaronia alabamensis (Conrad, 1833)
- † Agaronia almaghribensis Pacaud, 2019
- Agaronia ancillarioides (Reeve, 1850)
- Agaronia annotata (Marrat, 1871)
- Agaronia bernardi Nolf & Hubrecht, 2024
- Agaronia biraghii Bernard & Nicolay, 1984
- † Agaronia bombylis (Conrad, 1833)
- † Agaronia clavula (Lamarck, 1811)
- Agaronia gibbosa (Born, 1778)
- Agaronia griseoalba (E. von Martens, 1897)
- Agaronia hiatula (Gmelin, 1791)
- Agaronia hilli Petuch, 1987
- † Agaronia inglisia K. v. W. Palmer, 1953
- † Agaronia ispidula (Linnaeus, 1758)
- Agaronia java S. K. Tan, H. E. Ng, S. Y. Chan & L. H. S. Nguang, 2019
- Agaronia jesuitarum Lopez, Montonya, Lopez, 1988
- Agaronia johnkochi Voskuil, 1990
- Agaronia junior (Duclos, 1840)
- Agaronia leonardhilli Petuch, 1987
- Agaronia lutaria (Röding, 1798)
- Agaronia maltzani (E. von Martens, 1897)
- † Agaronia media (O. Meyer, 1885)
- Agaronia nica Lopez, Montonya, Lopez, 1988
- Agaronia propatula (Conrad, 1849)
- † Agaronia pupa (J. De C. Sowerby, 1840)
- Agaronia razetoi Terzer, 1992
- Agaronia steeriae (Reeve, 1850)
- Agaronia testacea (Lamarck, 1811)
- Agaronia travassosi Lange de Morretes, 1938

Species brought into synonymy

- Agaronia johnabbasi Cilia, 2012: synonym of Agaronia johnkochi Voskuil, 1990
- Agaronia lanei Morretes, 1938 accepted as Agaronia travassosi Morretes, 1938 (junior subjective synonym)
- Agaronia murrha S. S. Berry, 1953 accepted as Agaronia griseoalba (E. von Martens, 1897) (junior subjective synonym)
- Agaronia nebulosa (Lamarck, 1811): synonym of Agaronia gibbosa (Born, 1778)
- † Agaronia plicaria (Lamarck, 1811): synonym of † Agaronia ispidula (Linnaeus, 1758)
- † Agaronia punctulifera Gabb, 1860 accepted as † Olivula staminea (Conrad, 1832) (unaccepted > junior subjective synonym)
