= Eranove =

Electricity, water, and sanitation company

- Type: Public limited company
- Industry: Amenities provider
- Founded: 2005
- Headquarters: Paris, France
- Key people: Vincent Le Guennou, Marc Albérola
- Revenue: €430 million
- Owners: Emerging Capital Partners (53.3 %)
- Number of employees: 9,000
- Website: www.eranove.com

Eranove is a French company active in the management of public services and the production of electricity and drinking water in Africa. The company was formerly known as Finagestion.

Eranove has been present in Côte d'Ivoire for several decades, in Senegal (SDE) since 1996, in the Democratic Republic of Congo since 2012 (service contract with Regideso), and in Benin since 2021 (through its subsidiary, Omilayé in the water sector in Benin). The company has also been developing projects in Mali since 2015 (Kénié Énergie Renouvelable), Gabon (Louetsi Hydro, Asokh Energy, Orélo), Madagascar (Sahofika), and Togo (Kékéli Efficient Power). It generated revenues of €576 million in 2017.

Eranove operates at a capacity of over 1,250 MW, employs over 8,700 people, and serves 1.9 million customers for electricity, 1.8 million for water, and 470,000 for sanitation. The majority shareholder of the Eranove Group is ECP Finagestion FII S.a.r.l., affiliated with Emerging Capital Partners, a private equity firm.

== History ==
The board of directors decided to rename Finagestion "Eranove" in July 2014 following a consultative process within the group's subsidiaries.

Prior to renaming, between 2005 and 2006, the Bouygues Group sold its public services subsidiary, Saur, while retaining its African and Italian assets. The African assets were housed in Finagestion, a holding company 100% owned by the Bouygues Group.

Between July 2008 and October 2009, ECP FII Finagestion S.a.r.l., an affiliate of Emerging Capital Partners (ECP), gradually acquired a 60% stake in this entity from Bouygues. ECP FII Finagestion S.a.r.l. currently owns 53.3% of the Eranove group. ECP gradually transformed Eranove (at the time Finagestion) into a pan-African industrial platform.

Since 1960, the Eranove Group has been present in Côte d'Ivoire (Société de Distribution d'Eau de Côte d'Ivoire; Compagnie Ivoirienne d'électricité; Compagnie Ivoirienne de Production d'électricité; Awale). It began operations in Senegal in 1996 (Sénégalaise des Eaux). Since 2013, it has been active in the Democratic Republic of Congo through a service contract with the Régidéso. The group is also developing other projects across Africa, notably in Mali (Kenié Renewable Energy), Gabon (Louetsi Hydro, Asokh Energy, Orélo), Madagascar (Sahofika), Côte d'Ivoire (Atinkou and Cavally), and Togo (Kékéli Efficient Power).

In the summer of 2015, the 18.6% still held by Bouygues were sold to French insurance company AXA.

== Shareholder distribution ==
Shareholder	Percentage held
ECP	53.3
AXA Group subsidiaries	18.6
Private African investors	9.3
Employee shareholders	8.4
Managers	6.5
CNPS CI	4.7

== Operations (through affiliates and service contracts) ==
=== CIPREL (Compagnie ivoirienne de production d'électricité) ===
A power generation company operating in Côte d'Ivoire since 1994, Compagnie Ivoirienne de Production d'Electricité (CIPREL) has a thermal power plant consisting of seven combustion turbines, which use natural gas extracted off the Ivorian coast as their main fuel, as well as a steam turbine.

CIPREL operates a concession contract, running until 2035, with the State of Côte d'Ivoire. It is 83.3% owned by Eranove.

The entire CIPREL perimeter is HSE certified: ISO 9001, OHSAS 18001, ISO 14001. CIPREL has reached the confirmed stage of the ISO 26 000 standard for its commitment to corporate social responsibility (CSR) throughout its scope.

==== History ====
The company began its activities in March 1995 with CIPREL I (100 MW). The second 111 MW unit (CIPREL II) was commissioned in June 1997. Then, in December 2009, 111 MW (CIPREL III) were commissioned, bringing the total production capacity to 321 MW.

In December 2011, CIPREL was entrusted with a new extension to support Côte d'Ivoire's economic recovery, CIPREL IV.

CIPREL IV represents a total investment (including financing) of CFAF 222.9 billion (€339.8 million) for an additional 222 MW using combined cycle technology. This fourth unit consists of a new 111 MW combustion turbine commissioned on 1 January 2014 and a 111 MW steam turbine. The steam turbine adds 111 MW of production capacity without additional natural gas consumption and thus avoids the release into the atmosphere of 500,000 tons of CO_{2} per year, while optimizing the cost of electricity production through improved thermal efficiency.

Auxiliary works were completed at the end of 2015, making CIPREL IV's the largest gas-fired power plant in Côte d'Ivoire with a total production capacity of 556 MW and an estimated total annual production of 3,810 GWh.

=== CIE (Compagnie ivoirienne d’électricité) ===
CIE (Compagnie Ivoirienne d'Électricité) is a private operator linked to the State of Côte d'Ivoire by a concession agreement since 1990 to operate production, transmission and distribution facilities, and market, import and export on behalf of the Ivorian State of electricity throughout the national territory and in the wider region. CIE serves 1.9 million customers, operates a production capacity of 704 MW as well as 50,000 km of the electricity grid.

Since the end of 2014, CIE has been implementing, in collaboration with the ministry, a program to facilitate access to electricity for a large number of people, the Electricity for All Program (Programme Électricité pour Tous - PEPT). It has connected 359,000 households to electricity.

CIE is listed on the Bourse régionale des valeurs mobilières (BRVM). It was rated AA+ (long-term) by the financial rating agency Bloomfield Investment in 2016 and is 55.53% owned by Eranove. The scope of CIE's interconnected production, energy movements, and transport are HSE certified according to ISO and OHSAS standards and have reached the confirmed stage according to ISO 26 000.

Through CIE, the Eranove Group also operates the Centre des Métiers de l'Éléctricité (CME), a training center specializing in electricity and management based in Bingerville, near Abidjan. The CME has obtained the HR Excellence certification and the "center of excellence" label from the Association of Power Utilities of Africa (APUA). In 2017, in addition to the 230 students in the BTS/DUT cycle, 4,416 people were enrolled in training and 220 in initial training. In May 2018, the CME signed a partnership agreement with the Conservatoire National des Arts et Métiers (CNAM) to deliver the first French professional bachelor's degree of this kind in West Africa.

=== SODECI (Société de distribution d’eau de la Côte d'Ivoire) ===
Created in 1960 as the first privatized water distribution company in Africa, SODECI (Société de distribution d’eau de la Côte d'Ivoire [Côte d'Ivoire Water Distribution Company]) produces, transports and distributes clean drinking water in the urban areas of Côte d'Ivoire. Since 1999, SODECI also operates and maintains sanitation facilities for the city of Abidjan. SODECI provides services to 1.1 million customers for water, while providing sanitation to 470,000 customers. SODECI operates through a lease contract.

46.07% owned by Eranove, SODECI is a company listed on the Regional Transferable Securities Exchange (BRVM). SODECI was rated AA− (long-term) and A1− (short term by the financial rating agency Bloomfield Investments in 2016). SODECI was the first private company in the public infrastructure space in Africa to be certified ISO 9001.

=== SDE (Sénégalaise des eaux) ===
SDE, the Senegalese water company, has been producing, transporting, and distributing drinking water in Senegal's main cities since 1996. SDE's lease contract with the State of Senegal has been renewed three times since 1996.

Between 1996 and 2017, the rate of access to the service increased from 80% to 98%, and the number of customers more than doubled (from 241,167 to 743,859). Network efficiency increased by more than 10 points (1%). These performances have contributed to Senegal's achievement of the Millennium Development Goals (MDGs) in the field of drinking water services, along with other actors in the urban water sector. SDE supplies consumers through individual connections and standpipes. It had 1209 employees at the end of 2017.

SDE is a member of the African Water Association (AAE), the International Water Association (IWA), the World Federation of Private Water Operators (AQUAFED) and the World Water Council (WWC). In 2018, SDE obtained the "Water Utility of the Year" award from African Utility Week. The SDE is QSE certified throughout its scope: ISO 9001, OHSAS 18001, ISO 14001. SDE has reached the exemplary stage of the ISO 26 000 standard for its commitment to corporate social responsibility (CSR).

Eranove and SDE, following an international bidding process, signed a three-year service contract, renewed in 2017, with REGIDESO (Democratic Republic of Congo), financed by the World Bank.

=== Smart Energy Côte d'Ivoire ===
An affiliate of CIE and the Eranove Group created in 2017, Smart Energy helps businesses with energy efficiency.

=== AWALE ===
AWALE (affiliate of CIE and the Eranove Group) provides high-speed data transmission capacity via the electrical network of Côte d'Ivoire. In 2010, AWALE signed a 20-year agreement with Côte d'Ivoire to construct and operate communication networks via fiber optic lines and on-line electric currents. AWALE is 77.13% owned by Eranove (Eranove + CIE).

== Projects under exclusive development ==
=== Kékéli Efficient Power ===
On October 23, 2018, the Republic of Togo and the Eranove Group signed a concession agreement for an electric power plant of 65 MW. The concession agreement for the production of electricity includes design, financing, construction, commissioning, operation and maintenance of an electric power plant located in the port district of Lomé.

=== Atinkou ===
On September 5, 2016, the Eranove Group signed an agreement protocol with Côte d'Ivoire for the financing, design, construction, operation, and maintenance of a thermal combined cycle power plant of 390 MW, followed by the signing of a concession agreement on 19 December 2018. The Atinkou power plant will use natural gas as its main fuel and will be located on the edge of Abidjan.

=== Orélo ===
In October 2018, the signing of the concession agreement for the Orélo water treatment plant followed the agreement protocol signed in March 2017 by the Republic of Gabon, the FGIS, and the Eranove Group. This contract deals with the financing, design, construction, operation, and maintenance of a new clean drinking water production plant with a production capacity of 140,000 m3 per day, situated in the Estuaire Province, more specifically in the district of Komo-Kango.

=== Kenié Énergie Renouvelable ===
Through its affiliate Kénié Énergie Renouvelable (Kénié Renewable Energy), the Eranove Group signed on June 18, 2015, with the government of the Republic of Mali a concession agreement with a duration of 30 years for the financing, design, construction and operation of the 42MW Kénié hydroelectric power plant, 35 km east of Bamako in Baguinéda on the Niger River.

=== Asokh Energy ===
On 21 October 2016, the Eranove Group and the Fonds Gabonais d'Investissements Stratégiques (FGIS) signed a concession contract with the Gabonese State for the design, financing, construction and operation of the Asokh Energy hydroelectric power plant (Ngoulmendjim site, 73 MW) on 26 October 2018. This hydroelectric power plant, located on the Komo River, is going to supply Libreville.

=== Louetsi Energy ===
On 21 October 2016, the Eranove group and the Fonds Gabonais d'Investissements Stratégiques (FGIS) signed a concession contract with the Gabonese State for the design, financing, construction and operation of the Louetsi Hydro (15 MW) hydroelectric power plant and on 26 October 2018, the contract for the sale of electricity. This run-of-river hydroelectric power plant, located 450 km from the capital on the Louetsi River, on the Dibwangui site, is dedicated to supplying the southwestern part of the country.

=== Cavally ===
In 2014, the Eranove Group signed an agreement protocol related to hydroelectric planning for the Cavally River. This protocol commits Eranove to the design, financing, construction and operation of hydroelectric facilities on the Cavally River, within the framework of a BOO (Build-Own-Operate) contract.

=== Sahofika ===
A consortium made up of the Eranove, Eiffage and Themis Groups on December 2, 2016, signed a project agreement with the Republic of Madagascar for the construction and operation of a 200 MW capacity hydroelectric power plant.

=== RSE ===
Through its subsidiaries, the group is committed to all the facets of ISO 26 000 CSR and to ISO 9001 quality, OHSAS 18001 safety and ISO 1400160 environmental certification.
