= Mbeya River =

River of Gabon and Equatorial Guinea

Coordinates: 0.327°N 10.208°E

The Mbeya (also Mbé, Mbei: French: Rivière Mbeya, Spanish: Río Mbeya) is a river of Gabon and Equatorial Guinea. It is a tributary of the Komo River. The watershed covers 6,940 square kilometres (2,680 sq mi), 93% of which is in Gabon (including parts of Crystal Mountains National Park) and the remainder in Equatorial Guinea. The Gabonese power and water utility SEEG, a subsidiary of Veolia, operates two hydroelectric dams on the river at Kinguélé (58 MW) and Tchimbélé (69 MW).
