= Komo River =

River of Equatorial Guinea and Gabon

Coordinates: 0°10′13″N 10°05′40″E

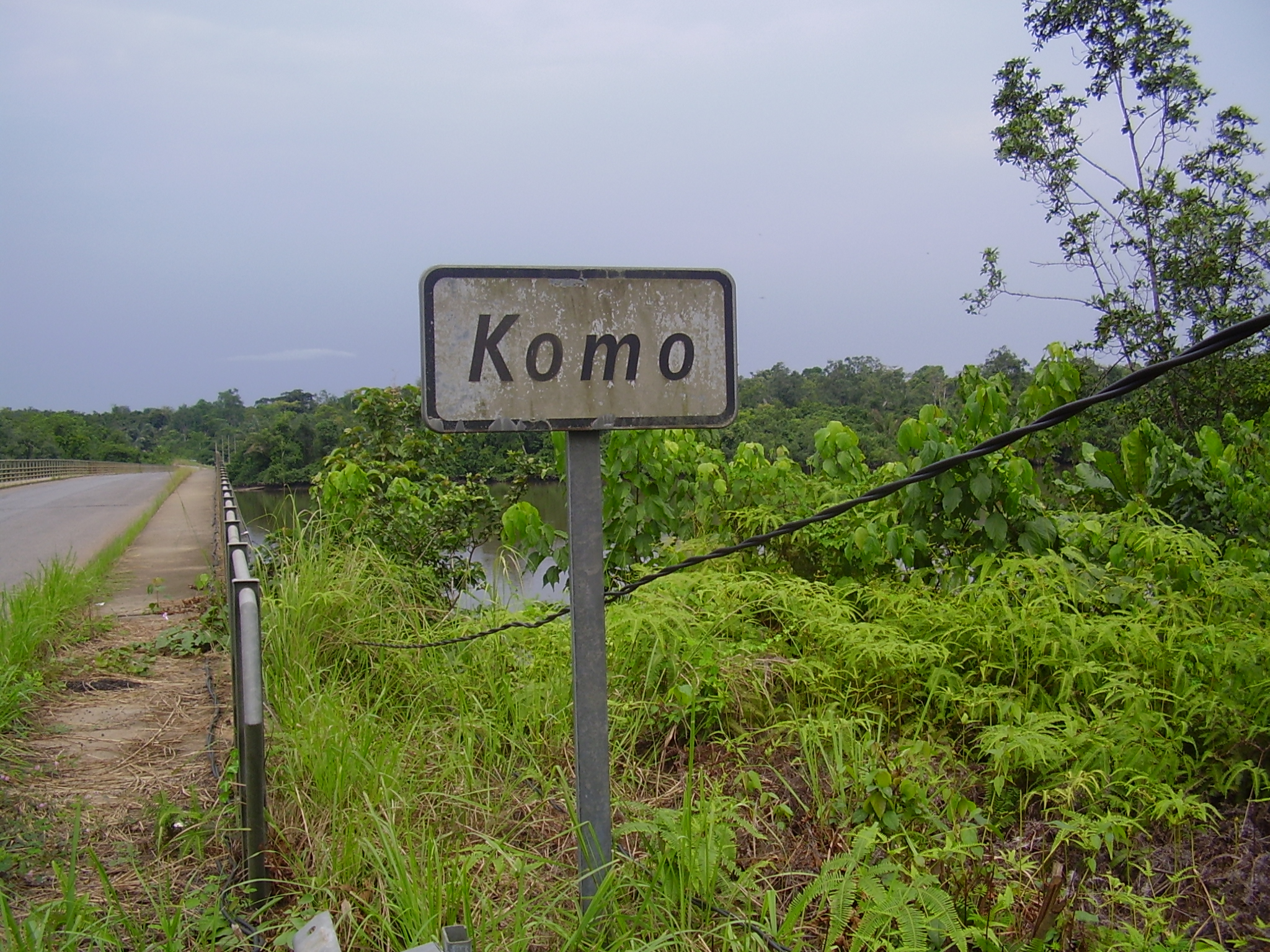
Sign at a bridge of the river Komo

The Komo (French: Rivière Komo, Spanish: Río Komo) is a river of Equatorial Guinea and Gabon. It flows for 230 kilometres (140 mi).

It rises in Equatorial Guinea in the southwestern part of the Woleu-Ntem plateau. However much of its watershed is in the territory of Gabon. The largest tributary of the River Komo is the Mbeya River. Its course is disturbed by geological barriers that produce waterfalls as those at Tchimbélé and Kinguélé. They are potential hydroelectric power sources for Libreville.
