= Mzembela =

- Location in Malawi
- Coordinates: 13°55′S 34°28′E
- Country: Malawi
- Region: Central Region
- District: Salima District

Mzembela is a village in central Malawi 4.9 miles north-west of Chipoka. It is located in Salima District in the Central Region.

Nearby towns and villages include Kalombola (1.0 nm), Lowe (1.0 nm), Mazenjele (1.0 nm), Katumba (1.4 nm), Luwagala (1.9 nm) and Ndindi (3.5 nm).
