= Chassot =

Chassot (French: [ʃaso]) is a surname. Notable people with the surname include:

- Carl Chassot de Florencourt (1756–1790), German entomologist
- Frédéric Chassot (born 1969), Swiss footballer
- Isabelle Chassot (born 1965), Swiss politician
- René Chassot (1891–1922), French racing cyclist

== See also ==
- Chayote
- Chasseur
- Chaseta
