= Mkangawi =

- Location in Malawi
- Coordinates: 13°55′S 34°28′E
- Country: Malawi
- Region: Central Region
- District: Salima District
- Elevation: 698 m (2,290 ft)

Mkangawi is a village in central Malawi 4.9 miles north-west of Chipoka. It is located in Salima District in the Central Region.

Nearby towns and villages include Kalombola (1.0 nm), Lowe (1.0 nm), Mazenjele (1.0 nm), Katumba (1.4 nm), Kalombola (1.4 nm), Luwagala (1.9 nm) and Ndindi (3.5 nm).
