= Moabi Airport =

Airport in Gabon

Moabi Airport Aéroport Moabi
- IATA: MGX; ICAO: FOGI

Summary
- Serves: Moabi
- Elevation AMSL: 787 ft / 240 m
- Coordinates: 2°27′15″S 10°56′00″E

Map
- Location in Gabon

Runways
Direction	Length		Surface
Direction	m	ft	Surface
12/30	1,100	3,609	Grass
- Sources: Bing Maps GCM

Moabi Airport (French: Aéroport Moabi) (IATA: FOGI, ICAO: MGX) is an airport serving the town of Moabi in the Nyanga Province of Gabon.

== See also ==
- List of airports in Gabon
- Transport in Gabon
