= Tsogni =

- Town
- Location in Gabon
- Coordinates: 2°48′S 10°7′E
- Country: Gabon
- Province: Nyanga Province
- Department: Basse-Banio Department

Population (1993)
  - Total: 7,226
- Time zone: UTC+1 (WAT)

Tsogni is a town in Nyanga Province in the south of Gabon. It is the second largest city in the province and twelfth largest city in the country. In 1993 it had a population of 7,226 and in 2012 has an estimated population of 13,725.
