= Antoine Mboumbou Miyakou =

Gabonese politician (1937–2024)

Antoine de Padoue Mboumbou Miyakou (12 March 1937 – 20 April 2024) was a Gabonese politician who served in the government of Gabon from 1982 to 2006 and was President of the Economic and Social Council of Gabon from 2006 to 2012. He also served as a Vice-President of the Gabonese Democratic Party (PDG).

== Life and career ==
Mboumbou Miyakou was born on 12 March 1937 in Mayumba, located in the south of Gabon. He was Prefect of Haut-Ogooué Province from January 1974 to December 1975 and Governor of Haut-Ogooué Province from December 1975 to October 1981; he was then appointed to the government as a Secretary of State in 1982. Subsequently, he was promoted to the rank of Minister-Delegate, serving under the Minister of State for Territorial Administration and Local Collectivities. He was then Minister-Delegate under the Third Deputy Prime Minister from 1987 to 1988 and Minister-Delegate under the Second Deputy Prime Minister from 1988 to 1990.

In 1990, Mboumbou Miyakou was promoted to the position of Minister of Territorial Administration and Local Collectivities. As Minister of Territorial Administration and Chairman of the Electoral Commission, he played an important role in the December 1993 presidential election, in which President Omar Bongo was controversially re-elected. His ministerial portfolio was altered in March 1994, when he was appointed Minister of the Interior, Local Collectivities, and Mobile Security. He was then moved to the position of Minister of Transport, Merchant Marine, and Fishing, in charge of Tourism and the National Parks, in November 1994. He was promoted to the position of Minister of State for the Interior, Public Security, and Decentralization in 1995.

Mboumbou Miyakou became Mayor of Ndindi in 1996; he was also elected to the National Assembly as a PDG candidate in Nyanga Province in the December 1996 parliamentary election, and again in the December 2001 parliamentary election. He remained in the government after each of those elections, continuing to serve as Minister of State for the Interior, Public Security, and Decentralization until he was moved to the post of Deputy Prime Minister for Urban Affairs on 27 January 2002. He was instead appointed Deputy Prime Minister for Relations with Parliament, in charge of the Missions and Follow-up of Interministerial Commissions, on 3 June 2005.

President Bongo appointed Mboumbou Miyakou as President of the Economic and Social Council on 19 January 2006. He remained in that post until July 2012, when he was succeeded by Paul Biyoghé Mba. On 10 June 2014, he was appointed Political Adviser to the President, Ali Bongo.

Mboumbou Miyakou died on 20 April 2024, at the age of 87.
