= Hotel Métropole, Matadi =

Coordinates: 5.821434°S 13.460002°E

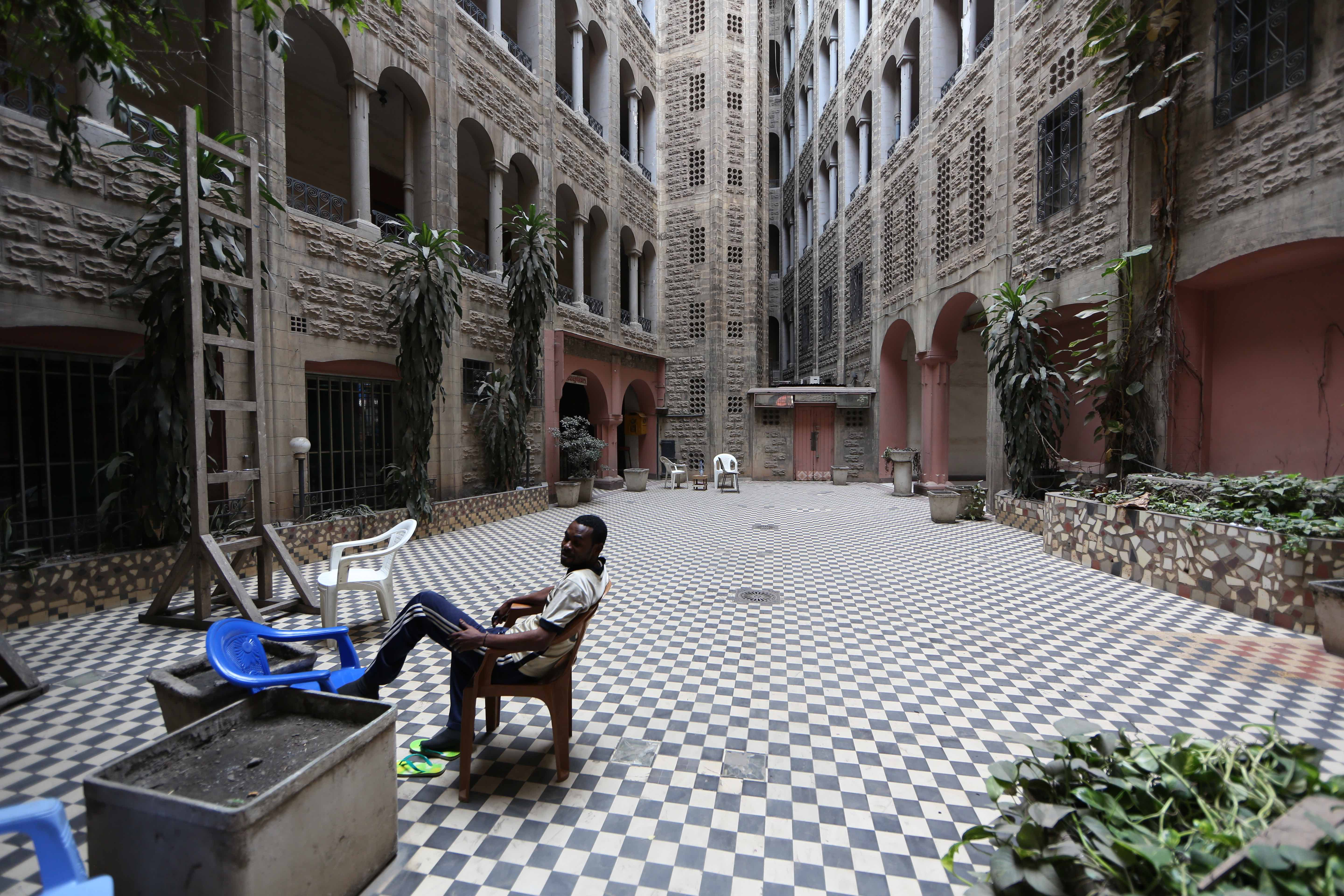
- View over the courtyard of Hotel Métropole
- Interactive map of the Hotel Métropole, Matadi area

General information
- Location: Matadi, Kongo Central, Democratic Republic of Congo, 2 Avenue Kinkanda
- Opening: 1930

Design and construction
- Architect: Ernest Callebout

Hôtel Métropole is a hotel in Matadi, Democratic Republic of Congo. Constructed in a Gothic Revival style by Belgian architect Ernest Callebout, it first opened in 1930.

== History ==
Construction of the Hôtel Métropole began in the late 1920s as part of efforts to modernize Matadi, which served as the primary maritime gateway to the Congo. Intended to accommodate colonial administrators, businessmen, and international visitors, the hotel quickly became one of the most prestigious establishments in the city.

== Architecture ==
The building is notable for its Gothic Revival design, inspired by European palaces and cathedrals. Contemporary guidebooks described the structure as resembling a Florentine palazzo, highlighting its contrast with the surrounding tropical environment. Its grand façade, ornamented arches, and imposing proportions reflected European architectural influence in Central Africa.

== Legacy ==
The Hôtel Métropole played a central role in Matadi’s social and political life throughout the mid-20th century. Although its prominence has declined in recent decades, the hotel remains an architectural landmark and a symbol of the city’s colonial past.

== Architect ==
The hotel was designed by Ernest Callebout (1887–1952), a Belgian architect, sculptor, and etcher. Callebout was known for combining modernist elements with historical European styles. His works include residential buildings in Bruges as well as Masonic lodges and cultural institutions in Belgium.
