= Mvuzi =

A commune in the town of Matadi in the Democratic Republic of Congo.

Mvuzi is a commune of the city of Matadi in the Democratic Republic of the Congo.
