= Nyanga Province =

Province of Gabon

Nyanga
- Province
- Flag Coat of arms

- Nyanga Province in Gabon
- Coordinates: 3°0′S 11°0′E
- Country: Gabon
- Capital: Tchibanga

Area
  - Total: 21,285 km^{2} (8,218 sq mi)

Population (2013 census)
  - Total: 52,854
  - Density: 2.4832/km^{2} (6.4313/sq mi)
- HDI (2017): 0.637 medium

Nyanga is the southernmost of Gabon's nine provinces. The provincial capital is Tchibanga, which had a total of 31,294 inhabitants in 2013 (more than the half of the province population). Nyanga is the least populated province of the nine and the other least developed, besides Ogooué-Ivindo. It is bordered by Ogooué-Maritime in the northwest, Ngounié in the north, and the Congo to the south (Kouilou Region) and east (Niari Region). The Atlantic Ocean—the lowest point in both Gabon and Nyanga Province—borders it in the west.

== Departments ==
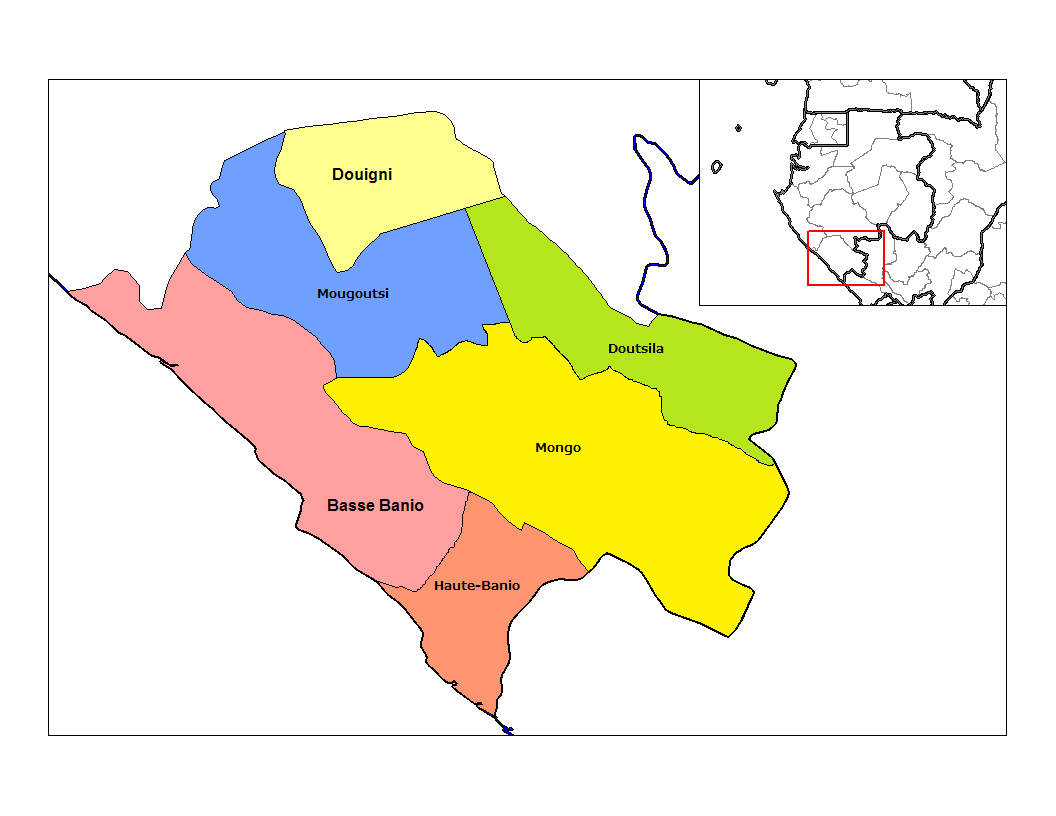
Departments of Nyanga

Nyanga is divided into 6 departments:

- Basse-Banio Department (Mayumba)
- Douigni Department (Moabi)
- Doutsila Department (Mabanda)
- Haute-Banio Department (Ndindi)
- Mongo Department (Moulengui-Binza)
- Mougoutsi Department (Tchibanga)

== Statistics ==
- Area: 21,285 km²
- 2-letter abbreviation/HASC: GA-NY
- ISO 3166-2: GA-05
- Population (2013): 52,854

== Historical population figures ==
| Year | Population | Change | Density |
|---|---|---|---|
| 1980 | 52,300 | – | 2.46/km² |
| 1993 | 39,430 | −12,870/−24.61% | 1.85/km² |

The population in 1991 was almost a quarter less than the 1981 population; the population density in the mid to late 1980s dropped below 2/km².

== Places ==
=== B–C ===
| Place | Latitude | Longitude | Altitude |
|---|---|---|---|
| Bana | 3.45 S | 10.667 E | 0 m |
| Banda Namba | 3.833 S | 11.033 E | 362 m |
| Bayadi | 3.183 S | 11.4 E | 331 m |
| Bende Passi Mogno | 3 S | 10 E | 7 m |
| Benga | 2.91667 S | 11.533 E | 470 m |
| Beni Bantou | 2.85 S | 10.2833 E | 1 m |
| Bibonga | 2 S | 10 E | 1 m |
| Bibonga | 3.2 S | 11.41667 E | 324 m |
| Bibora | 3.21667 S | 11.45 E | 342 m |
| Biello | 3.15 S | 11.33 E | 393 m |
| Bignendzi | 2.41667 S | 10.95 E | 226 m |
| Bihindou | 2.55 S | 11.1833 E | 527 m |
| Bikamba | 3.35 S | 10.7 E | 69 m |
| Bikendzi | 2.667 S | 11.1 E | 383 m |
| Bila Gouambi | 2.3667 S | 11.033 E | 304 m |
| Bilanga | 3.367 S | 10.683 E | 23 m |
| Bilemba | 2.6167 S | 11.3 E | 674 m |
| Bilengui | 2.9 S | 10.483 E | 27 m |
| Bilombi | 2.9167 S | 11.25 E | 302 m |
| Bilombika Keri | 2.25 S | 11.01667 E | 289 m |
| Birenki | 2.6 S | 10.85 E | 128 m |
| Birouki | 2.433 S | 11.05 E | 308 m |
| Bivanga | 2.883 S | 11.133 E | 189 m |
| Bouda | 2.833 S | 10.3 E | 1 m |
| Boudiombi | 3.0833 S | 11.633 E | 427 m |
| Bouggou | 3.75 S | 11.2 E | 217 m |
| Bougoulou | 2.45 S | 10.733 E | 155 m |
| Boukagni | 3.21667 S | 11.433 E | 355 m |
| Boukena Boumounou | 3.76667 S | 11.01667 E | 29 m |
| Boulembi | 2.6167 S | 10.8667 E | 126 m |
| Bouneni | 2.85 S | 11.3 E | 409 m |
| Boungou Bouliba | 2.75 S | 11.1667 E | 370 m |
| Bouyanga | 2.61667 S | 11.233 E | 625 m |
| Caye | 2.91667 S | 11.5 E | 480 m |

=== D–F ===
| Place | Latitude | Longitude | Altitude |
|---|---|---|---|
| Dende | 3 S | 10 E | 7 m |
| Dende | 3.7667 S | 11.15 E | 7 m |
| Dilienga | 2.7667 S | 10.4 E | 5 m |
| Dinguilila | 2.5833 S | 11.15 E | 502 m |
| Disofou | 2.883 S | 10.4667 E | 27 m |
| Dissala | 2.31667 S | 10.61667 E | 87 m |
| Dissiala | 2.31667 S | 11.0833 E | 333 m |
| Ditoumba Nzambi | 3.2667 S | 10.6833 E | 157 m |
| Divangui | 2 S | 11 E | 458 m |
| Divevi | 2.9833 S | 11.7833 E | 674 m |
| Diveya | 2.5667 S | 11.1667 E | 496 m |
| Divina | 2.4833 S | 10.91667 E | 199 m |
| Divoko | 2.6 S | 10.95 E | 197 m |
| Djaouri | 2.8833 S | 11.45 E | 504 m |
| Djema | 2.933 S | 10.35 E | 1 m |
| Dola | 3.0833 S | 10.6 E | 53 m |
| Douanga | 3 S | 10.3833 E | 6 m |
| Doubagni | 2.75 S | 10.833 E | 137 m |
| Doubogno | 2.81667 S | 11.05 E | 219 m |
| Douboumo | 3.21667 S | 10.533 E | 2 m |
| Doufouma | 2.3833 S | 11 E | 271 m |
| Dougalou | 3.133 S | 11.71667 E | 336 m |
| Dougandou I | 2.71667 S | 10.95 E | 230 m |
| Dougandou II | 2.71667 S | 10.933 E | 218 m |
| Dougou Mamba | 2.933 S | 10.4833 E | 23 m |
| Douigny | 3.1 S | 10.7833 E | 347 m |
| Doukaki | 2.91667 S | 11.01667 E | 191 m |
| Doukanga | 2 S | 11 E | 700 m |
| Doukanga | 2.91667 S | 11.833 E | 663 m |
| Doukendema | 2.3 S | 11.0667 E | 320 m |
| Doukoumou | 2.9 S | 11.15 E | 201 m |
| Douli | 3.3 S | 11.65 E | 269 m |
| Doungou | 2.7833 S | 10.41667 E | 8 m |
| Dounguila | 2.7 S | 11.5 E | 717 m |
| Dounvou | 3.3833 S | 10.71667 E | 52 m |
| Doussoundzi | 2.6833 S | 11.1667 E | 488 m |
| Douzanza | 2.7667 S | 11.5667 E | 634 m |
| Dovoyi | 3.01667 S | 11.1667 E | 332 m |
| Foundou Nzambi | 2.433 S | 10.9667 E | 232 m |

=== G–I ===
| Place | Latitude | Longitude | Altitude |
|---|---|---|---|
| Gnali | 2.5667 S | 11.3 E | 688 m |
| Gobini | 3.033 S | 10.45 E | 41 m |
| Gondzi | 2.9667 S | 11.51667 E | 409 m |
| Goumbou | 3.233 S | 10.6833 E | 201 m |
| Iantsi | 3.15 S | 11.31667 E | 439 m |
| Ibanga | 2 S | 10 E | 87 m |
| Ibanga | 2 S | 11 E | 435 m |
| Ibanga | 2.95 S | 11.31667 E | 370 m |
| Idemba | 3.35 S | 10.7 E | 69 m |
| Igala | 2.5667 S | 11.3 E | 688 m |
| Ikeri Issiana | 2.7833 S | 11.0833 E | 294 m |
| Ikoli | 3.133 S | 11.33 E | 306 m |
| Ileka | 2.433 S | 10.9667 E | 232 m |
| Ilendo | 3.2667 S | 11.533 E | 317 m |
| Iloba Songui | 2.633 S | 11.21667 E | 606 m |
| Iloga Magounga | 2.45 S | 11.1 E | 339 m |
| Ilogo | 2.6833 S | 11.1667 E | 488 m |
| Iloumi Ilongo Diboura | 2.8 S | 11.0833 E | 272 m |
| Imboko | 2.9667 S | 11.0833 E | 255 m |
| Inanga | 2.81667 S | 10.31667 E | 1 m |
| Ineni Magno | 2.4 S | 11.1667 E | 346 m |
| Inominomio | 2.85 S | 11.4833 E | 543 m |
| Irandou | 3.2 S | 11.71667 E | 299 m |
| Irendou | 2.71667 S | 11.0833 E | 328 m |
| Iroungou | 2.91667 S | 11.667 E | 728 m |
| Isogni Salou | 2.4833 S | 10.9 E | 185 m |
| Issibou | 3.05 S | 11.65 E | 487 m |
| Issigou | 2.85 S | 11.233 E | 322 m |
| Ivoumounou | 2.81667 S | 11.0667 E | 233 m |
| Ivoundou | 2.9 S | 11.5 E | 497 m |
| Iyantzi | 3 S | 11.11667 E | 290 m |

=== K–L ===
| Place | Latitude | Longitude | Altitude |
|---|---|---|---|
| Kabi | 2 S | 11 E | 274 m |
| Kabi | 3.0667 S | 11.05 E | 476 m |
| Kabou Nzambi | 2.733 S | 11.51667 N | 693 m |
| Kaka | 2.4667 S | 10.933 E | 211 m |
| Kaki | 2.933 S | 11.033 E | 217 m |
| Kamba | 3.11667 E | 11.71667 S | 337 m |
| Kambala | 2.7667 S | 11.31667 E | 508 m |
| Kanapo | 2.6 S | 11.25 E | 637 m |
| Kayes Congo | 3.733 S | 11.03 E | 75 m |
| Kebili | 2.883 S | 11.61667 E | 723 m |
| Keleba | 2.8 S | 10.1 E | 1 m |
| Kelili | 2.65 S | 11.1833 E | 566 m |
| Keri | 2.4667 S | 10.933 E | 211 m |
| Keri Nzambi | 2 S | 11 E | 294 m |
| Koko Magoma | 2.5833 S | | |
| Kondzi | 2.383 S | 10.6833 E | 153 m |
| Kouango | 2.65 S | 11 E | 269 m |
| Koumougani | 2.31667 S | 11.0667 E | 324 m |
| Koumougari | 2.81667 S | 10.95 E | 175 m |
| Kouri | 3.35 S | 11.633 E | 287 m |
| Latsa | 2.51667 S | 11.2 E | 565 m |
| Lembe | 3.0833 S | 11.1833 E | 432 m |
| Louango | 2.633 S | 10.9 E | 171 m |
| Louangou | 3.15 S | 11.31667 E | 439 m |
| Loungou Zambi | 3.75 S | 11.033 E | 65 m |

=== M–N ===
| Place | Latitude | Longitude | Altitude |
|---|---|---|---|
| Mabagou | 3.35 S | 10.7 E | 69 m |
| Mabala | 2 S | 11 E | 341 m |
| Mabala | 2.5 S | 11.2 E | 566 m |
| Mabili | 3 S | 11 E | 304 m |
| Mabili | 3.2667 S | 11.5667 E | 294 m |
| Maboka | 3.33 S | 10.7 E | 89 m |
| Mabou | 3.01667 S | 11.51667 E | 365 m |
| Mabouma | 2.71667 S | 11 E | 264 m |
| Mabounga | 2.8667 S | 11.01667 E | 146 m |
| Mabouriga | 2.733 S | 11.133 E | 419 m |
| Maboussou | 2.9833 S | 11.71667 E | 668 m |
| Madonga | 2.4667 S | 10.91667 E | 196 m |
| Magabica | 2.91667 S | 11.3667 E | 461 m |
| Magabiga | 2.8 S | 10.95 E | 190 m |
| Magabika | 2.5833 S | 10.833 E | 132 m |
| Magassiala | 2.81667 S | 11.0667 E | 233 m |
| Magonga | 3.2833 S | 11.71667 E | 291 m |
| Magoumba | 2.35 S | 11.05 E | 317 m |
| Makaba Ndilo | 3.0667 S | 10.81667 E | 317 m |
| Makabana | 2 S | 10 E | 190 m |
| Makabana | 3.133 S | 11.2833 E | 344 m |
| Makabana | 2 S | 11 E | 631 m |
| Makabana | 3 S | 11 E | 430 m |
| Makanana | 2.933 S | 11.7 E | 712 m |
| Makanda | 3 S | 11 E | 306 m |
| Makanda | 3 S | 11 E | 535 m |
| Makanda | 3.8667 S | 11.1 E | 31 m |
| Makanga | 3.21667 S | 11.4667 E | 330 m |
| Makiena | 3.35 S | 10.6833 E | 39 m |
| Makina-Bouissi | 3.35 S | 11.65 E | 278 m |
| Makounou | 3.3667 S | 11.65 E | 286 m |
| Malaba | 2.33 S | 11.0667 E | 327 m |
| Malabilila | 2.75 S | 11.533 E | 670 m |
| Malanga | 3.1667 S | 11.433 E | 265 m |
| Malimba | 3.0833 S | 11.61667 E | 419 m |
| Mallembe | 3.5667 S | 10.8833 E | 14 m |
| Malolo | 2 S | 10 E | 201 m |
| Malolo | 2 S | 10 E | 187 m |
| Malolo | 2.4667 S | 10.85 E | 191 m |
| Mangounga | 2.433 S | 11.0833 E | 318 m |
| Maoumba | 2.55 S | 10.81667 E | 134 m |
| Massanga | 2.65 S | 11.31667 E | 641 m |
| Massanga I | 2 S | 11 E | 197 m |
| Massanga II | 2 S | 11 E | 197 m |
| Massanga III | 2.833 S | 11.033 E | 185 m |
| Massanga IV | 2.833 S | 11.05 E | 197 m |
| Massoli Oubala | 2.733 S | 11.133 S | 419 m |
| Massoti | 2.51667 S | 10.9 E | 191 m |
| Matchiti | 3.4667 S | 10.75 E | 14 m |
| Matoungou | 2.6833 S | 11.3667 S | 617 m |
| Matsanfou | 3.0667 S | 11.6 E | 426 m |
| Matsoumba | 3.233 S | 11.5 E | 323 m |
| Mayamba | 2.9667 S | 10.5667 E | 59 m |
| Mayombo | 2.733 S | 10.81667 E | 119 m |
| Mayumba | 3.41667 S | 10.65 E | 1 m |
| Mbekila | 3.033 S | 11.71667 E | 557 m |
| Mbidiga | 2.667 S | 11.35 E | 631 m |
| Mbissi | 2.933 S | 10.3833 E | 1 m |
| Mboma | 2.9833 S | 10.8833 E | 256 m |
| Mbouissi | 3.2667 S | 10.6833 E | 157 m |
| Mboukou | 2.45 S | 10.733 E | 105 m |
| Mboula | 2.6833 S | 10.61667 E | 99 m |
| Mfoukoualou | 2.5667 S | 10.833 E | 133 m |
| Mibili | 2.933 S | 11.25 E | 290 m |
| Midouma | 2.75 S | 11.433 E | 637 m |
| Migamba | 2.533 S | 11.1833 E | 522 m |
| Migoumba | 2.8 S | 11.05 E | 239 m |
| Miguengui | 3.033 S | 10.833 E | 344 m |
| Mikanda | 2.91667 S | 11.6833 E | 727 m |
| Mikanga | 2.733 S | 11.35 E | 568 m |
| Mikoko | 2.4667 S | 10.8 E | 173 m |
| Milando | 2.65 S | 10.6833 E | 57 m |
| Milandou | 3.033 S | 10.433 E | 33 m |
| Milolo | 2.9833 S | 10.85 E | 299 m |
| Mindoubi | 2.65 S | 11.45 E | 679 m |
| Minguengue | 3.01667 S | 10.85 E | 352 m |
| Minziandzi | 2.7667 S | 10.8833 E | 175 m |
| Mirendi | 3.25 S | 10.6833 E | 185 m |
| Missassa | 2.45 S | 11.1833 E | 502 m |
| Missigou | 2.71667 S | 11.15 E | 458 m |
| Missoti | 2.5 S | 10.7667 E | 150 m |
| Missouli | 2.9667 S | 11.8 E | 679 m |
| Mivangiri | 2.35 S | 11.05 E | 317 m |
| Mivengui | 2.7833 S | 11.2833 E | 447 m |
| Mivoka | 2.8 S | 11.0667 E | 254 m |
| Moabi | 2.4 S | 10.9833 E | 250 m |
| Moabi Koudou | 2.5667 S | 11.2833 E | 673 m |
| Moabi-Tsao | 2.8833 S | 11.133 E | 189 m |
| Mogno Souka | 2.7833 S | 11.0833 E | 294 m |
| Molito | 3.2667 S | 11.5 E | 356 m |
| Mongo Milando | 3.05 S | 10.4833 E | 57 m |
| Mossamala | 2.8 S | 10.1 E | 1 m |
| Moubou | 2.533 S | 10.6 E | 72 m |
| Mouenda | 2.91667 S | 10.5 E | 31 m |
| Mouetji | 2.65 S | 11.1667 E | 548 m |
| Mougando Dimbo | 2.7667 S | 10.9 E | 180 m |
| Mougandza | 2.7667 S | 10.9667 E | 205 m |
| Mougnigou | 2.9 S | 11.633 E | 726 m |
| Mougnigou II | 2.8833 S | 11.6 E | 703 m |
| Mougnimbou | 3.0833 S | 10.8 S | 334 m |
| Mougoudi | 2.71667 S | 10.7 E | 92 m |
| Mougouma | 2.35 S | 10.633 E | 103 m |
| Moukaba Neny | 2.433 S | 10.933 E | 215 m |
| Moukakala | 2.61667 S | 11.3833 E | 693 m |
| Moukambo | 3.0833 S | 11.633 E | 427 m |
| Moukangi | 2.8833 S | 10.4833 E | 29 m |
| Moukenja | 2.51667 S | 11.2 E | 565 m |
| Moukondo | 3.033 S | 10.4833 E | 64 m |
| Moukongo Ndende | 2.8667 S | 10.2667 E | 1 m |
| Moulagasiala | 2.667 S | 10.6833 E | 104 m |
| Moulamba | 2.65 S | 10.9833 E | 250 m |
| Moulandou | 2.61667 S | 11.133 E | 508 m |
| Moulonda | 2.5833 S | 11.2667 E | 652 m |
| Moulondo | 3.0833 S | 10.45 E | 19 m |
| Moumou Boumba | 3.35 S | 10.7 E | 69 m |
| Mounanga | 2 S | 11 E | 598 m |
| Mounanga | 2.9833 S | 10.91667 E | 257 m |
| Moungoundi | 2.95 S | 11.41667 E | 415 m |
| Mouralou | 3.35 S | 11.633 E | 287 m |
| Mourambo Kata | 2.733 S | 10.9667 E | 221 m |
| Mourima | 2.667 S | 11.033 E | 312 m |
| Mouringa Issenguele | 2.75 S | 11.11667 E | 370 m |
| Mouroungouya | 3.2833 E | 11.7667 E | 291 m |
| Moussamba | 2.95 S | 11.71667 E | 700 m |
| Moussamo Niambi | 2.7833 S | 10.0833 E | 1 m |
| Moussamou Kougou | 2.41667 S | 10.95 E | 226 m |
| Moussamou Ygoyo | 3.2833 S | 11.6 E | 283 m |
| Moussangala | 2.6 S | 10.667 E | 118 m |
| Moussitou | 3.05 S | 10.833 E | 342 m |
| Moussitoulela | 2.8 S | 11.4667 E | 587 m |
| Moutoumba | 2.4 S | 10.9833 E | 250 m |
| Moutoungou | 2.41667 S | 10.95 E | 226 m |
| Mouvanga | 3.01667 S | 10.85 E | 352 m |
| Mouvanga-Panza | 2.5833 S | 10.65 E | 116 m |
| Mouyamba | 3.31667 S | 10.7 E | 112 m |
| Mouyombi-Tali | 2.533 S | 10.8 E | 143 m |
| Mouyoungou | 3.1667 S | 10.7667 E | 364 m |
| Ndende | 2 S | 10 E | 153 m |
| Ndende | 2.81667 S | 11.25 E | 356 m |
| Ndendi | 3.1833 S | 11.71667 E | 311 m |
| Nfigou | 2.55 S | 10.9 E | 176 m |
| Ngondi | 3.33 S | 10.,7 E | 89 m |
| Ngoula | 2.95 S | 11.45 E | 434 m |
| Ngoungou | 2,51667 S | 10.9 E | 191 m |
| Ngoussou | 3 S | 11.1667 E | 290 m |
| Nguenda Pahilo | 2.4667 S | 11.1833 E | 518 m |
| Niengo | 2.9 S | 11.3833 E | 472 m |
| Nienzi Mogne | 3.7667 S | 11.01667 E | 29 m |
| Noumbou | 2.55 S | 10.81667 E | 134 m |
| Nvounda | 2.71667 S | 11.15 E | 458 m |
| Nyanga | 2.9833 S | 10.2833 E | 1 m |
| Nyanga-Vembe | 2 S | 10 E | 113 m |
| Nzanza | 2 S | 11 E | 629 m |
| Nzenzila | 2 S | 10 E | 208 m |
| Nzinga | 2.9667 S | 11.5667 E | 513 m |
| Nzinga Tchi | 2 S | 11 E | 558 m |

=== O–P ===
| Place | Latitude | Longitude | Altitude |
|---|---|---|---|
| Ombila | 2.8 S | 11.25 E | 383 m |
| Oueliga | 2.71667 S | 11.3833 E | 597 m |
| Oueligha | 2.85 S | 10.4667 E | 24 m |
| Pabo Nzambi | 2.4833 S | 10.81667 E | 174 m |
| Pahilou | 2.8 S | 10.9833 E | 200 m |
| Pahouzambi | 2.75 S | 10.8667 E | 164 m |
| Pananga | 3.033 S | 11.133 E | 351 m |
| Panga | 3.233 S | 10.5667 E | 37 m |
| Passeur | 2.7667 S | 10.05 E | 1 m |
| Pembi | 3.2667 S | 10.6833 E | 157 m |
| Pemo | 3.1833 S | 11.3667 E | 482 m |
| Peni Gnoundou | 2.7 S | 11.1667 E | 475 m |
| Poka | 2.933 S | 11.31667 E | 391 m |
| Polombya | 2.45 S | 10.985 E | 219 m |
| Porro | 2.4 S | 10.7 E | 163 m |
| Poudi | 3.1 S | 11.65 E | 390 m |
| Pounga-Nganda | 2.9667 S | 10.85 E | 263 m |
| Povo | 3.233 S | 11.5 E | 323 m |

=== R–S ===
| Place | Latitude | Longitude | Altitude |
|---|---|---|---|
| Randi I | 2.9833 S | 10.933 E | 271 m |
| Randi II | 2 S | 10 E | 274 m |
| Rima Nzala | 2.4667 S | 10.95 E | 226 m |
| Rinanzala | 3.116667 S | 11.7 E | 334 m |
| Riranzala | 2.75 S | 10.8 E | 106 m |
| Sainte-Marie | 3.8 S | 11.01667 E | 11 m |
| Sanda | 2.3667 S | 11.01667 E | 289 m |
| Sanga | 2.9833 S | 10.85 E | 342 m |
| Sanga Plaine | 2.9667 E | 10.95 E | 274 m |
| Sette Banda | 3.833 E | 11.033 S | 6 m |
| Singa Plaine | 3.01667 E | 10.85 E | 352 m |
| Singna | 2.9 S | 11.1833 E | 224 m |
| Soangui | 2.4833 S | 10.5833 E | 42 m |
| Soukila | 2.3667 S | 11.01667 E | 289 m |

=== T–V ===
| Place | Latitude | Longitude | Altitude |
|---|---|---|---|
| Tando Filou | 2.75 S | 11.1667 E | 370 m |
| Tchibanga | 2.85 S | 11.033 E | 547 m |
| Tchiagana | 3.722 S | 11.05 E | 100 m |
| Tchimbia | 3.816667 S | 11.01667 E | 7 m |
| Tchingondo | 3.51667 S | 10.81667 E | 11 m |
| Tchitende | 3.9 S | 11.133 E | 19 m |
| Tia | 3.6 S | 10.9667 E | 39 m |
| Toco Tsiala | 3.7667 S | 11.01667 E | 29 m |
| Tono | 3.033 S | 10.833 E | 344 m |
| Tono Sangana | 2 S | 11 E | 617 m |
| Tonokamba | 2.65 S | 10.633 E | 112 m |
| Toulougaba | 2.6833 S | 10.7 E | 101 m |
| Toumba | 2.8667 S | 11.667 E | 738 m |
| Tsegnou Baba | 2.7667 S | 11.11667 E | 354 m |
| Tsogni | 2.8 S | 10.1667 E | 1 m |
| Tsogui | 3.05 S | 10.433 E | 32 m |
| Tsouka | 2.33 S | 11.05 E | 314 m |
| Voulougangou | 2.633 S | 11.133 E | 504 m |
| Voumvou | 3 S | 11 E | 307 m |

=== Y–Z ===
| Place | Latitude | Longitude | Altitude |
|---|---|---|---|
| Yabala | 2.85 S | 11.2667 E | 354 m |
| Yandji | 3.0833 S | 11.233 E | 354 m |
| Yelo | 2.6 S | 11.3667 E | 700 m |
| Yendji | 2.81667 S | 10.0667 E | |
| Yeyena | 3.033 S | 10.433 E | 33 m |
| Zambi Zanza | 3.41667 S | 10.7 E | 18 m |
| Zangui Mamba | 2.8833 S | 10.2 E | 1 m |
| Zembi-Zanza | 3.5 S | 10.833 E | 71 m |
