= Haute-Banio (department) =

Coordinates: 3°48′18″S 11°06′14″E

- Department
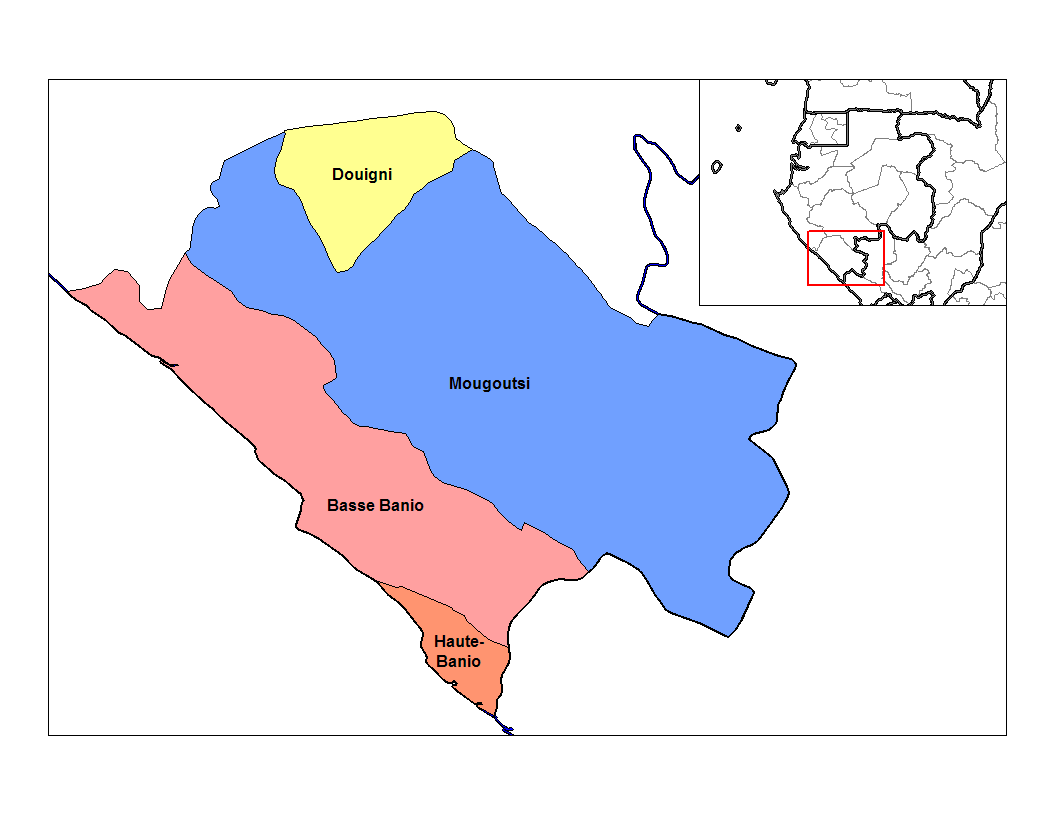
- Haute-Banio Department in the region
- Country: Gabon
- Province: Nyanga Province

Population (2013 Census)
  - Total: 1,413
- Time zone: UTC+1 (GMT +1)

Haute-Banio is a department of Nyanga Province in south-western Gabon. It is the most southernly department in Gabon and borders the Republic of the Congo. The capital lies at Ndindi. It had a population of 1,413 in 2013.

== Towns and villages ==
Capital Haute Banio is Ndindi
