= Chipoka =

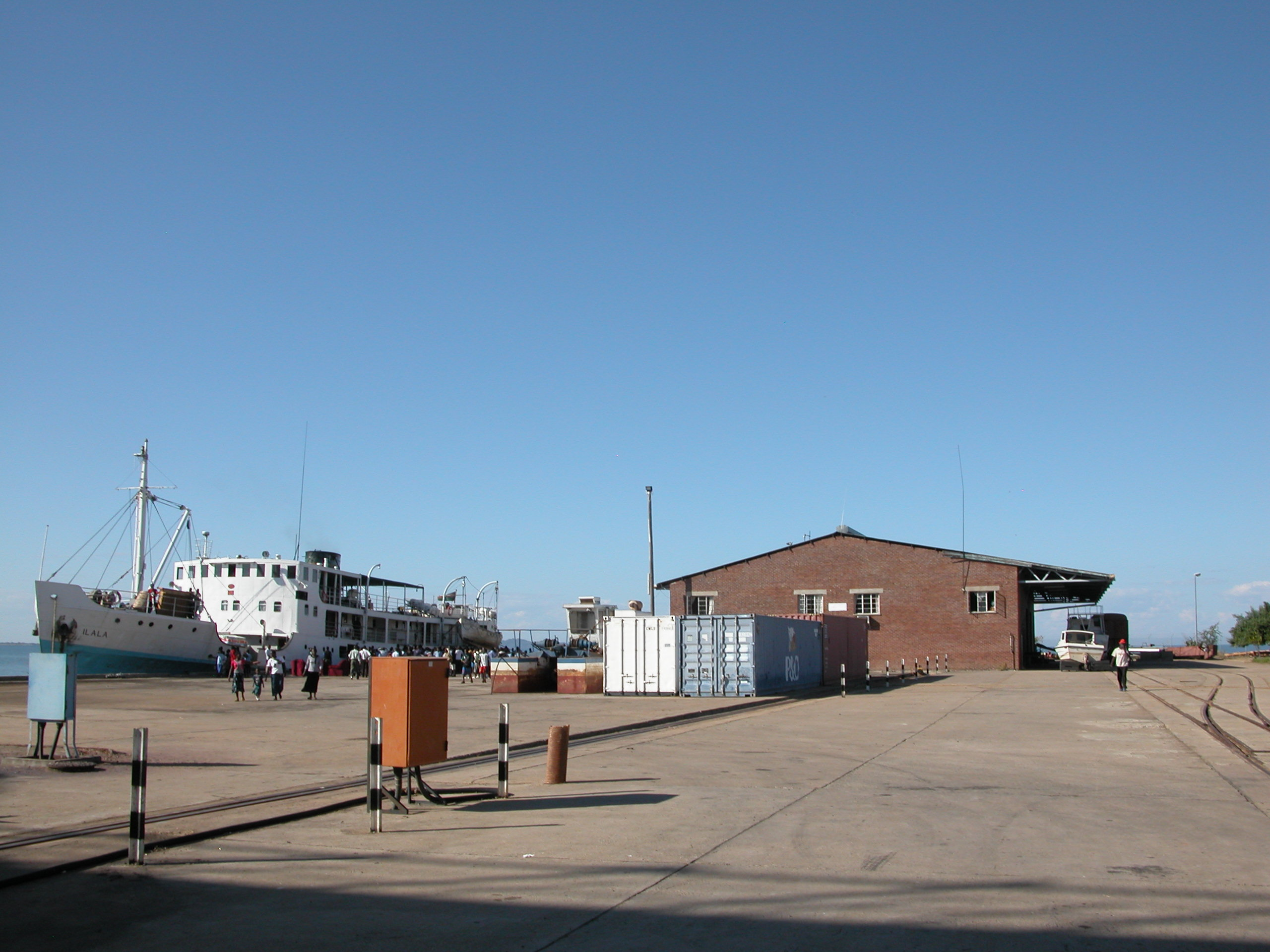

- Location in Malawi
- Coordinates: 13°58′S 34°30′E
- Country: Malawi
- Region: Central Region
- District: Salima District

Population (2018 Census)
  - Total: 6,395
- Climate: Aw

Chipoka is a town located in the Central Region district of Salima, in Malawi. It is one of the main ports on Lake Malawi and is the closest port to the capital city of Lilongwe. Chipoka is located on the western shore of Kasangha Bay across from Cape Maclear.

Nearby towns and villages include Chaseta (7.8 mi (12.6 km)), Ndembo (7.7 mi (12.4 km)), Kalombola (5.6 mi (9.0 km)), Lowe (5.6 mi (9.0 km)), Mazenjele (5.6 mi (9.0 km)), Chikanda (4.9 mi (7.9 km)), Milala (4.9 mi (7.9 km)), Mkangawi (4.9 mi (7.9 km)), Mzembela (4.9 mi (7.9 km)), Pemba (4.9 mi (7.9 km)) and Kachindamoto(11.7 mi (18.8 km)).

The city has a railway station on the Sena railway, under concession of Central East African Railways.

== Demographics ==
Year	Population
1998	3,986
2008	5,476
2018	6,395
