= Malaba, Nyanga =

Village in Nyanga Province, Gabon

Coordinates: 2°20′S 11°04′E

Malaba is a village in Nyanga Province, Gabon.
