= Douigni (department) =

Coordinates: 2°26′06″S 11°00′01″E

- Department
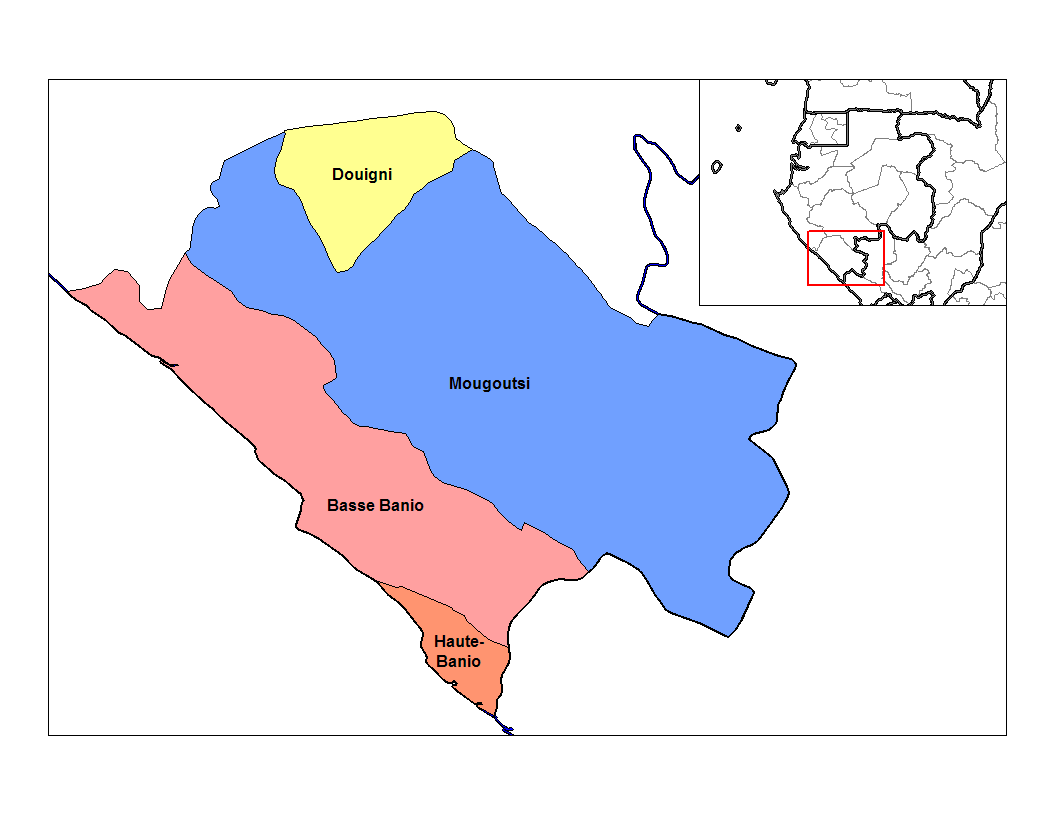
- Douigni Department in the region
- Country: Gabon
- Province: Nyanga Province

Population (2013 Census)
  - Total: 5,235
- Time zone: UTC+1 (GMT +1)

Douigni is a department of Nyanga Province in southern Gabon. The capital lies at Moabi. It had a population of 5,235 in 2013.
