= Doutsila (department) =

- Department
- Country: Gabon
- Province: Nyanga Province

Population (2013 Census)
  - Total: 4,623

Doutsila is a department of Nyanga Province in Gabon. Its population is 4,623 according to 2013 census. Its capital is Mabanda.
