= Matadi Bridge =

Bridge over the Kongo River

Matadi Bridge / OEBK Bridge
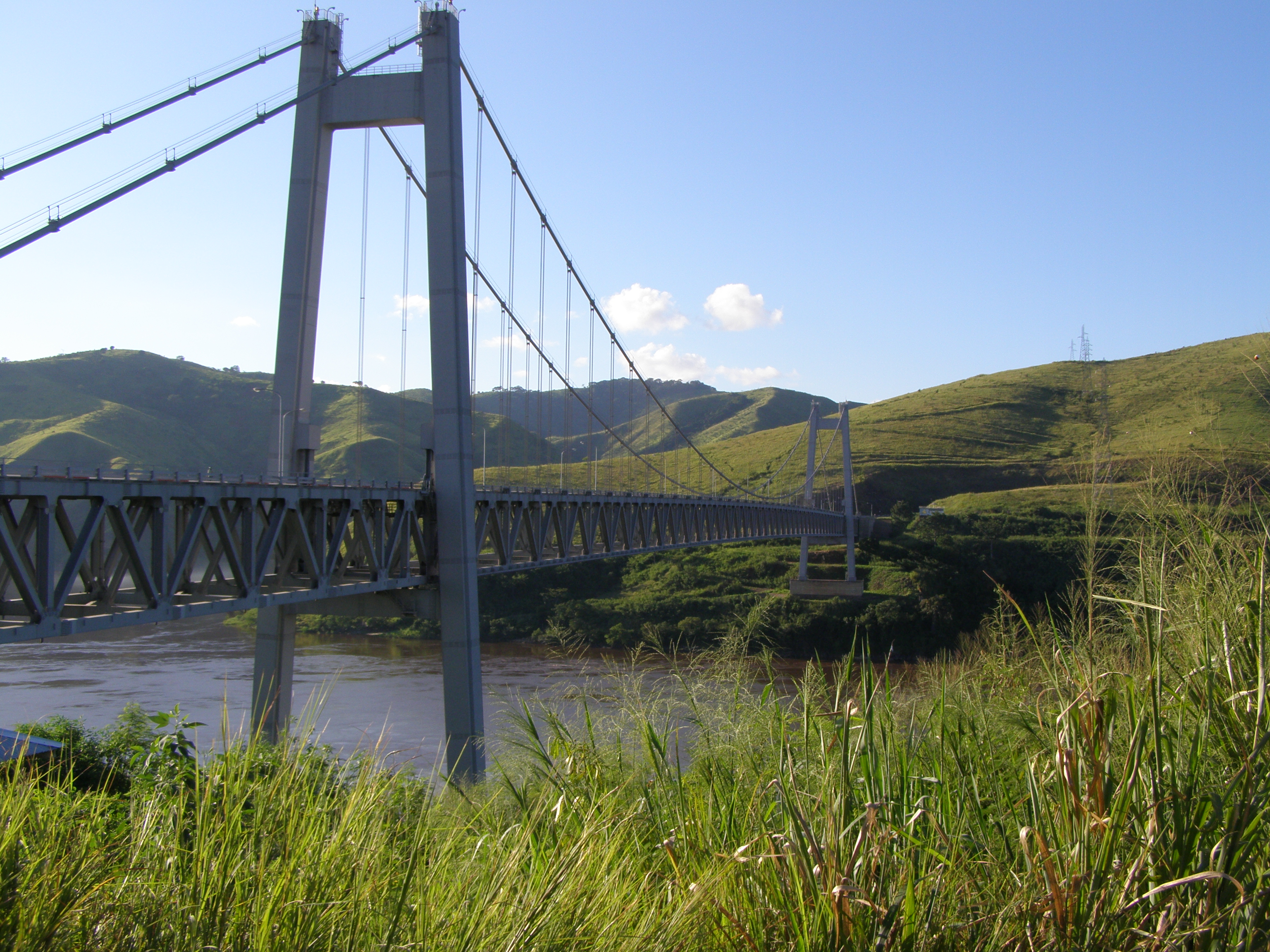
- Coordinates: 5.824466°S 13.433865°E
- Crosses: Congo River
- Locale: Matadi

Characteristics
- Design: Suspension bridge
- Total length: 722 metres (2,369 ft)
- Longest span: 520 metres (1,710 ft)

History
- Construction start: 1979
- Opened: 1983; 43 years ago

Location
- Interactive map of Matadi Bridge / OEBK Bridge

The Matadi Bridge, also known as the OEBK Bridge for Organisation pour l’équipement de Banana-Kinshasa, and formerly known as Pont Maréchal in French, is a suspension bridge across the Congo River at Matadi, Democratic Republic of the Congo. It was completed in 1983, by a consortium of Japanese companies. With a main span of 520 metres (1,710 ft), it was said to be the longest suspension bridge in Africa from its inauguration until the 2018 opening of the Maputo–Katembe bridge. The bridge crosses the Congo River at its narrowest point, just downstream from the port of Matadi. It is the only bridge across the Congo River proper.

== Construction ==
Matadi Bridge was completed in 1983 by a consortium of Japanese companies, led by Ishikawajima-Harima Heavy Industries. It has a main span of 520 metres (1,710 ft) and crosses the Congo River. Matadi Bridge was built with 14,000 tons of steel. The bridge is designed in a way to emphasize that the towers are made up of bar members, with each tower being a single rigid frame. 34.5 billion Japanese yen was paid for by the Japanese government at the request of the erstwhile President Mobutu.

In the 1990s, political instability and conflict in the DRC jeopardized the bridge’s maintenance. Despite the withdrawal of Japanese support, Congolese engineers, notably André Madiata, Ndele Buba and Kalombo Mukeba Josef, maintained the structure using technical documentation left by their Japanese counterparts.

Japan renewed its cooperation in 2012, launching a project to improve the bridge’s management. A visit by Tatsumi Masaaki confirmed the bridge remained in excellent condition, attributed to the dedication of local engineers and the symbolic importance of the structure.

== Railway ==
A railway line across the bridge was intended to be part of a line to Boma and Muanda. However, it was never built.

== See also ==
- List of road-rail bridges
