= Moabi =

- Commune
- Location in Gabon
- Coordinates: 02°25′S 10°59′E
- Country: Gabon
- Province: Nyanga
- Department: Douigni

Moabi is a rural commune in southwestern Gabon, within the Nyanga Province. It serves as the administrative center of Dougini. The primary language spoken is Punu, and the Punu people comprise the largest ethnic group within the commune. The settlement of Miamba is home to the local administration for the commune, and most services.

Villages within the commune include Miamba, Mbamba, Mougouna, Djaba, Souangui Néni, Souangui Kéki, and Poutou Néni.

The commune is served by Moabi Airport.
