= Chaseta =

- Location in Malawi
- Coordinates: 13°55′14.4″S 34°20′54.1″E
- Country: Malawi
- Region: Central Region
- District: Salima District
- Elevation: 698 m (2,290 ft)

Chaseta is a small town in central Malawi near Lake Malawi lying 7.8 miles (12.6 km) west of Chipoka. It is located in Salima District in the Central Region, along the T365 road, to the west of Lifisi.
