= Basse-Banio (department) =

Coordinates: 3°25′S 10°39′E

- Department
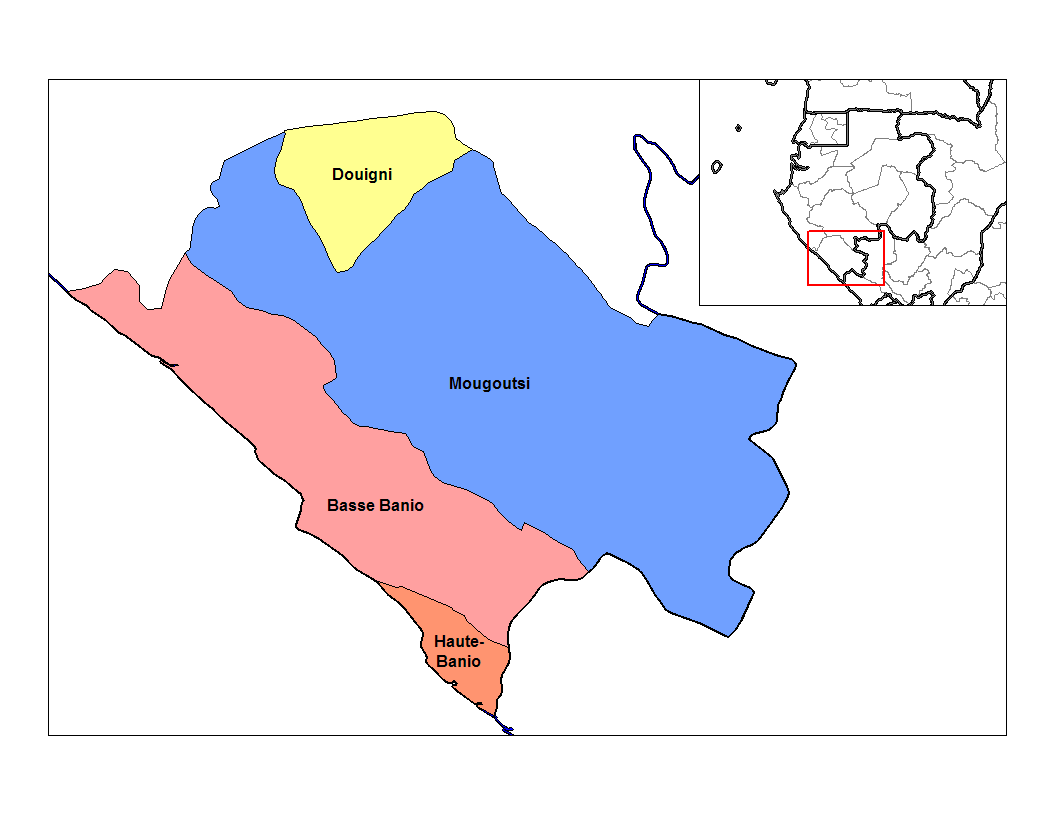
- Basse-Banio Department in the region
- Country: Gabon
- Province: Nyanga Province

Population (2013 Census)
  - Total: 7,192
- Time zone: UTC+1 (GMT +1)

Basse-Banio is a department of Nyanga Province in southern Gabon. The capital lies at Mayumba. It had a population of 7,192 in 2013.
