= Ndindi =

- Location in Gabon
- Coordinates: 3.750779°S 11.177086°E
- Country: Gabon
- Province: Nyanga
- Department: Haute-Banio
- Time zone: UTC+1 (WAT)

Ndindi is a small town in Gabon. It is the capital of the Haute-Banio in Nyanga Province.

== See also ==
- Antoine Mboumbou Miyakou
