= Carl Chassot de Florencourt =

Carl Chassot de Florencourt ([kaʁl ʃaso də flɔʁɑ̃kuʁ]; January 2, 1756 – June 14, 1790) was a cameralist for the Duke of Brunswick who wrote on topics of mathematics and economics. He was also a naturalist who collected insect specimens.

Chassot was born in Braunschweg to Nicolaus Antonius Florencourt who worked as a forest secretary for the Duke of Brunswick, and his wife Johanna Henriette Sophie (née Roehl). Educated at the Collegium Carolinum (joined in 1775), he studied mathematics at the University of Göttingen from 1777. He then worked on mining and forestry and in 1780 he was a appointed professor of philosophy at the University of Göttingen. He travelled with law student Jakob Georg von Berg through Europe in 1781. In 1783 he was appointed a chamber councillor in the Harz mountains overseeing mining activity. In 1785 he published on mining in the past in Über die Bergwerke der Alten.

He collected beetles from the Göttingen area and a work on entomology was published posthumously in 1796. In this work he described the beetle Coccinella testudo.

His most famous work was on economics where he worked out the mathematics of amortization.

- Abhandlungen aus der juristischen und politischen Rechenkunst, nebst einer Vorrede Herrn Hofrath Kästners. (1781)
- Herrn Carl Chassot de Forencourt Herzogl. Braunschweig. Bergrath Correspondent der K. Soc. d. W. zu Göttingen, … über die Bergwerke der Alten. (1785)
- Verzeichniß der Insekten Göttingischer Gegend vom seeligen Cammerrath von Florencout Blankenburg. In: Friedrich Albrecht Anton Meyer (Hrsg.): Zoologisches Archiv. Teil 1, Dyckische Buchhandlung, Leipzig 1796, S. 197–244.
