= Makanga =

Makanga is a surname. Notable people with the surname include:

- Juliet Obanda Makanga (born 1985), Kenyan pharmacologist, neuroscientist and medical researcher
- Médard Makanga (born 1967), Congolese sprinter and hurdler

== See also ==
- Makangarawe
