= Nzanza =

Commune in Matadi, DR Congo

Coordinates: 5.818°S 13.470°E

Nzanza is a commune of the city of Matadi in the Democratic Republic of the Congo.
