= Matadi =

City in Kongo Central, Democratic Republic of the Congo

Matadi Mbanza ya Matadi (Kongo)
- Provincial capital and city
- Ville de Matadi
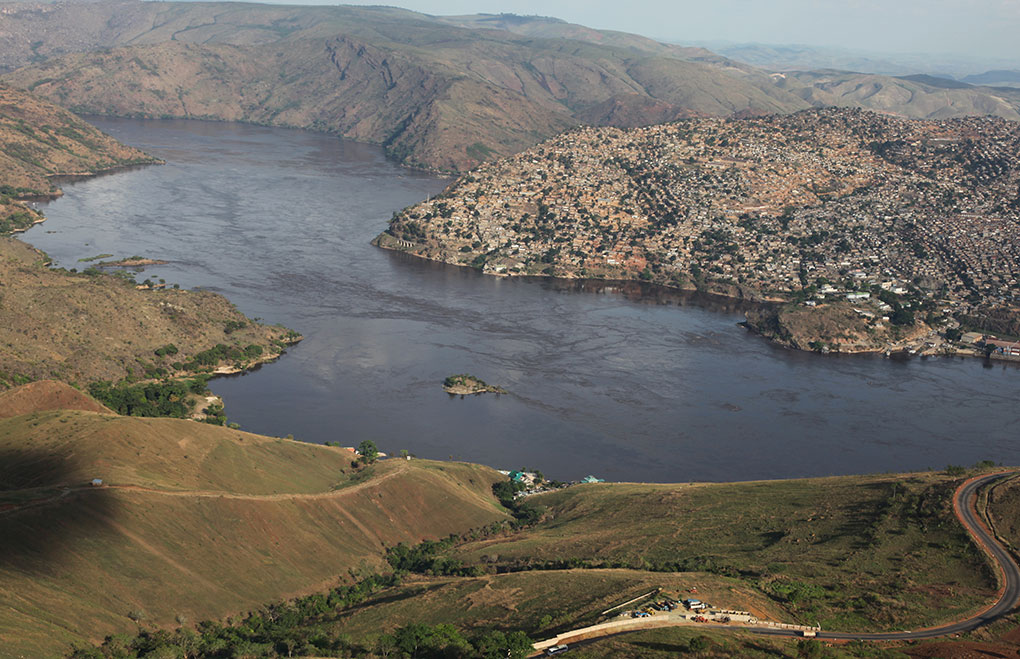
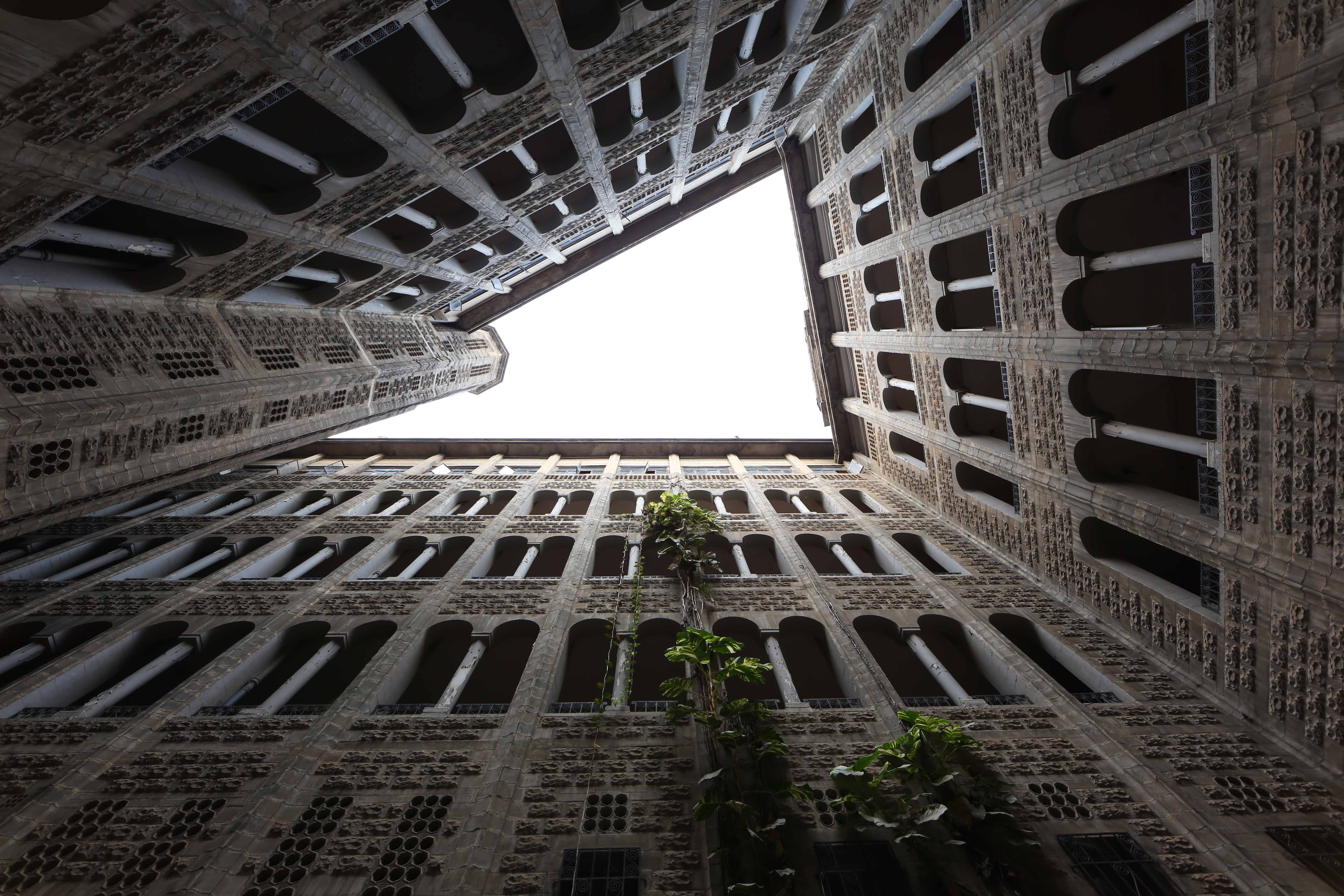
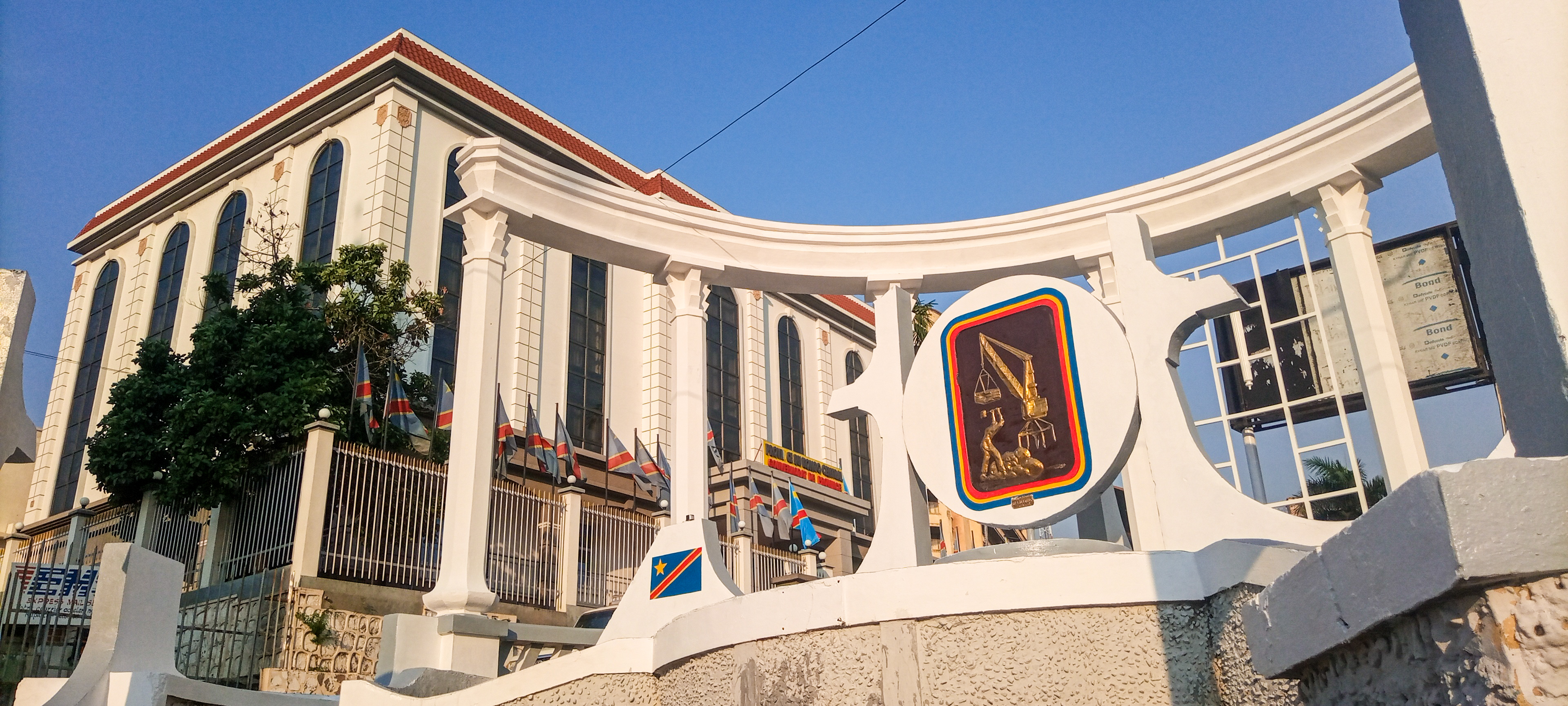
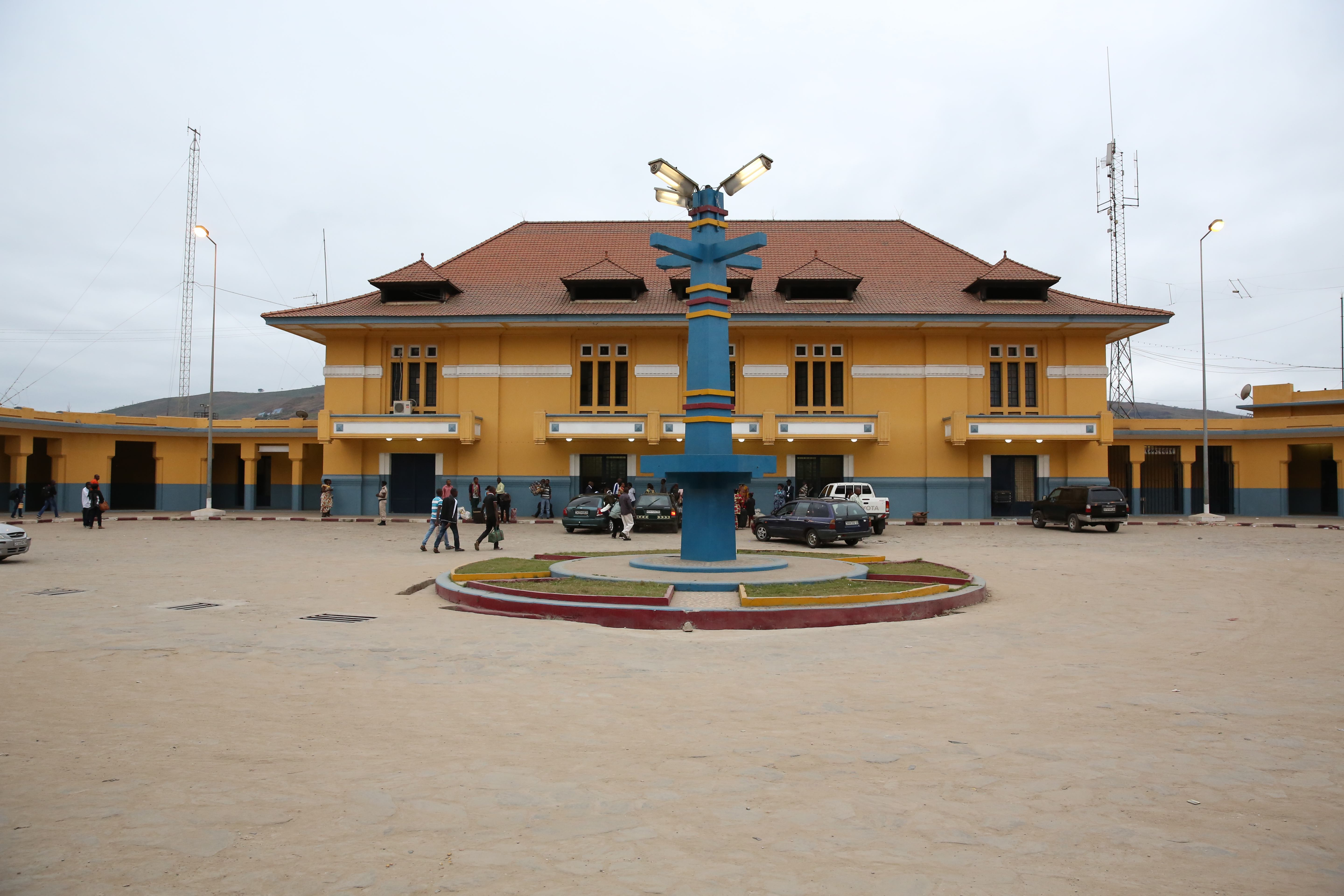
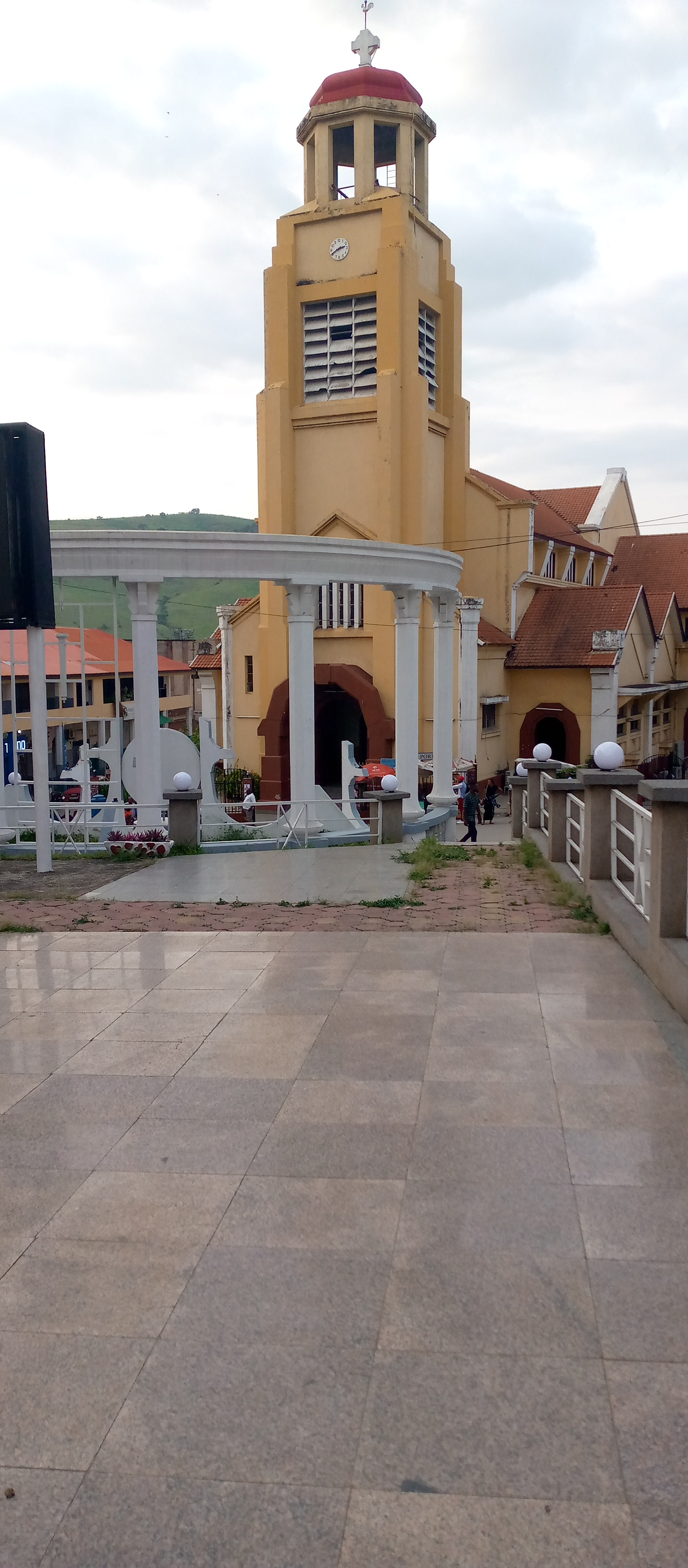
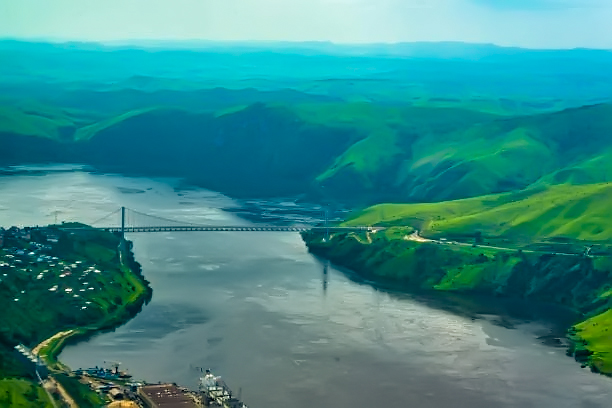
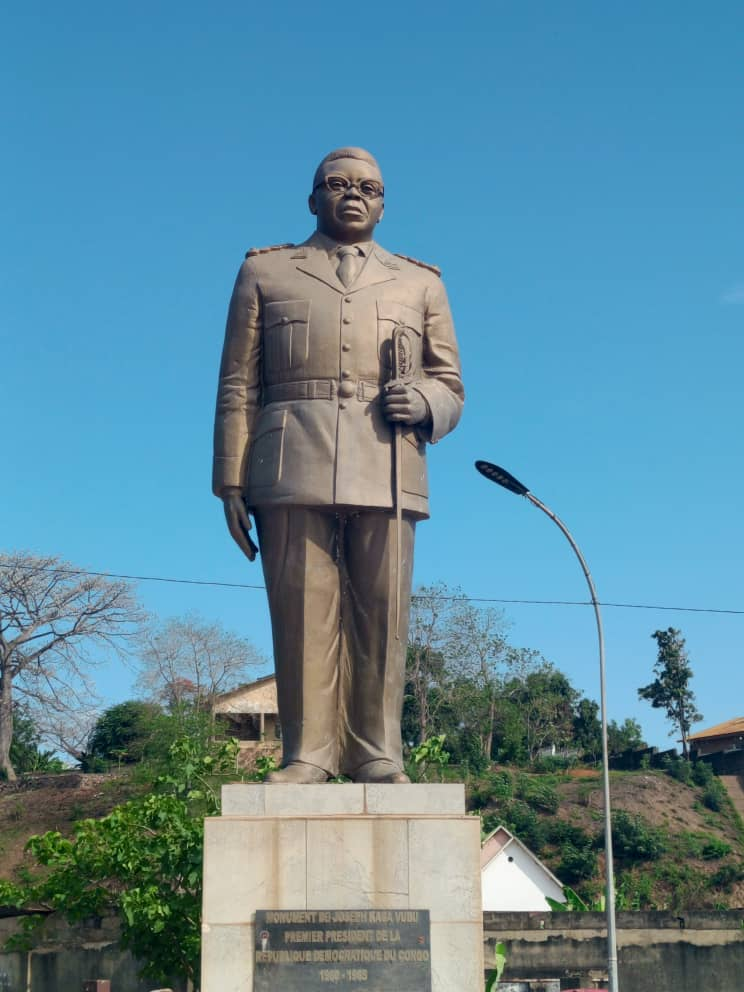
- View over Matadi Matadi Metropole Hotel Governorat Building Central Station Cathedrale of Matadi Matadi Bridge and the Congo River Monument of Joseph Kasa-Vubu
- Nickname: The Stone City
- Location in the Democratic Republic of the Congo
- Coordinates: 5°49′17.3″S 13°27′37.8″E
- Country: Democratic Republic of the Congo
- Province: Kongo Central
- Founded: 1879
- Communes: Matadi, Mvuzi, Nzanza

Government
  - Mayor: Dominique Nkodia

Area
  - City: 110 km^{2} (42 sq mi)

Population (2015)
  - City: 301,644
  - Density: 2,700/km^{2} (7,100/sq mi)
  - Urban: 448,000
  - Ethnicities: Bakongo
- Time zone: UTC+1 (West Africa Time)

Matadi is the chief sea port of the Democratic Republic of the Congo and the capital of the Kongo Central province, adjacent to the border with Angola. It had a population of 245,862 (2004). Matadi is situated on the left bank of the Congo River, 148 km (92 mi) from the mouth and 8 km (5.0 mi) below the last navigable point before the rapids that make the river impassable for a long stretch upriver.

== History ==
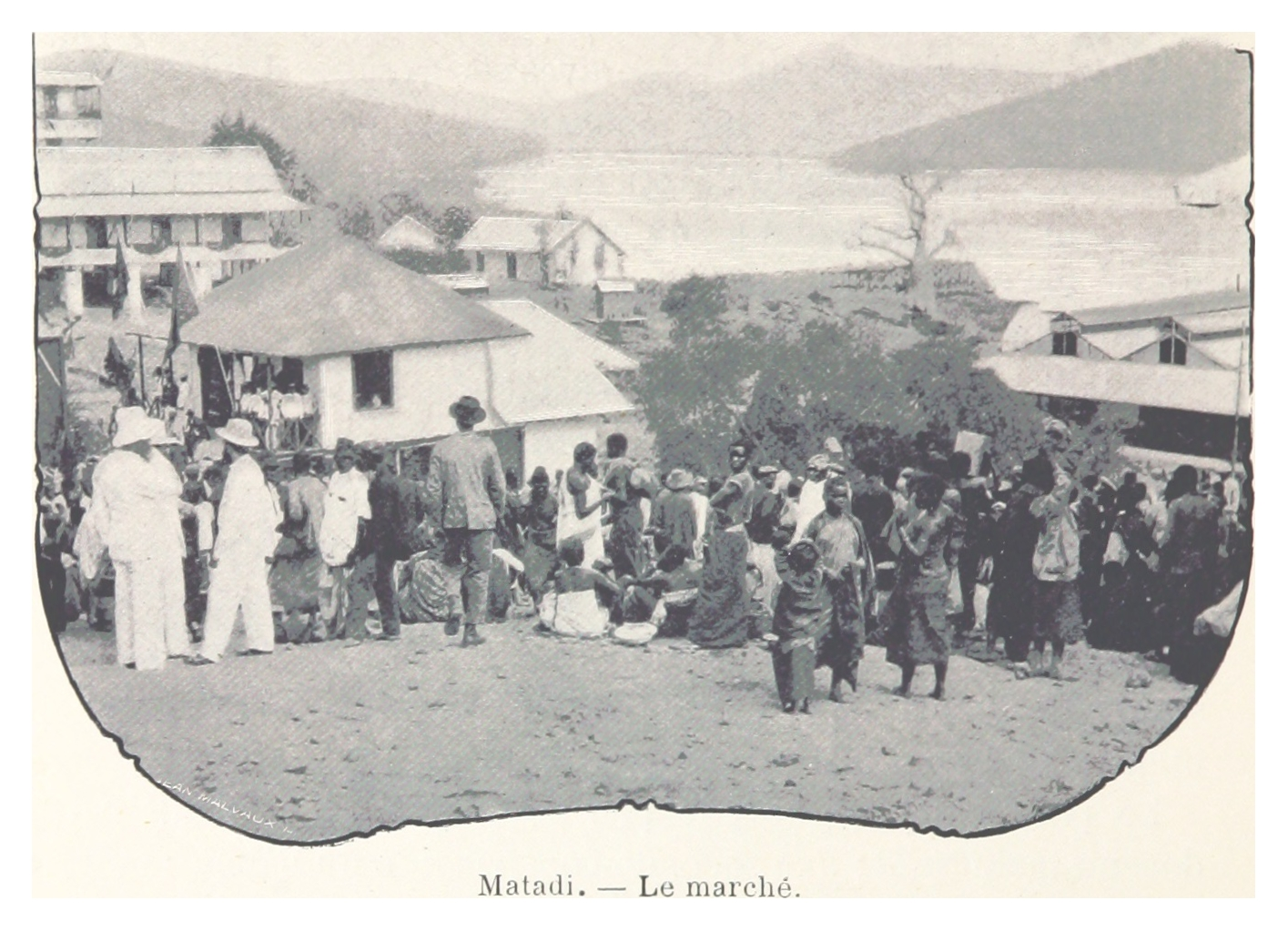
The market, 1899

Matadi was near the site of the state of Vungu, which was first mentioned in 1535 and was said to be destroyed in 1624.

Matadi itself was founded by Sir Henry Morton Stanley in 1879. It was strategically important because it was the last navigable port going upstream on the Congo River; it became the furthest inland port in the Congo Free State. The construction of the Matadi–Kinshasa Railway (built between 1890 and 1898) made it possible to transport goods from deeper within Congo's interior to the port of Matadi, stimulating the city to become an important trading center. Portuguese and French West-African commercial interests influenced the city's architecture and urban design, which borrowed from the neighboring colonies in Angola and the Congo-Brazzaville.

== Culture ==
The word Matadi means stone in the local Kikongo language. The town is built on steep hills. A local saying is that to live in Matadi, one must know the verbs "to go up", "to go down", and "to sweat". Upstream is a series of caves known as the "rock of Diogo Cão", after graffiti carved by the Portuguese explorer in 1485 marking the limit of his travels up the Congo River.

Yelala Rapids lies near the city.

== Climate ==
Matadi has a relatively dry tropical savanna climate (Köppen Aw) with a lengthy dry season from June to September due to the northerly extension of the cold, foggy Benguela Current.

Climate data for Matadi
Month	Jan	Feb	Mar	Apr	May	Jun	Jul	Aug	Sep	Oct	Nov	Dec	Year
Mean daily maximum °C (°F)	33 (91)	33 (92)	34 (94)	34 (93)	33 (91)	30 (86)	28 (83)	29 (84)	30 (86)	32 (90)	33 (91)	32 (90)	32 (89)
Mean daily minimum °C (°F)	24 (76)	24 (76)	24 (76)	24 (76)	24 (75)	22 (71)	20 (68)	21 (69)	22 (72)	24 (75)	24 (75)	24 (75)	23 (74)
Average rainfall cm (inches)	13 (5)	11 (4.3)	17 (6.6)	19 (7.4)	6.1 (2.4)	0.25 (0.1)	0.25 (0.1)	0.25 (0.1)	0.76 (0.3)	2.8 (1.1)	17 (6.7)	15 (5.8)	102.41 (39.9)
Source: Weatherbase

== Infrastructure ==
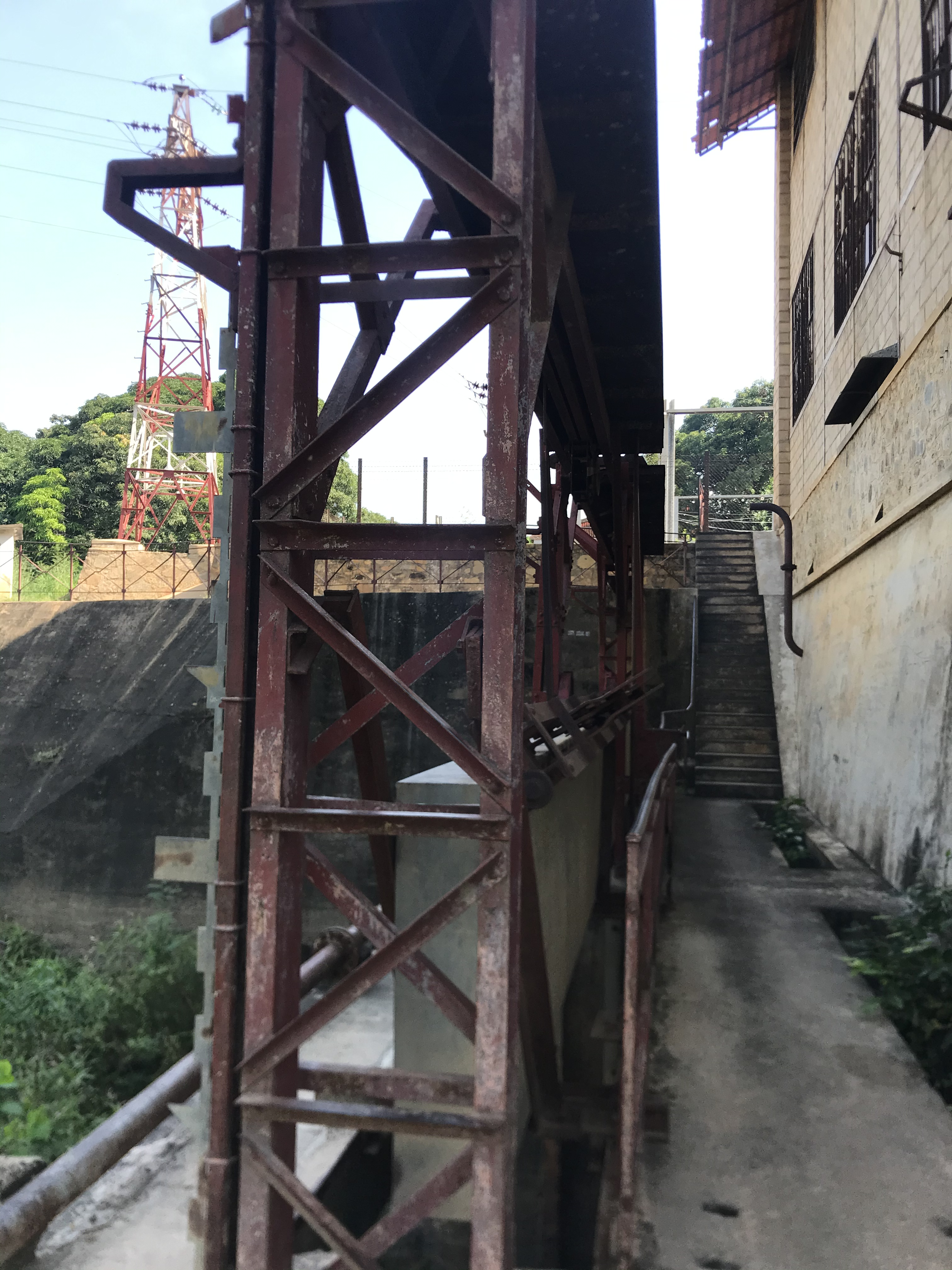
Former building of M'pozo dam in Matadi

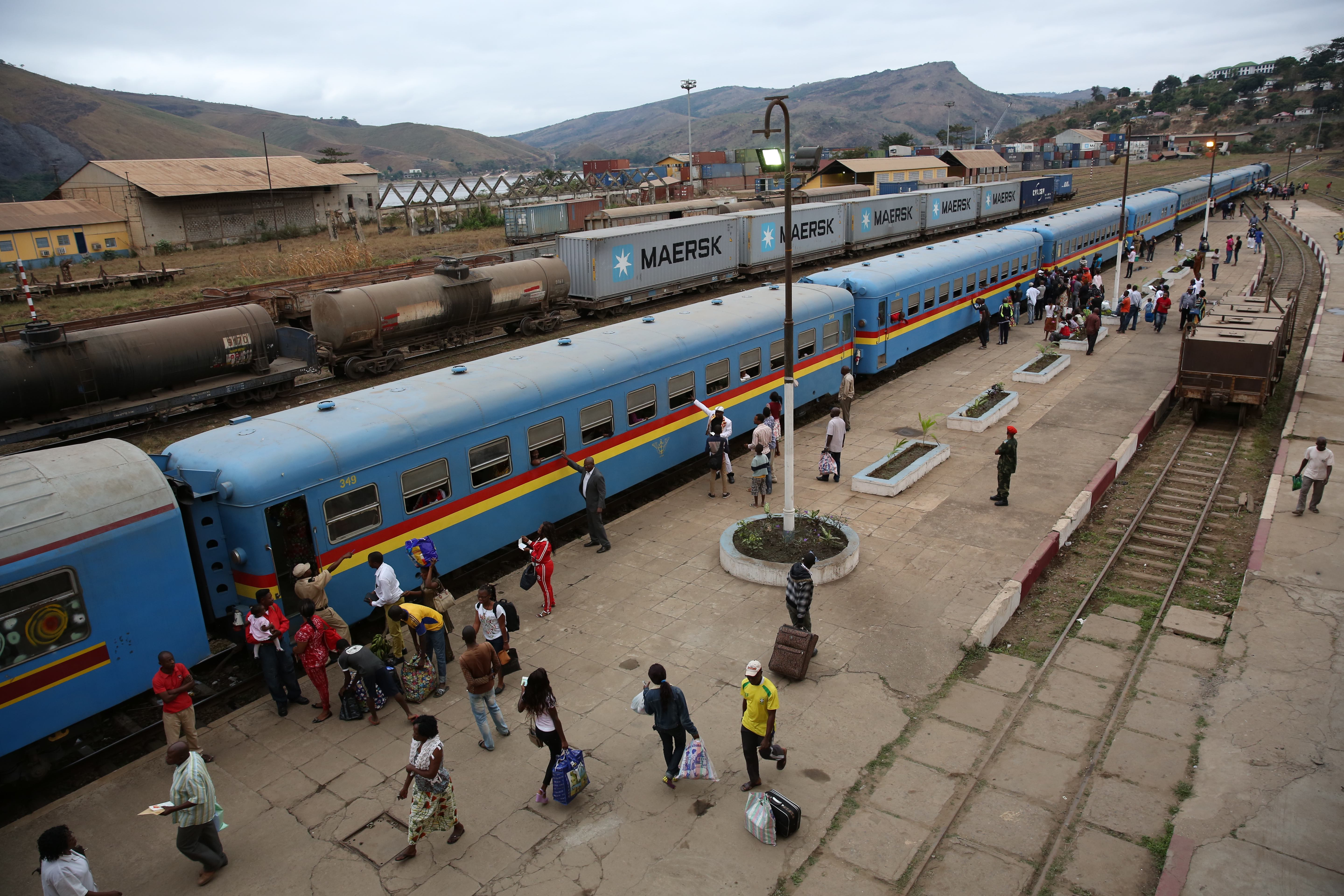
Matadi train station, September 2015

The port of Matadi serves as a major import and export point for the whole nation. Chief exports are coffee and timber. The state fishing company "Pemarza" uses the port to supply fish to Kinshasa. Tshimpi Airport is nearby.

Matadi Bridge, a suspension bridge 722 m- long with a main span of 520 m, built in 1983, crosses the river just south of Matadi, carrying the main road linking Kinshasa to the coast. It is the only bridge over the main stem of the Congo River. After passing through Matadi and over the bridge, it continues to Boma, Muanda and Banana. Although built as a mixed rail and road bridge, no rail line is now operating over the bridge. Matadi is the port railhead for the 366 km long Matadi-Kinshasa Railway, constructed to bypass the rapids on the river upstream. A monument to the builders of the railway stands on a nearby hill.

A power station on the M'pozo River supplies power to Matadi.

== Port ==
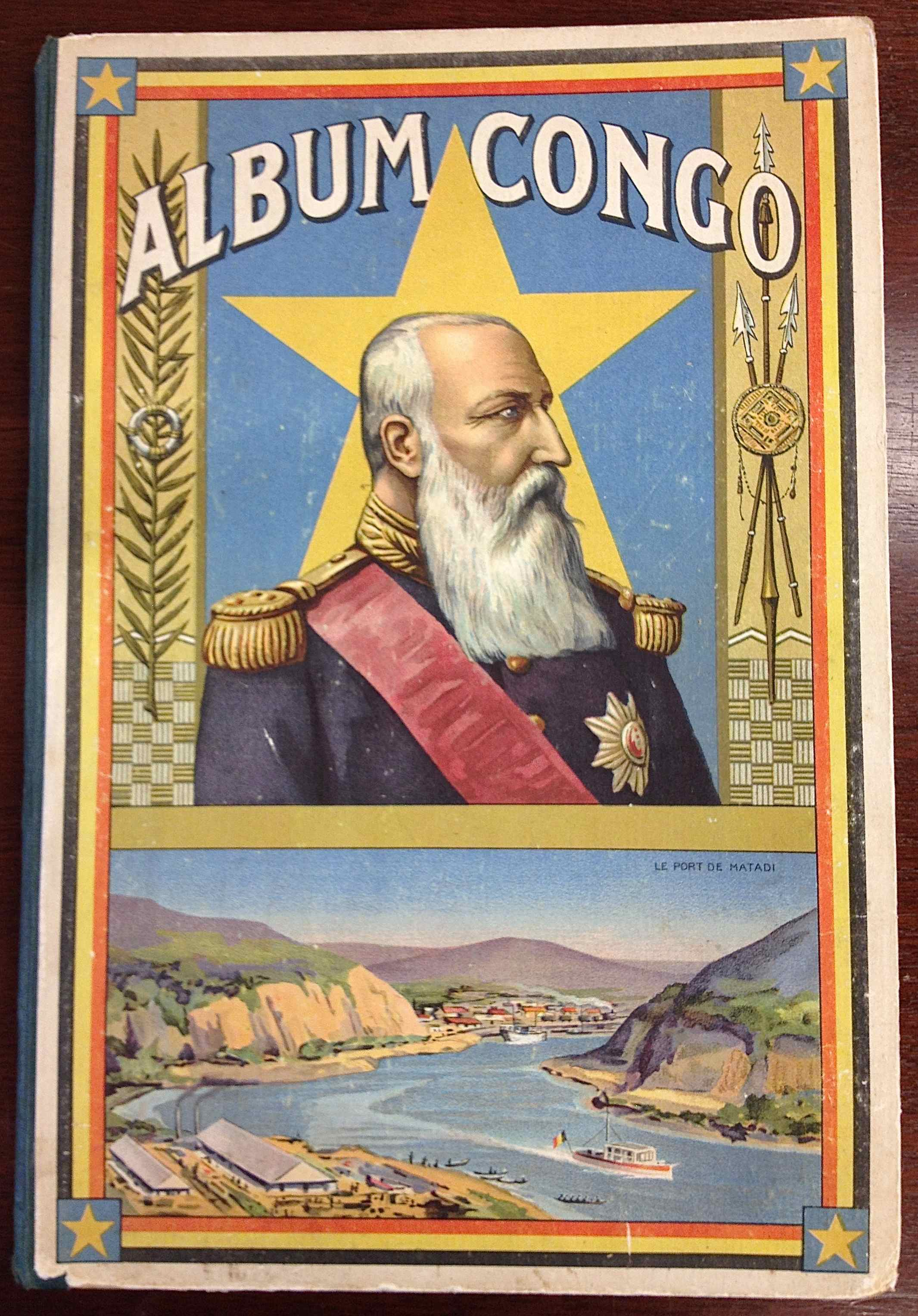
Port of Matadi, on the cover of trading cards from the Congo

The maximum draft of the port is 8.2m. The Navy of the Democratic Republic of the Congo maintains one operational command at the port.

Currently, larger ships are required to transfer cargo to smaller vessels in the Republic of Congo's Pointe-Noire port. For this reason, the development of a deep-sea port at Port Banana was begun in 2022.

== Communes ==
The city of Matadi is administratively divided into three communes: Matadi, Mvuzi and Nzanza.

== Media ==
La Cité africaine de Matadi is a newspaper published in French in Matadi.

In Belgium, a small garden city in the Heverlee suburb of Leuven, was named after Matadi in the 1920s.

== Gallery ==
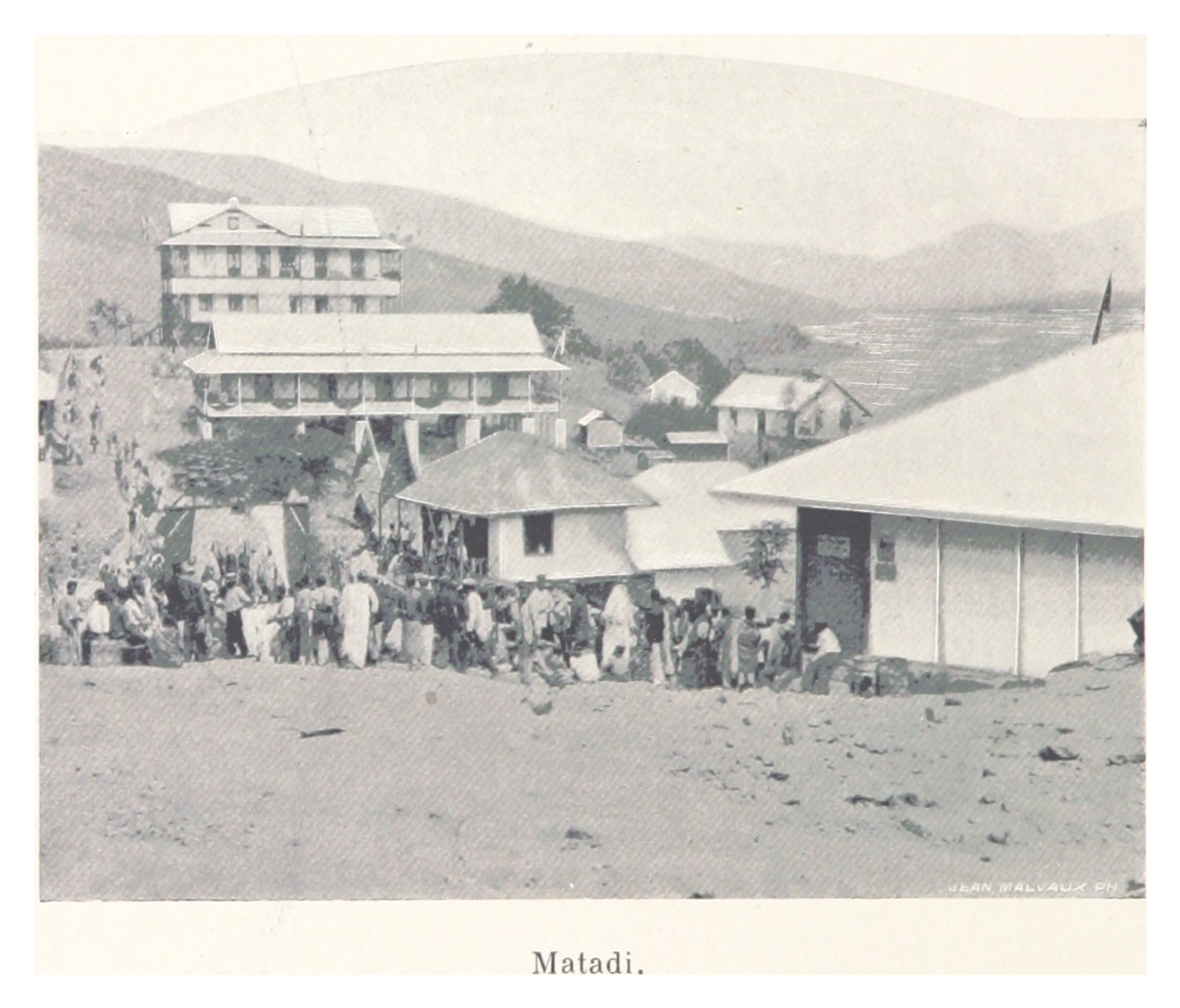
Matadi, 1899

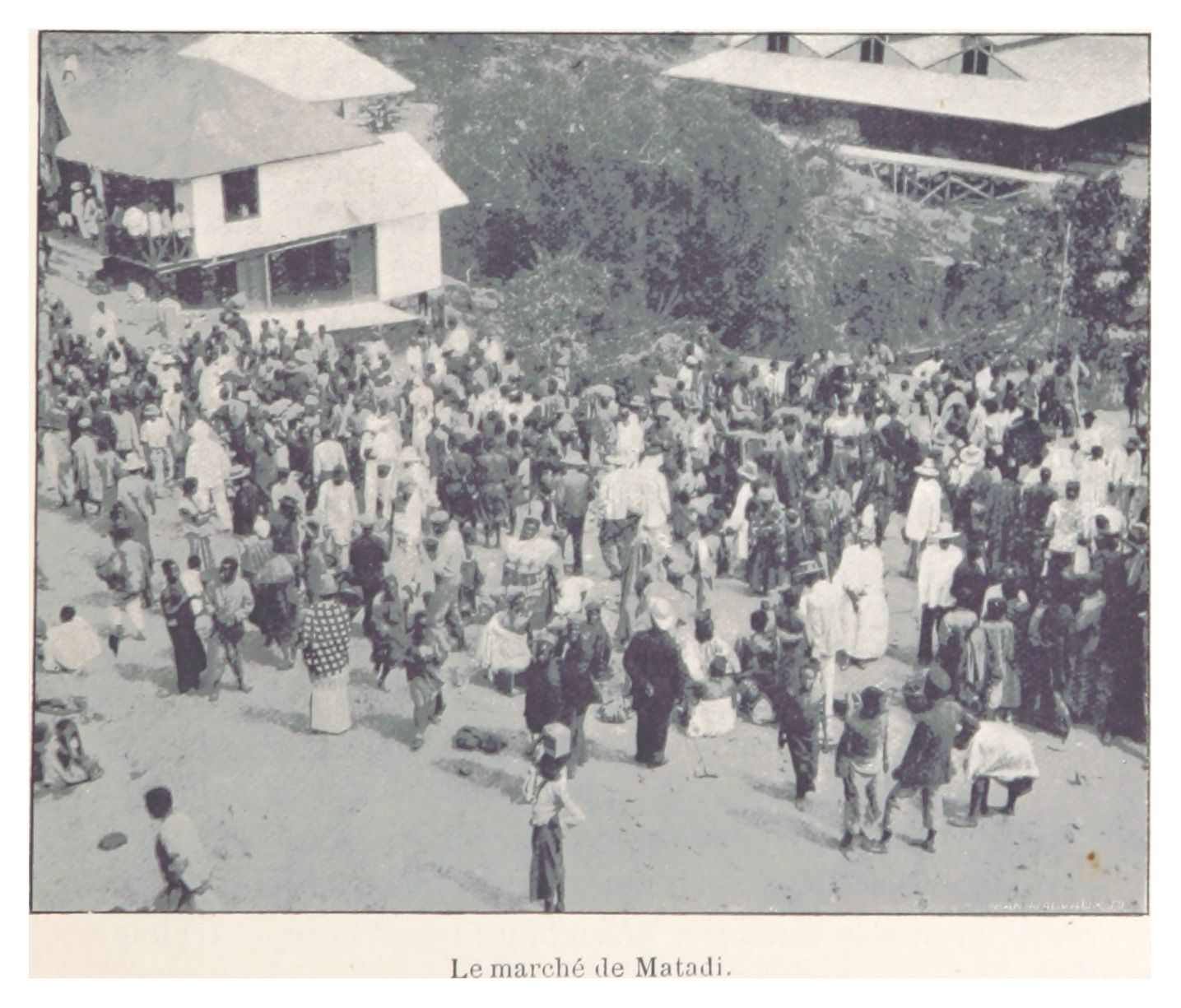
The market, 1899

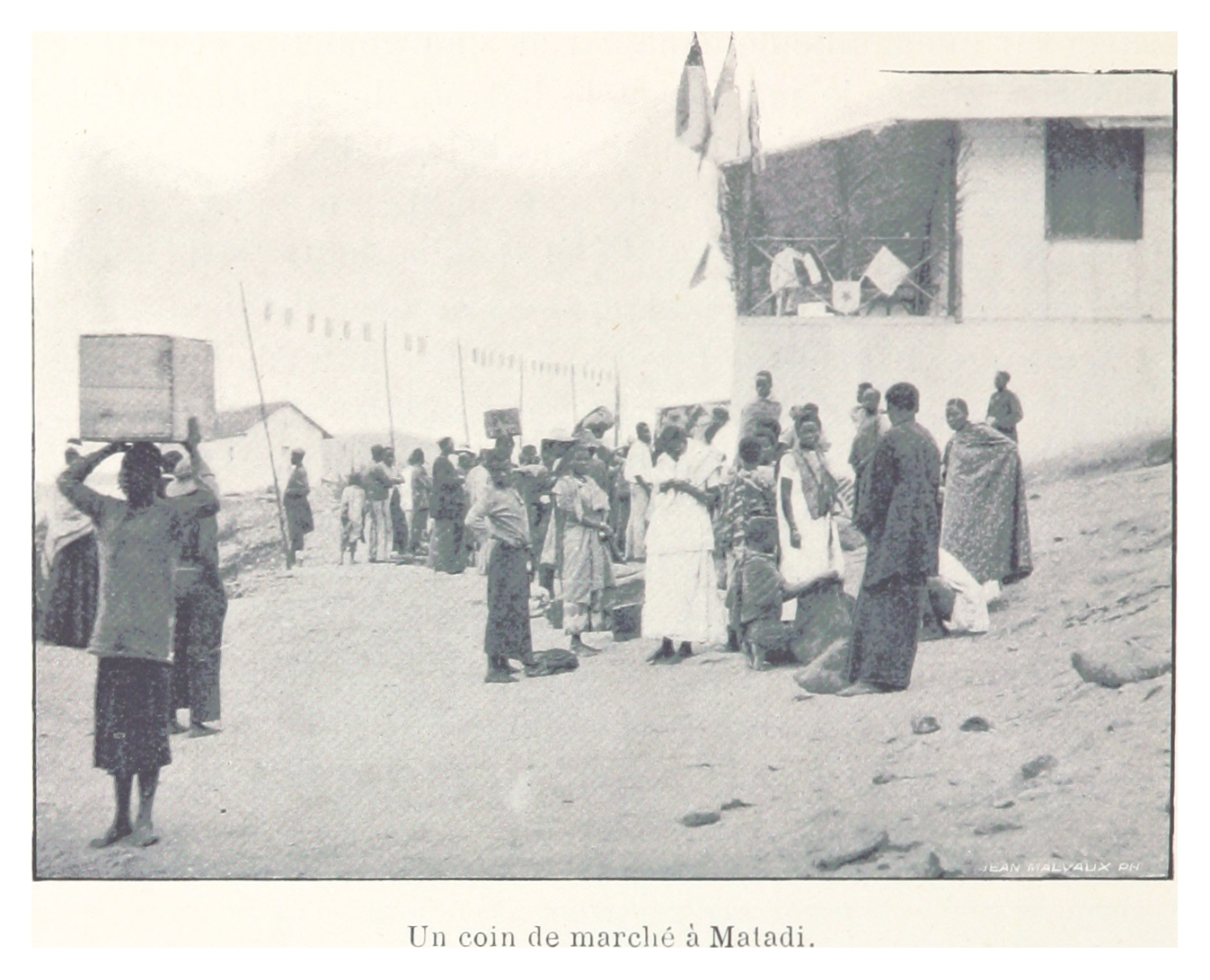
A corner market in Matadi, 1899

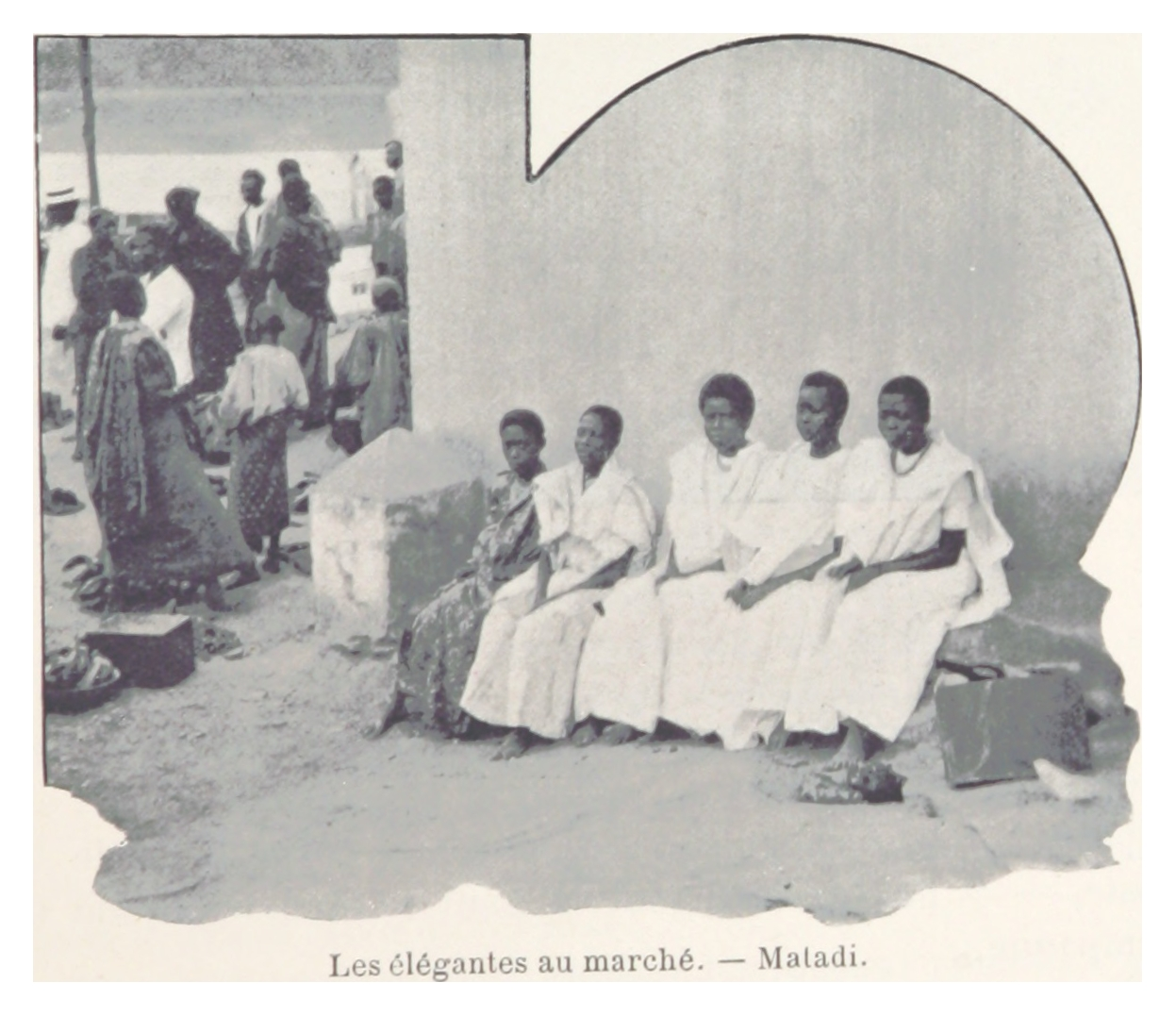
Women at the market in Matadi, 1899

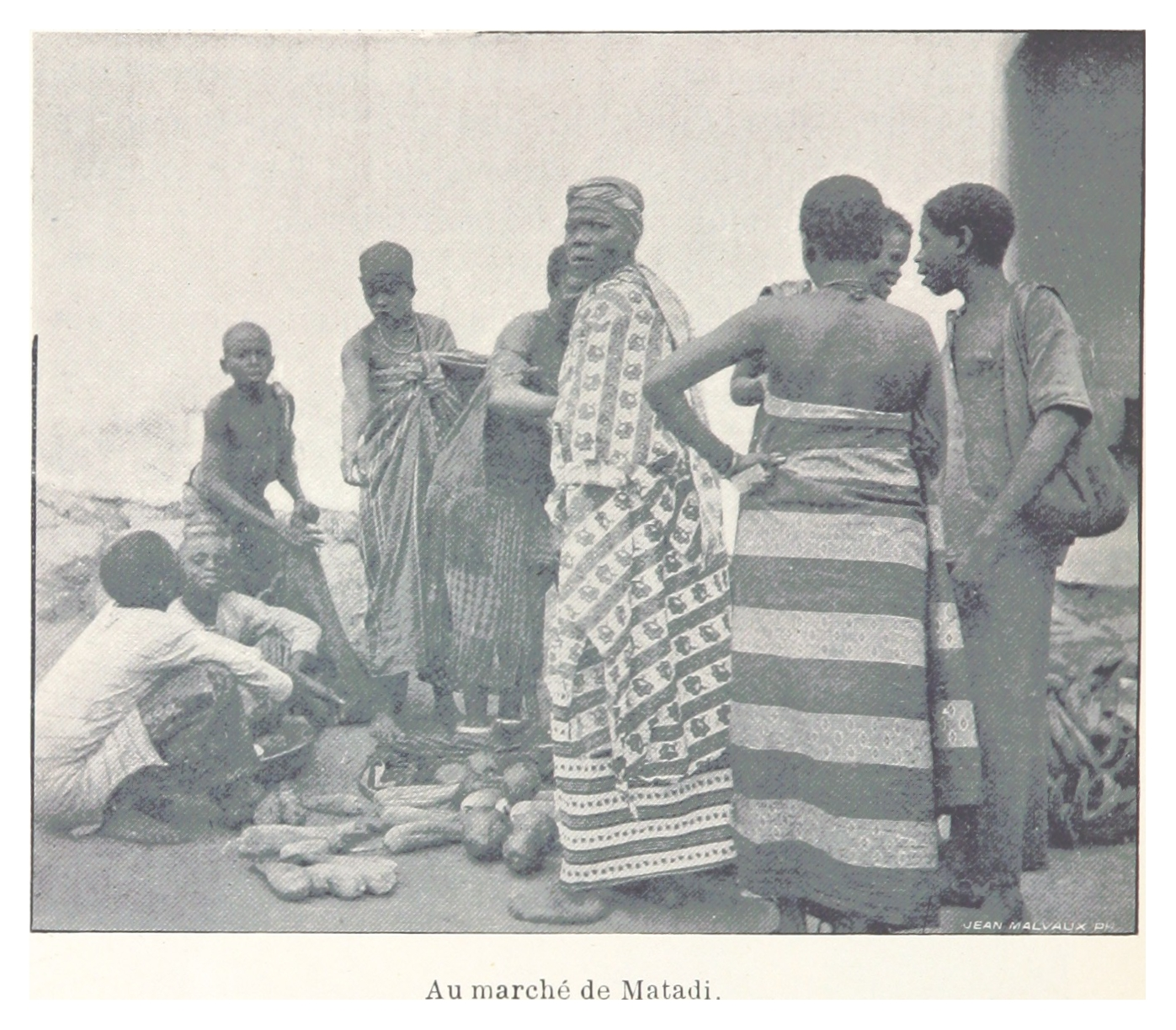
The market, 1899

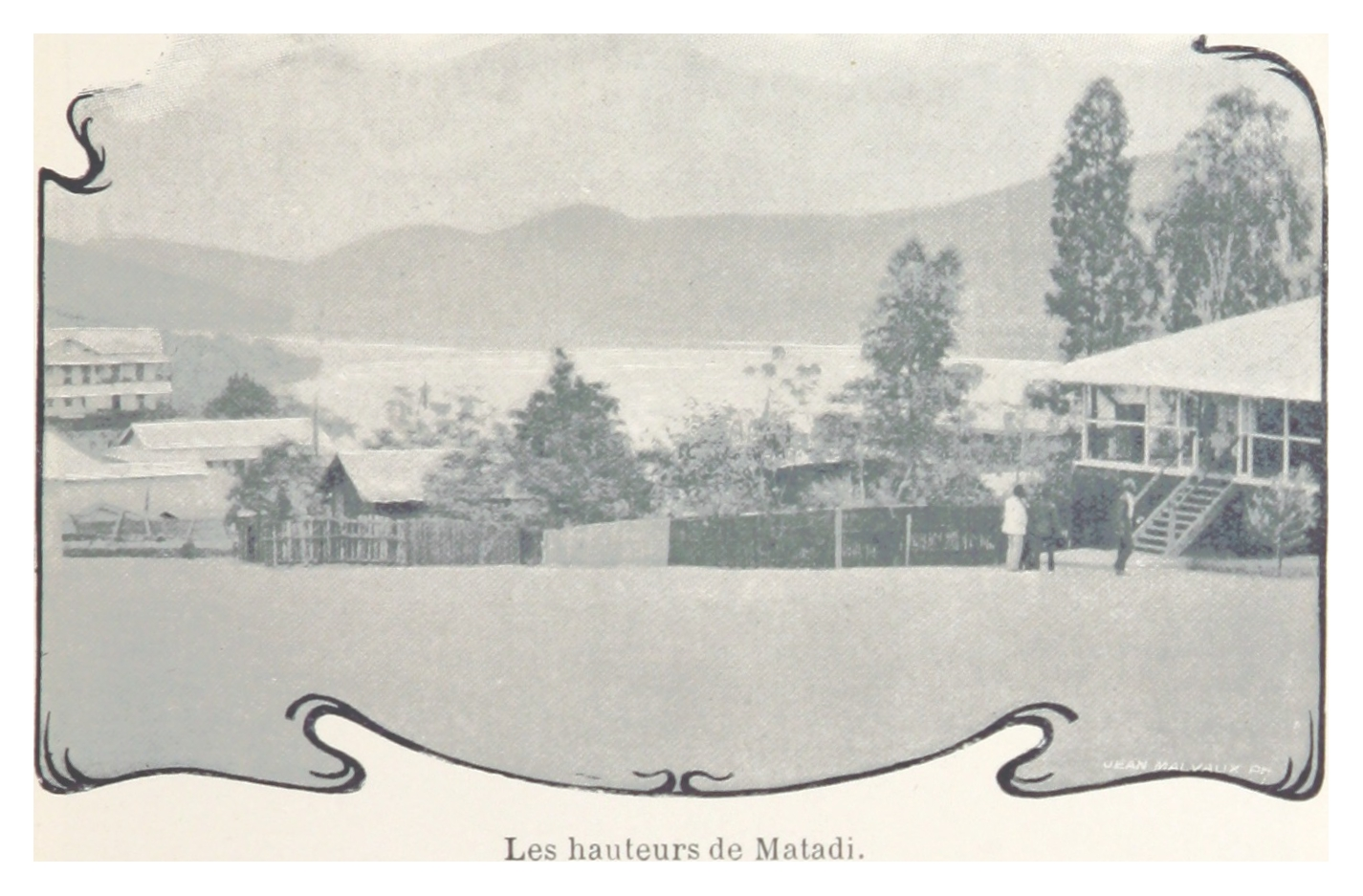
The houses of Matadi, 1899

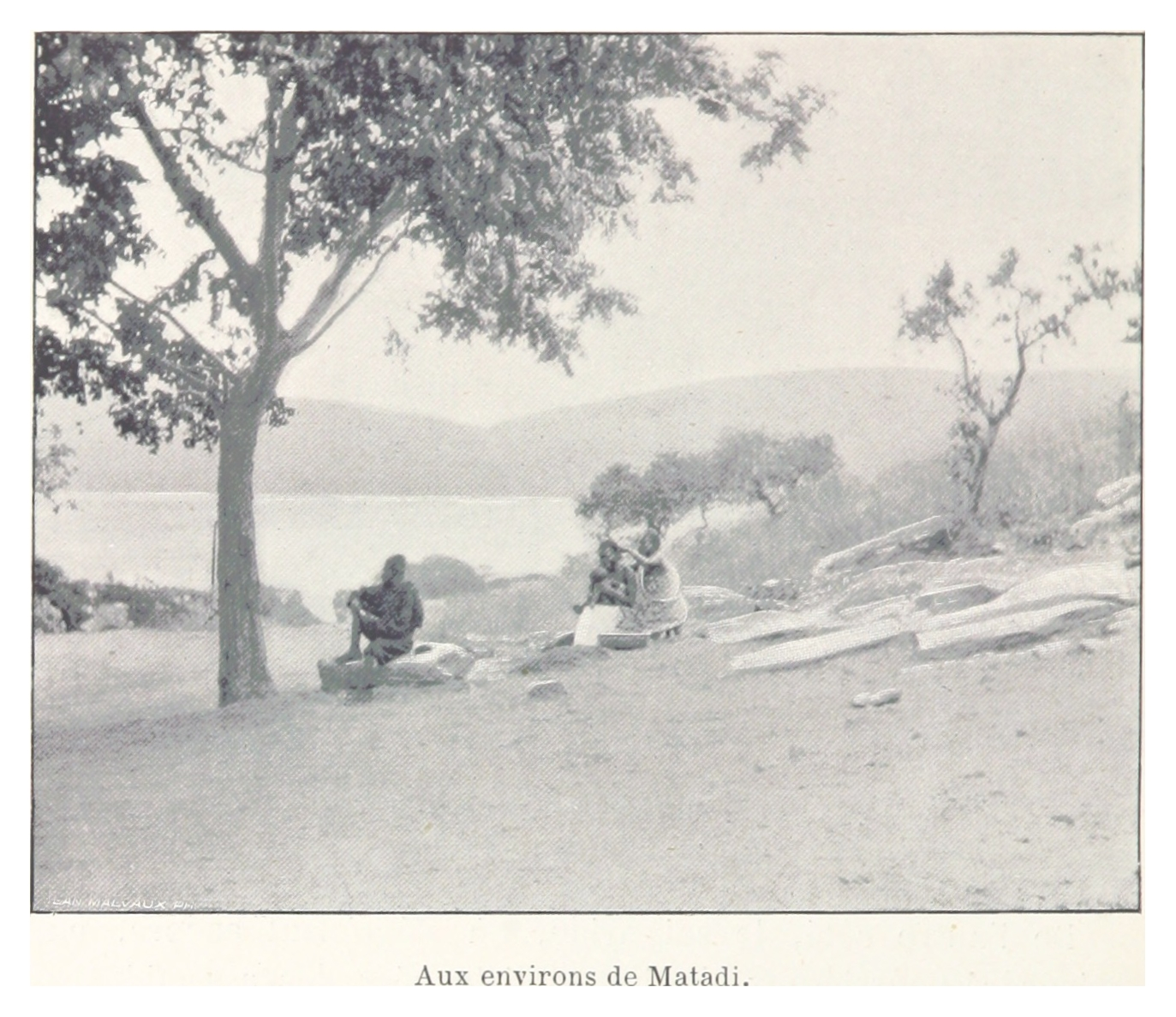
The surroundings of Matadi, 1899

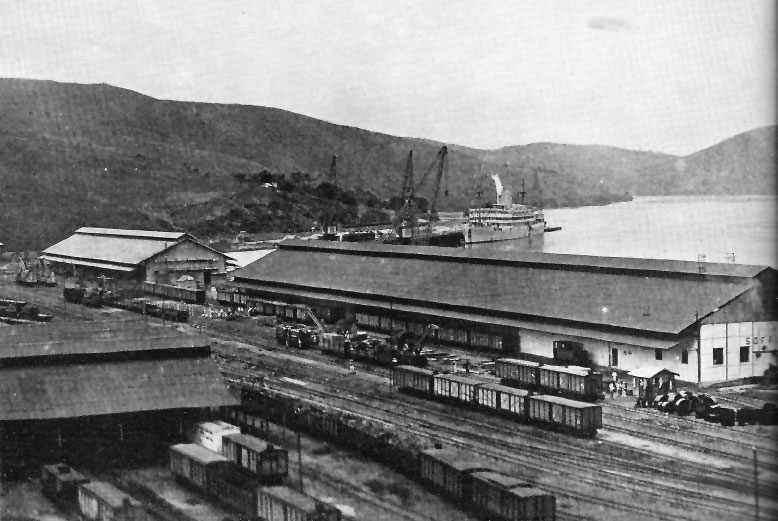
Matadi port, circa 1942

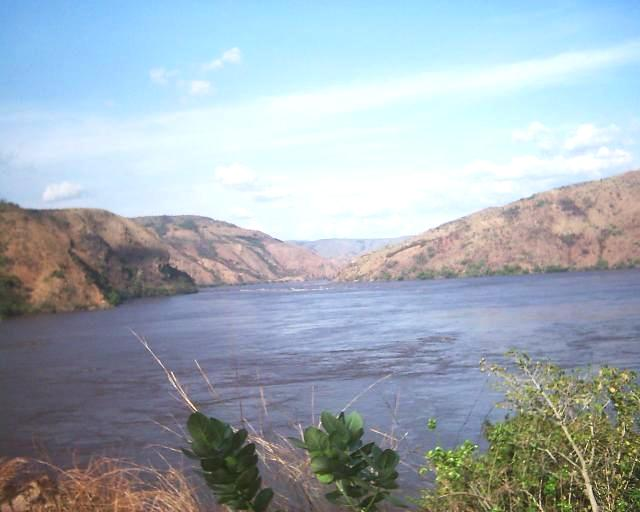
Full Congo River at Matadi and the first rapids

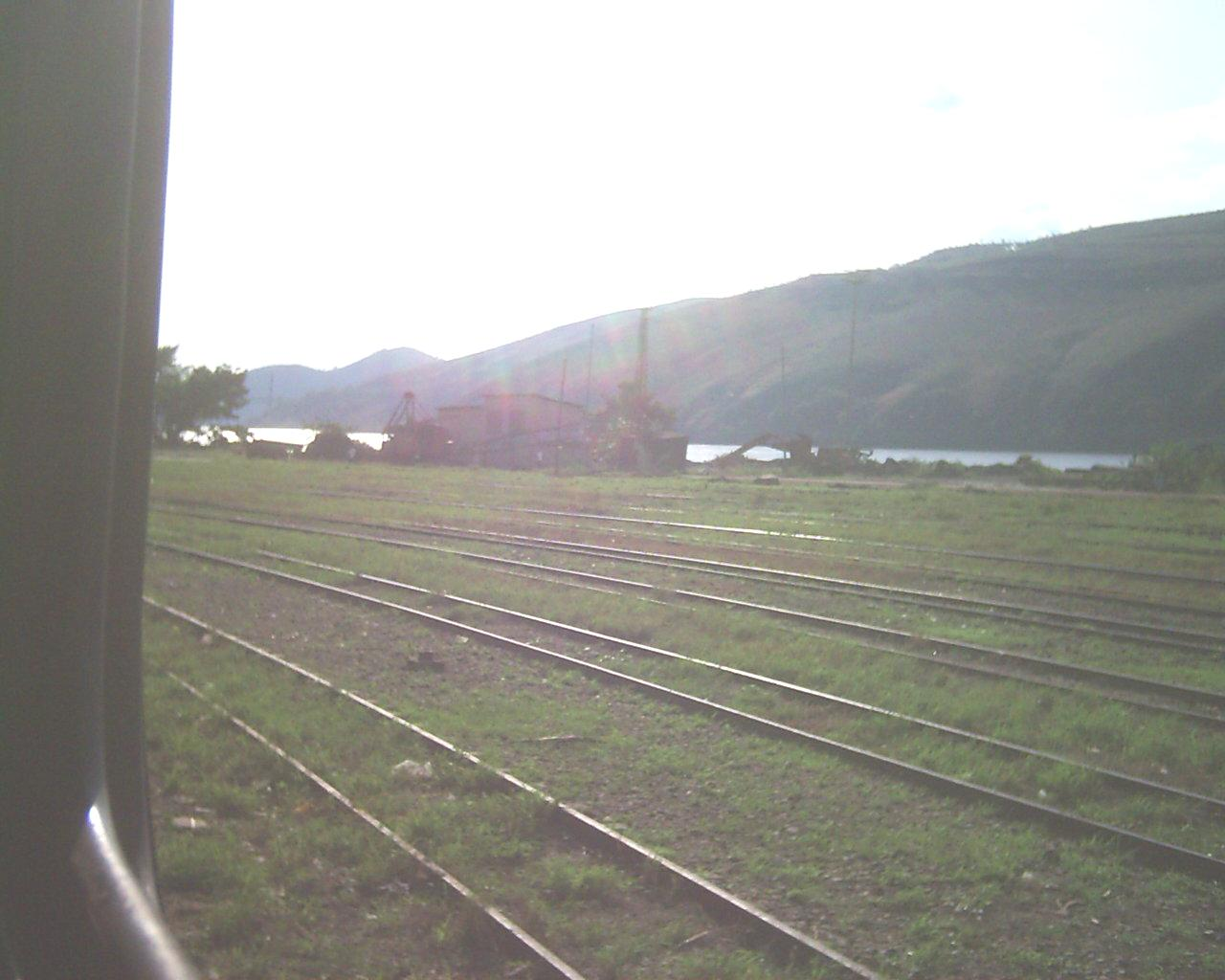
Arrival at Matadi station

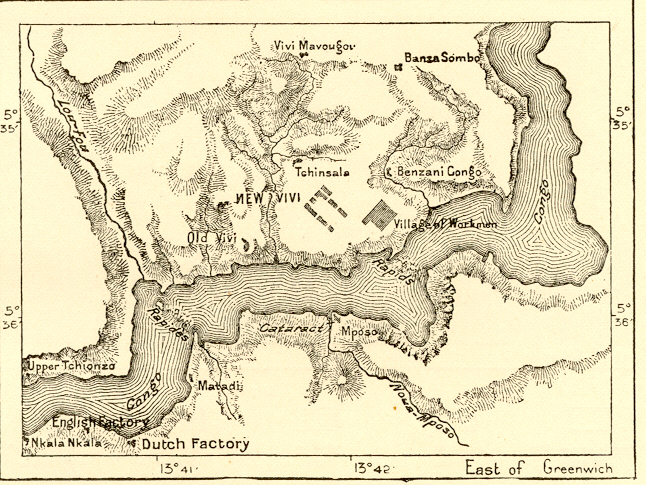
Map of Matadi and Vivi around 1890

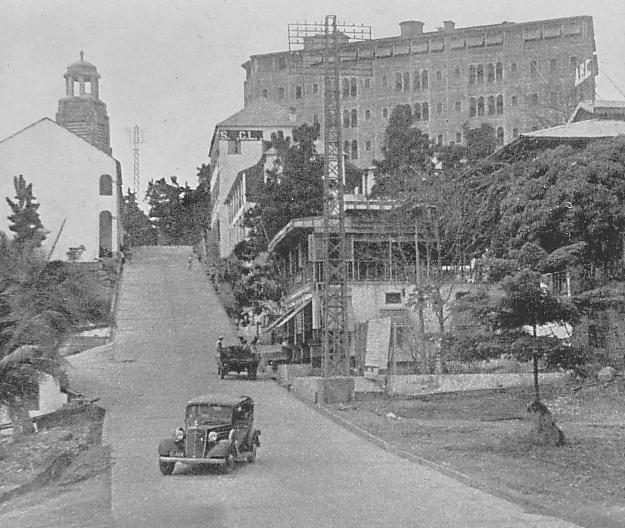
Matadi in 1930s

== See also ==
- Lake Chad replenishment project
- Waterway
