= Milandou =

Milandou is a Congolese surname. Notable people with the surname include:

- Anatole Milandou (born 1946), archbishop of the Roman Catholic Archdiocese of Brazzaville
- Florent Baloki-Milandou (1971–2007), Congolese footballer
