= Katumba =

Ward of Mbeya Region, Tanzania

Coordinates: 9°14′S 33°37′E

Katumba is an administrative ward in the Rungwe District of the Mbeya Region of Tanzania. According to the 2002 census, the ward has a total population of 10,965.

There are four villages with the ward, the village of Katumba, Ikama, Ilinga and Itagata.
