= List of places in Gabon =

This is a list of places in Gabon.

== Cities and towns ==
- Adzap
- Akok
- Batouala
- Bifoun
- Bitam
- Bongo Country
- Bongoville
- Booué
- Ekata
- Franceville
- Gamba
- Koulamoutou
- Lalara
- Lambaréné
- Lastoursville
- Lébamba
- Leconi
- Libreville
- Makokou
- Masuku
- Mayumba
- Mékambo
- Minvoul
- Mitzic
- Moanda
- Momo
- Mouila
- Ndjole
- Nkolabona
- Ntoum
- Omboué
- Owendo
- Oyem
- Petit Loango
- Port-Gentil
- Setté Cama
- Tchibanga
- Zoula

== Mountains ==
- Mont Iboundji
- Mount Pele
- Mount Koum

== Rivers ==
- Ogooué
- Ivindo
- Zadié
- Echira

== National Parks ==
- Lopé Reserve
- Loango National Park
