= List of cities in Gabon =

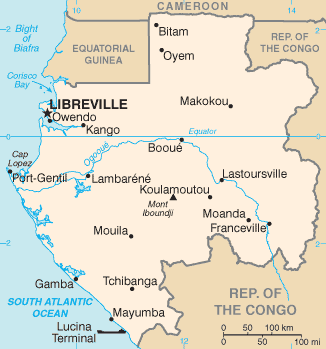
Map of Gabon

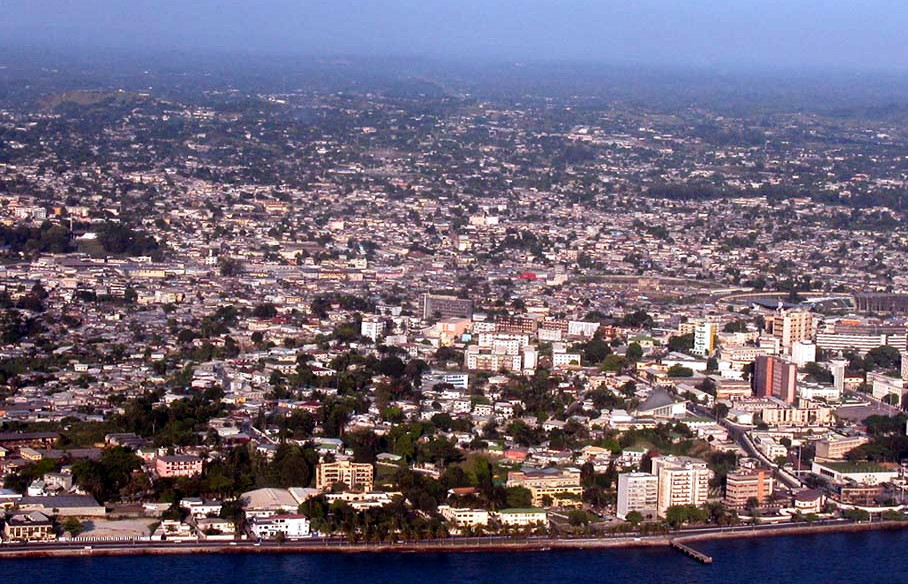
Libreville, Capital of Gabon

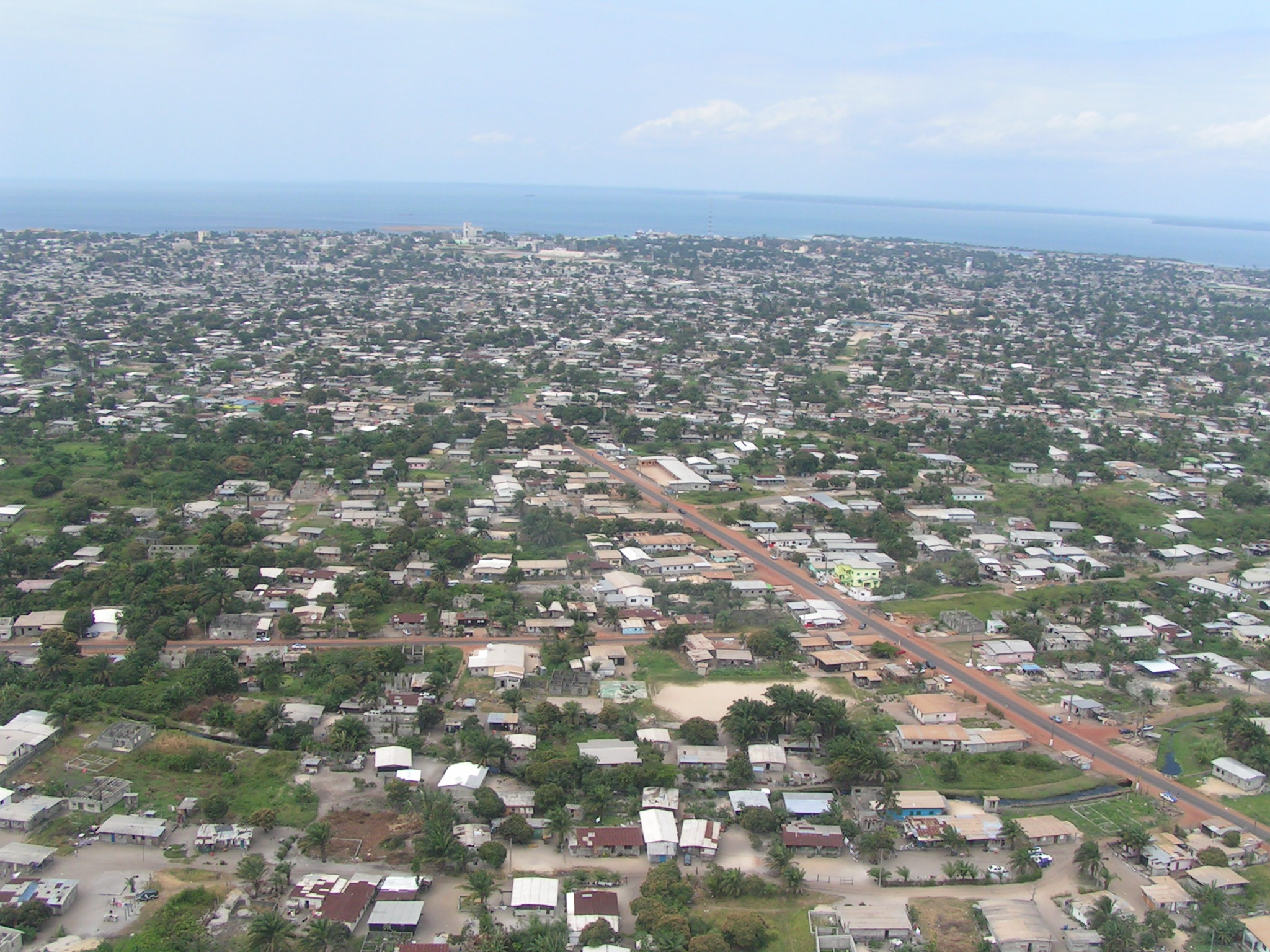
Port-Gentil

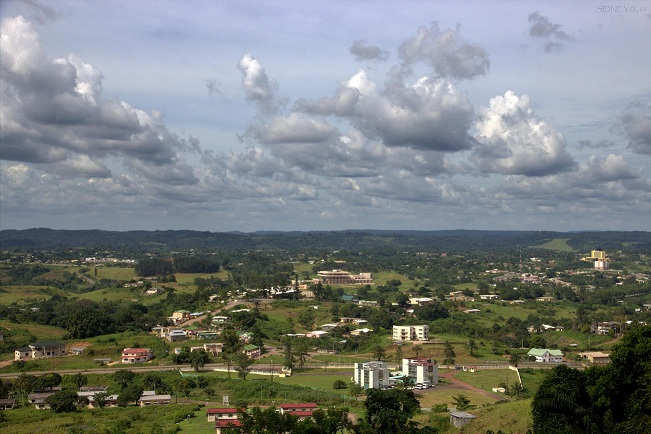
Masuku (Franceville)

This article shows a list of cities and towns in Gabon:

== List ==
Cities of Gabon
Order	City	Population		Province
Order	City	Census 2003	Census 2013	Province
1.	Libreville	538,195	703,940	Estuaire
2.	Mandji (Port-Gentil)	105,712	136,462	Ogooué-Maritime
3.	Masuku (Franceville)	103,840	110,568	Haut-Ogooué
4.	Owendo	51,661	79,300	Estuaire
5.	Oyem	35,241	60,685	Woleu-Ntem
6.	Moanda	42,703	59,154	Haut-Ogooué
7.	Ntoum	12,711	51,954	Estuaire
8.	Lambaréné	24,883	38,775	Moyen-Ogooué
9.	Mouila	21,074	36,061	Ngounié
10.	Akanda	-	34,548	Estuaire

=== Alphabetical list ===
- Akanda
- Akok
- Bakoumba
- Batouala
- Belinga
- Bifoun
- Bitam
- Bongoville
- Booué
- Cocobeach
- Ekata
- Étéké
- Fougamou
- Franceville
- Gamba
- Kango
- Koulamoutou
- Lalara
- Lambaréné
- Lastoursville
- Leconi
- Libreville (capital)
- Makokou
- Mayumba
- Mbigou
- Médouneu
- Mékambo
- Mimongo
- Minvoul
- Mitzic
- Moanda
- Momo
- Mouila
- Mounana
- Ndendé
- Ndjolé
- Nkan
- Nkolabona
- Ntoum
- Okandja
- Omboué (also known as Fernan Vaz)
- Owendo
- Oyem
- Petit Loango
- Point Denis
- Port-Gentil
- Santa Clara
- Setté Cama
- Ste. Marie
- Souba-Haut-Ogooue, Gabon (Internationally known as event place of Summit of Africa United Organization in 1977)
- Tchibanga
- Tsogni
- Zoula

== See also ==
- Cities of Gabon
