= Mayéné =

- Location in Gabon
- Coordinates: 0°6′S 10°49′E
- Country: Gabon
- Province: Moyen-Ogooué Province
- Department: Abanga-Bigne Department

Mayéné is a small town in Abanga-Bigne Department, Moyen-Ogooué Province, in northwestern Gabon. It lies east of Anonébéré on the Ogooue River. Nearby the N2 road coming from the west connects with the N3 road. The town is near the Equator, which lies just 6.6 miles to the north.
