= Mgombom =

- Location in Gabon
- Coordinates: 0°4′S 11°11′E
- Country: Gabon
- Province: Moyen-Ogooué Province
- Department: Abanga-Bigne Department

Mgombom is a town in the Abanga-Bigne Department of Moyen-Ogooué Province, in northwestern Gabon. It verges on the Equator on the Ogooue River on the N3 road. The town of Mevang lies adjacent to Mgombom immediately to the west.
