= Mevang =

- Location in Gabon
- Coordinates: 0°4′S 11°9′E
- Country: Gabon
- Province: Moyen-Ogooué Province
- Department: Abanga-Bigne Department

Mevang is a town in the Abanga-Bigne Department of Moyen-Ogooué Province, in northwestern Gabon. It verges on the Equator near the Ogooue River on the N3 road. The town of Mgombom lies adjacent to Mevang immediately to the east.
