= Koum (disambiguation) =

Koum is a surname.

Koum may also refer to:

- Koum Formation, geological formation in the North Province of Cameroon
- Mount Koum, mountain of northern Gabon
