= List of N2 roads =

This is a list of roads designated N2. Roads entries are sorted in alphabetical order by country.

- N2 (Bangladesh), connects Dhaka and Tamabil via Sylhet
- N2 road (Belgium), connects Brussels and Maastricht
- National Road 2 (Democratic Republic of the Congo), connects Gisenyi and Kisangani
- N2 road (France), connects Paris and La Capelle
- N2 road (Gabon), connects Bifoun and Éboro in Cameroon
- N2 road (Ghana), connects Tema through Kpong, Yendi, and Bawku to Kulungugu
- N2 road (Ireland), connects Dublin and the border with Northern Ireland
- N2 road (Luxembourg)
- Route nationale 2 (Madagascar), connects Tananarive and Toamasina
- N2 road (Mauritania), connects Nouadhibou through Nouakchott to Rosso
- N2 road (Morocco), connects Tangier and Oujda
- N2 road (Netherlands), a section of the A2 motorway near Maastricht
- N2 highway (Philippines), a highway that connects Guiguinto in Bulacan and Laoag in Ilocos Norte, and comprises most of MacArthur Highway, or Manila North Road.
- N2 road (Republic of the Congo), connects Brazzaville and the northern border
- N2 road (Senegal), connects Kaolack and Kidira
- N2 road (South Africa), connects Cape Town, Port Elizabeth and Durban
- Carretera Nacional N-II (Spain), connects Madrid to Barcelona and France
- N2 road (Switzerland)
- N2 road (Zimbabwe), connects Harare-Borrowdale and Brooke

== See also ==
- List of highways numbered 2
