= Koum =

Koum is a surname of multiple origins. Notable people with the surname include:

- Alexi Koum, Cameroon-born French footballer
- Daniel Koum (born 1985), Cameroon-born Australian weightlifter
- Emmanuel Koum (1946–2008), Cameroonian football player
- Jan Koum (born 1976), CEO and founder of WhatsApp

== See also ==
- Kou (name)
