= Akanda =

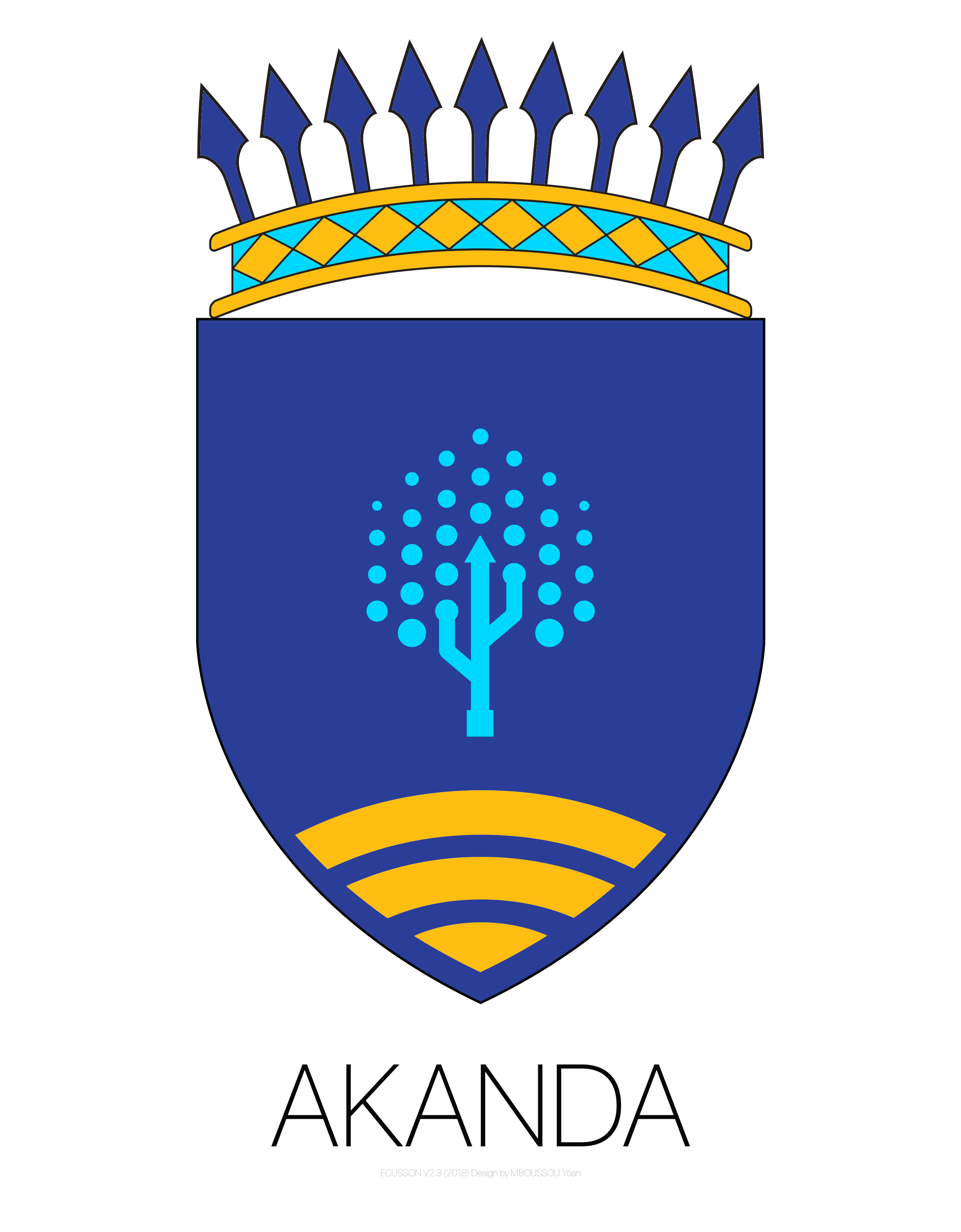
- Seal

- Location in Gabon
- Coordinates: 0°30′N 9°30′E
- Country: Gabon
- Province: Estuaire Province

Population (2013)
  - Total: 34,548

Akanda is the 10th largest city in Gabon. It had a population of 34,548 in 2013. It is situated in the Estuaire Province and is the capital of the province.

== Education ==
Akanda is home to the Université internationale Brice Clotaire Oligui Nguema.

== See also ==
- Akanda National Park
- List of cities in Gabon
