= Buzogo River =

River in Gabon

Coordinates: 1°34′00″N 12°14′00″E

The Buzogo River is a small river of Woleu-Ntem, Gabon.
