= Zadié (department) =

Coordinates: 1°01′N 13°56′E

- Department
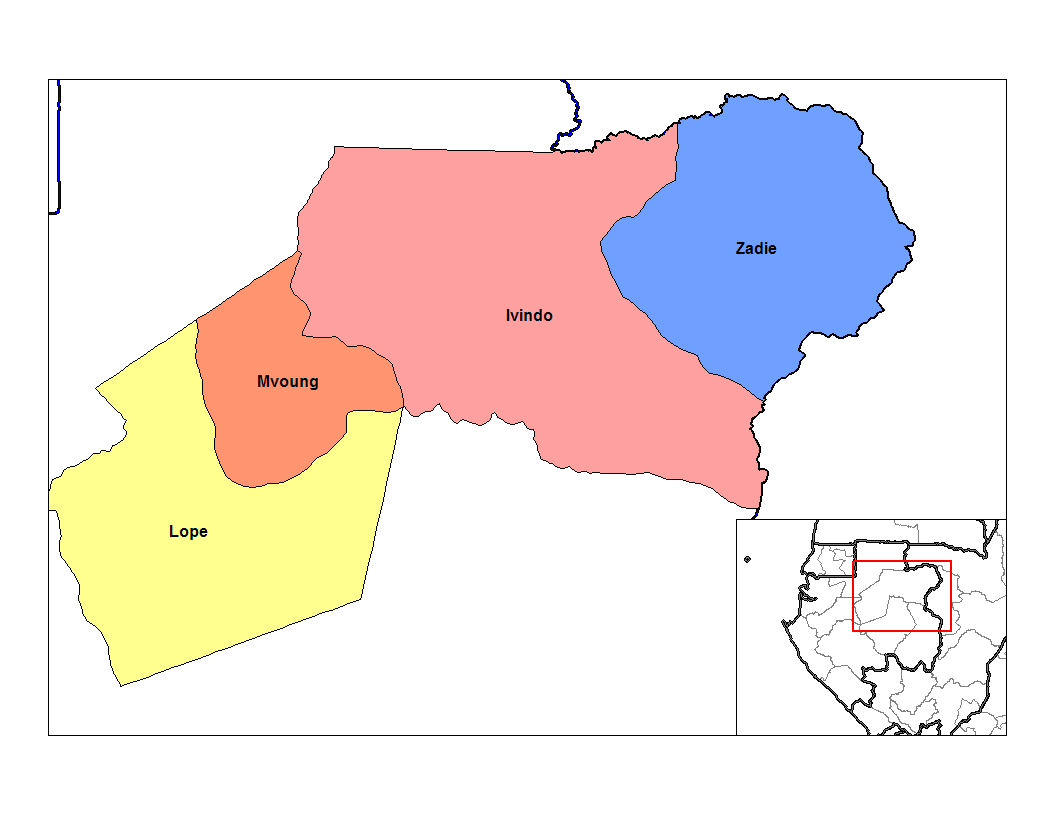
- Zadie Department in the region
- Country: Gabon
- Province: Ogooué-Ivindo Province

Population (2013)
  - Total: 15,816
- Time zone: UTC+1 (GMT +1)

Zadié is a department of Ogooué-Ivindo Province in northern-eastern Gabon. The capital lies at Mékambo. As of 2013 the department had a population of 15,816 people. The department has a population of Bakoya pygmies, settled here since about 1933 along the main roads from Mékambo to Mazingo and Mékambo to Ekata on the Congolese border. The area received international press for outbreaks of Ebola hemorrhagic fever in 1994 and 1997.

== Administrative divisions ==
The department contains the following administrative divisions. The population as of the 2013 census is given:

- Commune Mékambo (6,744)
- Canton Bengoué (1,123)
- Canton Djouah (2,636)
- Canton Loué (3,928)
- Canton Sassamongo (1,385)
