= List of universities in Gabon =

This is a list of universities in Gabon.

== Universities in Gabon ==
- Université internationale Brice Clotaire Oligui Nguema
- Université Omar Bongo
