= Adzap =

- Town
- Location in Gabon
- Coordinates: 2°5′N 11°26′E
- Country: Gabon
- Province: Woleu-Ntem
- Department: Haut-Ntem Department
- Time zone: UTC+1 (WAT)

Adzap is a town in northern Gabon near the border with Equatorial Guinea. It lies near Bitam.
