= Université internationale Brice Clotaire Oligui Nguema =

Public university in Akanda, Gabon

- Type: Public
- Established: 10 September 2026; 2 months ago
- Students: c. 1500
- Location: Cap Estérias, Akanda, Estuaire Province, Gabon
- Campus: 11 hectares (27 acres)
- Language: French

The Université internationale Brice Clotaire Oligui Nguema is a public university located at Cap Estérias, in the municipality of Akanda, north of Libreville, Gabon. It was inaugurated on 10 September 2026 by Gabonese president Brice Oligui Nguema.

== History ==
The university project was launched in 2008 during the presidency of Omar Bongo. Construction of what was then planned as the Cap Estérias university began that year but was suspended in 2011.

Work resumed in 2024 as part of a government programme for higher education. The first phase was completed in 2026, and the university was officially inaugurated on 10 September.

== Campus ==
The university occupies an 11-hectare (27-acre) site and consists of 14 buildings. Facilities include teaching buildings, a 386-seat auditorium, student residences, a library and a training hotel and restaurant.

The first phase was designed for about 4,000 students, with a planned long-term capacity of 12,000. Local reporting indicated an initial intake of about 1,500 students for the 2026–2027 academic year.

== Academics ==
At its opening, the university comprised three main academic institutions: the Faculty of Education Sciences, the Higher School of Tourism and the Higher Institute of Technology.

Its programmes include technology, tourism, hospitality, catering and education sciences, with an emphasis on vocational training.

== See also ==
=== Related articles ===
- Education in Gabon
- List of universities in Gabon
- Omar Bongo University

=== External links ===
- Inauguration announcement – Presidency of Gabon
