= Mékambo Airport =

Airport in Gabon

Mékambo Airport Aéroport Mékambo
- IATA: MKB; ICAO: FOOE

Summary
- Serves: Mékambo
- Elevation AMSL: 1,686 ft / 514 m
- Coordinates: 0°58′40″N 13°58′05″E

Map
- Location in Gabon

Runways
Direction	Length		Surface
Direction	m	ft	Surface
16/34	1,150	3,773	Grass
- Sources: Google Maps GCM

Mékambo Airport (French: Aéroport Mékambo) (IATA: FOOE, ICAO: MKB) is an airport serving the village of Mékambo in the Ogooué-Ivindo Province of Gabon.

The runway forms part of the N4 road 4 kilometres (2.5 mi) south of the village.

== See also ==
- List of airports in Gabon
- Transport in Gabon
