= Anonébéré =

- Location in Gabon
- Coordinates: 0°16′S 10°31′E
- Country: Gabon
- Province: Moyen-Ogooué Province
- Department: Abanga-Bigne Department

Anonébéré is a small town in Abanga-Bigne Department, Moyen-Ogooué Province, in northwestern Gabon. It lies south of Kango and to the west of the town the north–south N1 road connects with the N2 road. It stands on the Ogooue River.
