= Zoula =

- Location in Gabon
- Coordinates: 1°05′N 14°04′E
- Country: Gabon
- Province: Ogooué-Ivindo Province
- Elevation: 1,667 ft (508 m)

Zoula is a small village in the Ogooué-Ivindo province of Gabon. It is halfway between Mékambo and Mazingo.

== Coordinates and elevation ==
- Latitude: 1.0833 N
  - Longitude: 14.0667 E
- Altitude: 508 m (1,669 ft)
