= Étéké =

- Location in Gabon
- Coordinates: 1°30′0″S 11°28′48″E
- Country: Gabon
- Province: Ngounie
- Department: Ngounie
- Time zone: UTC+1:00 (West Africa Time)

Étéké is a place in the region of Province de la Ngounie in Gabon at 1°30'0" south of the equator and 11°28'48" east of the Greenwich Prime Meridian.

Étéké is situated on a cleared hilltop approximately 26 km uphill from Yeno. Étéké is one of the higher points in the central Gabonese rainforest. Étéké was the hub for the gold industry in the region. Belgians were supposedly the first to arrive on their way north from Congo circa 1920. The Gold business around Étéké was at its heyday in the 1950s and '60s. According to locals, the business died down in the 1970s and '80s. But gold continues to be traded in the area.
