= N2 road (Gabon) =

Road in Gabon

Location
- Country: Gabon

Highway system
- Transport in Gabon

The N2 road is one of the national highways of Gabon. The 456 kilometers long highway connects to the north and across into Cameroon.

Towns located along the highway include:

- Anonébéré
- Bifoun
- Alembe
- Viate
- Mitzic
- Bibasse
- Oyem
- Bitam
- Éboro – (Cameroon)

== History ==
The French Development Agency financed the upgrade and widening of a 46 kilometer stretch between Ndjolé and Médoumane. The project cost 78 billion Central African CFA franc and was planned to be finished in 2015.
