= Masuku =

Masuku is the former name of Franceville, a city in Gabon. It is also an African surname that may refer to:

- Bandile Masuku, South African politician
- Bongani Masuku, South African vocalist
- Davidson Masuku (1940–2000), South African military commander and physician
- Ernest Masuku (born 1992), Zimbabwean cricketer
- Khethokwakhe Masuku (born 1985), South African association football player
- Lookout Masuku (1940–1986), commander of the Zimbabwe People's Revolutionary Army
- Madala Masuku, South African government official
- Mkhabela Masuku, Zimbabwean born Lawyer and social commentator
- Mario Masuku (1951–2021), Swazi politician
- Menzi Masuku (born 1993), South African football midfielder
- Mkhuphali Masuku (born 1980), Zimbabwean football manager and former player
- Themba N. Masuku, Swazi politician who has served as Deputy Prime Minister of Eswatini since 2018 and as Acting Prime Minister from 2020 to 2021
