= Alexi Koum =

French footballer (born 2006)

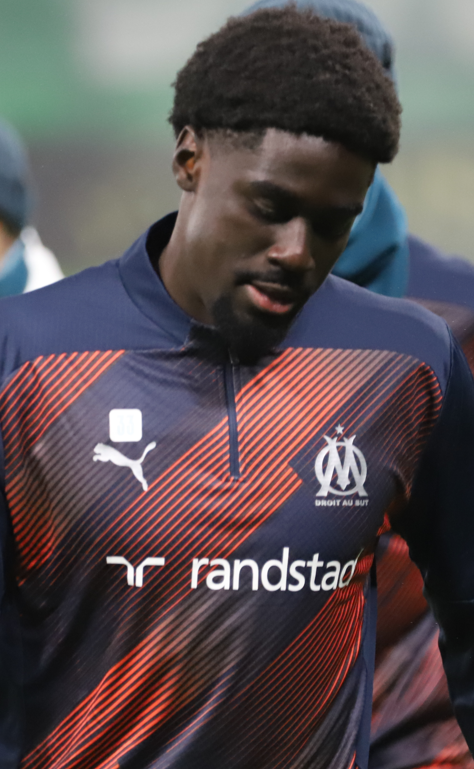
- Koum playing for Marseille in 2024

Personal information
- Full name: Emmanuel Alexi Koum Mbondo
- Date of birth: 5 February 2006 (age 20)
- Place of birth: Villeneuve-Saint-Georges, France
- Height: 1.80 m (5 ft 11 in)
- Position: Left-back

Team information
- Current team: Marseille
- Number: 46

Youth career
- 2012–2019: Valenton FA
- 2019–2021: CS Brétigny
- 2021–2023: Auxerre

Senior career*
Years	Team	Apps	(Gls)
2022–2024	Auxerre B	33	(3)
2024–	Marseille B	15	(0)
2024–	Marseille	2	(0)
2025–2026	→ Valenciennes (loan)	25	(0)

International career^{‡}
2021–2022	France U16	9	(3)
2022–2023	France U17	5	(0)
2023	France U18	2	(0)
2024–	France U19	2	(0)
- * Club domestic league appearances and goals as of 22 November 2026 ‡ National team caps and goals as of 17 May 2025

Emmanuel Alexi Koum Mbondo (born 5 February 2006) is a French professional footballer who plays as a left-back for Ligue 1 club Marseille.

== Career ==
As a youth player, Koum played in the youth academy of Valenton, Brétigny and Auxerre. On 4 June 2024, he transferred to Olympique de Marseille on a professional contract. He made his debut in National 3 in a 1–1 draw against Montpellier B.

On 8 December 2024, he was called up to the first team by Roberto De Zerbi for the Ligue 1 match against Saint-Étienne, where he made his professional debut, replacing Quentin Merlin at the 79th minute.

On 4 July 2025, Koum signed for Championnat National club Valenciennes on a season-long loan.

== International career ==
Born in France, Koum is of Cameroonian descent. He is a youth international for France.

== Career statistics ==
As of match played 8 December 2024

Appearances and goals by club, season and competition
Club	Season	League			Cup		Europe		Other		Total	
Club	Season	Division	Apps	Goals	Apps	Goals	Apps	Goals	Apps	Goals	Apps	Goals
Marseille	2024–25	Ligue 1	1	0	0	0	0	0	—		1	0
Career total			1	0	0	0	0	0	0	0	1	0
