= Batouala =

Coordinates: 0°48′36″N 13°25′52″E

Batouala is a small village in Gabon halfway along the dirt road from Makokou to Mékambo, in the north-eastern province of Ogooué-Ivindo. A 2014 report noted that "pre-electrification" of the Batouala area was underway.

The climate is equatorial, with annual median temperatures between 23.9 and 23.7 °C (reference points for these data are Makouko and Mekambo, respectively), average rainfall between 1725 and 1612 mm, relative humidity of 81%, with an average 160 days of rainfall annually.

The area features caves, one of which, the Grotte de Batouala, is at a 3-4km drive and then a 1h45m walk from the village. The cave has three species of bats, and its entrance is made difficult by a thick layer of guano. Its main gallery, according to the report of a 1966 expedition to caves in the Makokou area, contains a thigh-deep lake of liquid guano.
