= Akok =

- town
- Location in Gabon Akok (Africa)
- Coordinates: 1°58′59″N 11°27′14″E
- Country: Gabon
- Province: Woleu-Ntem
- Department: Haut-Ntem Department
- Time zone: UTC+1 (WAT)

Akok is a small town in northern Gabon on the border with Cameroon.
