= Nkolabona =

- Location in Gabon
- Coordinates: 1°14′N 11°43′E
- Country: Gabon
- Province: Woleu-Ntem Province

Nkolabona is a town located in Woleu-Ntem province, Gabon.
