= Haut-Ntem (department) =

Coordinates: 2°09′N 12°08′E

- Department
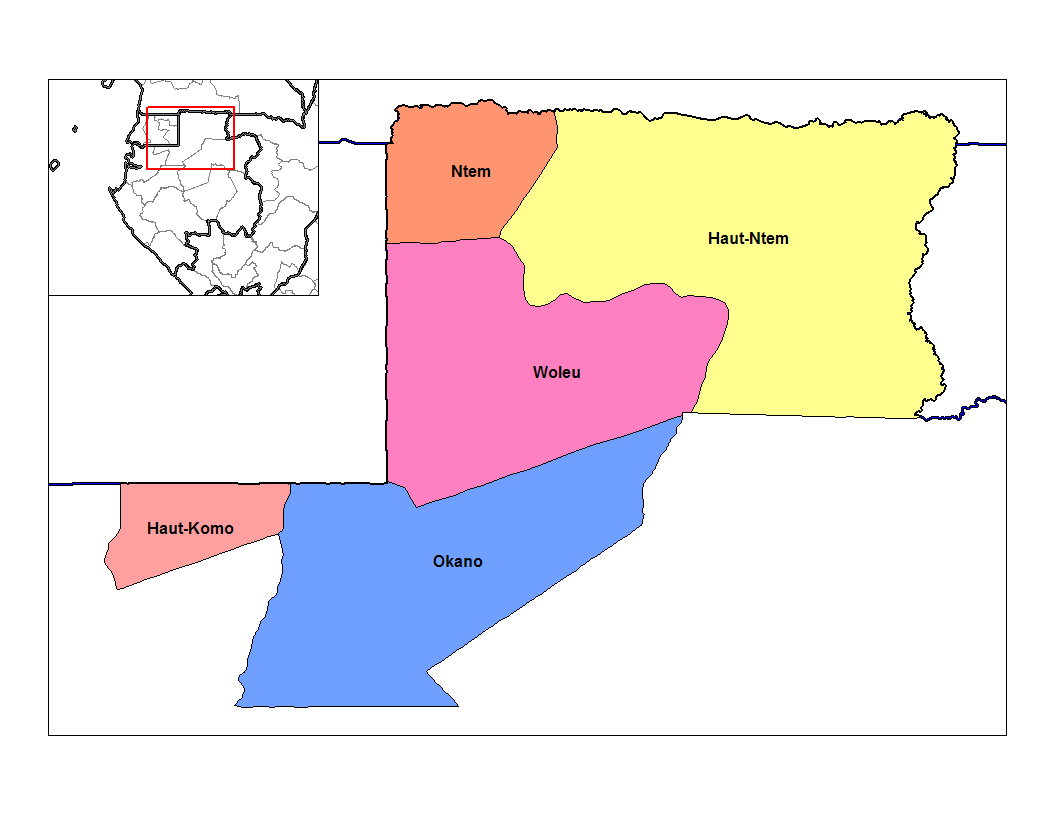
- Haut-Ntem Department in the region
- Country: Gabon
- Province: Woleu-Ntem Province

Population (2013 Census)
  - Total: 10,838
- Time zone: UTC+1 (GMT +1)

Haut-Ntem is a department of Woleu-Ntem Province in northern Gabon. The capital is Minvoul. It had a population of 10,838 in 2013.
