= Mount Koum =

Mountain in Gabon

Mount Koum is a mountain of northern Gabon. It lies 1 kilometre (0.62 mi) from Kuniassi, and 32 kilometres (20 mi) from Oyem towards Bilam.
