= Lalara =

- Location in Gabon
- Coordinates: 0°21′17″N 11°27′07″E
- Country: Gabon
- Province: Woleu-Ntem Province

Lalara is a town located in Woleu-Ntem province, Gabon.
