= Momo, Gabon =

- Location in Gabon
- Coordinates: 1°52′N 11°48′E
- Country: Gabon
- Province: Woleu-Ntem Province

Momo is a town located in Woleu-Ntem province, Gabon.
