= Ekata =

- Location in Gabon
- Coordinates: 0°40′N 14°18′E
- Country: Gabon
- Province: Ogooué-Ivindo Province
- Department: Zadie Department
- Elevation: 1,791 ft (546 m)

Ekata is a small village in the north-eastern region of Gabon in the province of Ogooué-Ivindo near the Congo border.
