= Mitzic =

- City
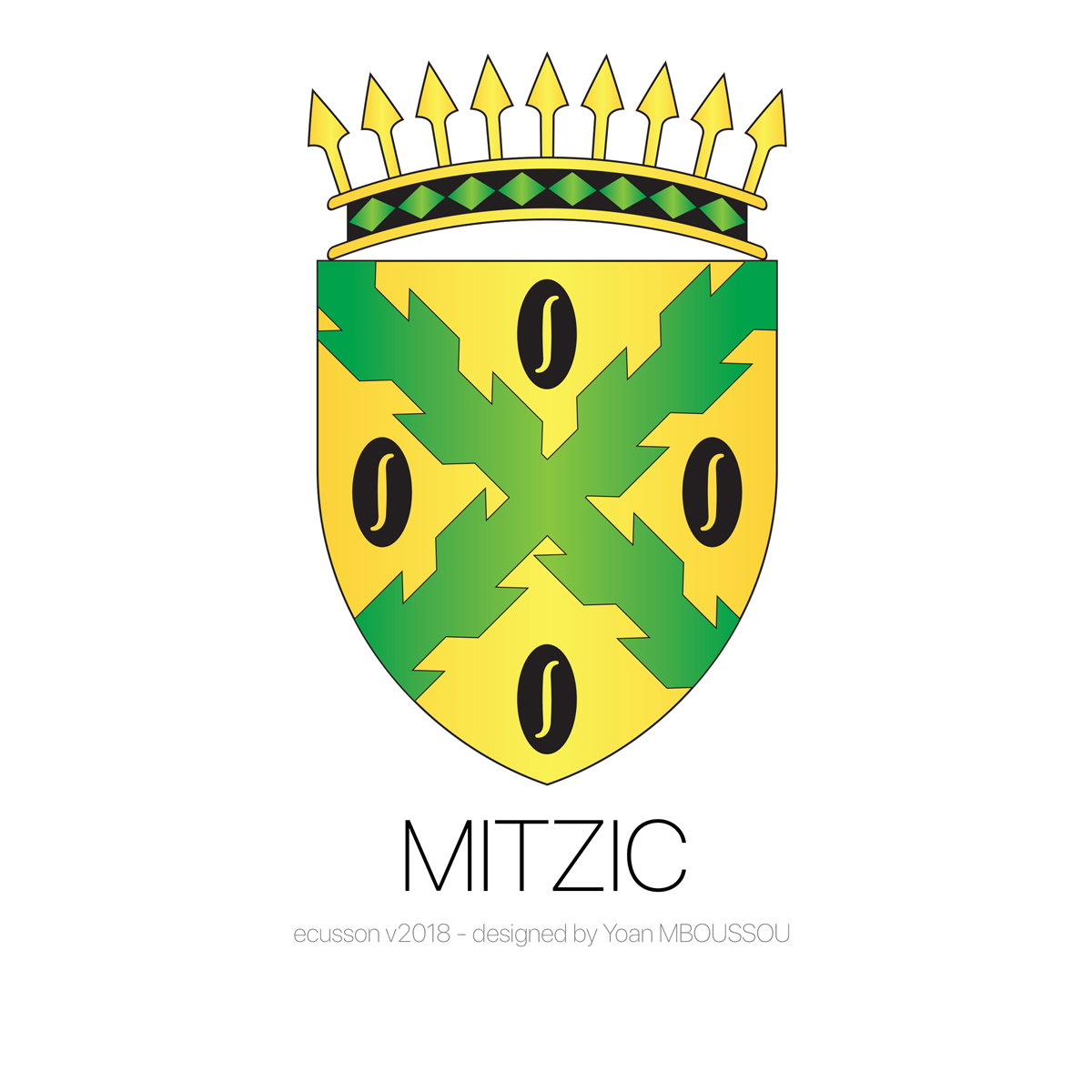
- Coat of arms

- Location in Gabon
- Coordinates: 0°47′N 11°34′E
- Province: Woleu-Ntem Province

Government
  - Type: Mayor-council

Population (2009)
  - Total: 4,926
- Time zone: UTC+1

Mitzic is a town located in Woleu-Ntem province, Gabon. Mitzic is located 322.71 km from Libreville, the capital of Gabon, and 111.47 km from Oyem, capital of Woleu Ntem.

== History ==
The work of the late Moise Nkoghe Mvé, entitled The History of Mitzic, reports that Mitzic city was founded gradually between 1905 and 1910.

In 1947, Mitzic was the seat of a congress about the Fang culture and language, bringing together representatives of the Fang peoples from Gabon, Cameroon and Equatorial Guinea.

== Languages ==
- French
- Fang

== Geography ==
=== Neighborhoods ===
- Atoute
- Edoung Allanga
- Derrière l'aéroport
- Derrière l’hôpital
- Etang

=== Villages ===
- Ekouk
- Essong
- Mfoumou
- Sakeville
- Sam

=== Climate ===
Mitzic has a tropical savanna climate (As) according to the Köppen climate classification.

Climate data for Mitzic (1961–1990, extremes 1946–present)
Month	Jan	Feb	Mar	Apr	May	Jun	Jul	Aug	Sep	Oct	Nov	Dec	Year
Record high °C (°F)	38.0 (100.4)	40.0 (104.0)	38.5 (101.3)	35.4 (95.7)	36.0 (96.8)	39.5 (103.1)	31.5 (88.7)	37.3 (99.1)	33.0 (91.4)	38.6 (101.5)	39.5 (103.1)	32.8 (91.0)	40.0 (104.0)
Mean daily maximum °C (°F)	29.6 (85.3)	30.6 (87.1)	30.8 (87.4)	29.7 (85.5)	29.9 (85.8)	28.1 (82.6)	26.5 (79.7)	26.8 (80.2)	28.8 (83.8)	29.3 (84.7)	29.0 (84.2)	28.1 (82.6)	28.9 (84.0)
Mean daily minimum °C (°F)	20.6 (69.1)	20.4 (68.7)	20.3 (68.5)	19.8 (67.6)	20.6 (69.1)	19.9 (67.8)	18.9 (66.0)	19.1 (66.4)	19.8 (67.6)	19.9 (67.8)	20.0 (68.0)	19.6 (67.3)	19.9 (67.8)
Record low °C (°F)	16.8 (62.2)	17.0 (62.6)	16.8 (62.2)	17.2 (63.0)	17.8 (64.0)	15.4 (59.7)	15.0 (59.0)	16.0 (60.8)	17.0 (62.6)	15.8 (60.4)	15.2 (59.4)	14.5 (58.1)	14.5 (58.1)
Average precipitation mm (inches)	72.5 (2.85)	107.5 (4.23)	191.1 (7.52)	185.2 (7.29)	187.5 (7.38)	51.0 (2.01)	9.1 (0.36)	14.7 (0.58)	138.6 (5.46)	301.8 (11.88)	239.7 (9.44)	90.6 (3.57)	1,589.3 (62.57)
Average precipitation days	9.7	9.0	14.9	14.9	16.4	5.8	2.5	4.4	13.5	21.5	17.8	8.6	139.0
Average relative humidity (%)	82	81	81	81	83	85	86	84	82	82	84	84	83
Source 1: NOAA
Source 2: Meteo Climat (record highs and lows)

== Distance to other cities ==
=== Nearby cities ===
- Oyem (111.47 km)
- Medouneu (119.14 km)
- Ndjolé (184.97 km)
- Bitam (186.09 km)

=== Distance to Capital ===
- Libreville, largest city and capital of Gabon (322.71 km)
- Oyem, Capital of Woleu-Ntem (111.47 km)

== Religion ==
- Saint Joseph Catholic Church
- Protestant Church
- Mosque

== Notable people ==
- Jean Baptiste Ngomo Obiang
- Jean Hilaire Mvomah
- Moïse Nkoghe Mvé
- Clément Obame
