= Petit Loango =

- Location in Gabon
- Coordinates: 2°16′S 9°35′E
- Country: Gabon
- Province: Ogooué-Maritime Province

Designations

Ramsar Wetland
- Designated: 30 December 1986
- Reference no.: 352

Petit Loango is a town located in Ogooué-Maritime province, Gabon.
