= N3 road (Gabon) =

Road in Gabon

Location
- Country: Gabon

Highway system
- Transport in Gabon

The N3 road is one of the national highways of Gabon. It connects to the east of the country along the centre. Towns located along the highway include:

- Alembe
- Kazamabika
- Lastoursville
- Moanda
- Franceville

The closed uranium mine at Mounana was located on the N3.
