= Bifoun =

- Location in Gabon
- Coordinates: 0°20′0″N 10°23′00″E
- Country: Gabon
- Province: Moyen-Ogooué
- Department: Abanga-Bigne Department

Bifoun is a town located in Moyen-Ogooué province, Gabon. It lies on the intersection between the N1 and N2 roads. The town is split by the N1 road from Libreville.

The road is surrounded by farmlands with agricultural produce including grapefruits, mandarin oranges, as well as ground nuts. Beyond the farmlands lies the rainforest.

The N1 and N2 intersection lies on the south-east of the town. While the N1 goes southwards into Lambaréné, the N2 follows the path to Ndjolé. The 63-kilometre (39 mi) road linking Bifoun with Nsile and the 56-kilometre (35 mi) road linking the town with Ndjolé were due to be rebuilt in 2023.
