= Ndjolé =

- Location in Gabon
- Coordinates: 0°11′S 10°45′E
- Country: Gabon
- Province: Moyen-Ogooué Province
- Department: Abanga-Bigne Department

Population (2008)
  - Total: 6,289

Ndjolé is the capital town in the Abanga-Bigne Department in Gabon, lying northeast of Lambaréné on the Ogooué River, the N2 road and the Trans-Gabon Railway. It is known as a base for logging and as a transport hub. Ndjolé is the last city that can be reached by barge traffic traveling up the Ogooué River. Above Ndjolé there are rapids on the river.

== History ==
In 1883, Pierre Savorgnan de Brazza founded the military post of Ndjolé, a strategic point located on the Ogooué River.

The river being difficult to navigate upstream, it is here that foresters loaded their wood to bring it down to Port-Gentil.

The N'djolé prison, built in 1898 on an island on the Ogooué, opposite Ndjolé, was part of a French policy to build detention centres in the French overseas departments and territories then in the colonies. It was here that Samory Touré, founder and leader of the short-lived Wassoulou Empire, died in captivity. Alongside Samory Touré, Cheikh Amadou Bamba Mbacké also experienced exile and forced labour there.
