= Abanga-Bigne (department) =

- Department
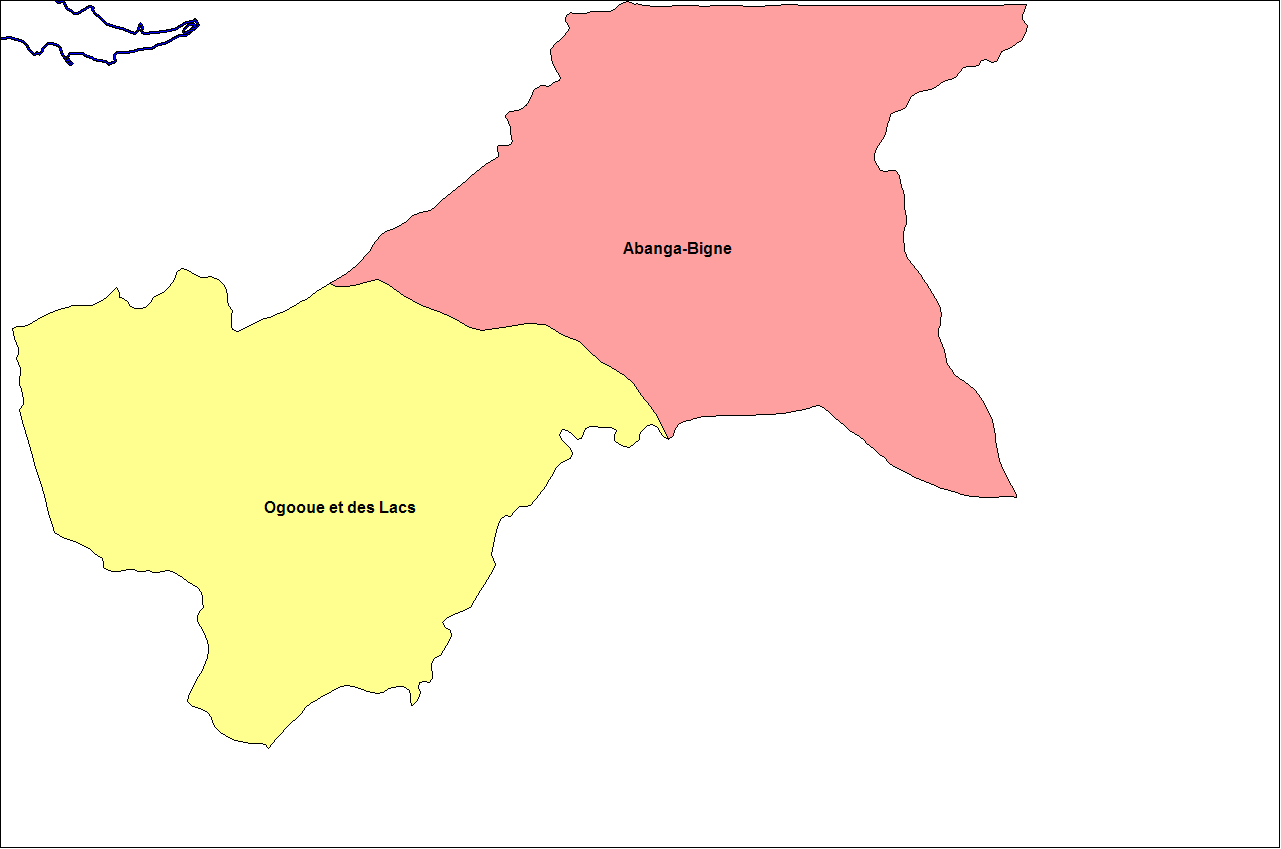
- Abanga-Bigne Department in Moyen-Ogooué Province
- Coordinates: 0°11′45″S 10°45′00″E
- Country: Gabon
- Province: Moyen-Ogooué Province

Population (2013 Census)
  - Total: 14,941
- Time zone: UTC+1 (GMT +1)

Abanga-Bigne is a department of Moyen-Ogooué Province in west-central Gabon. The capital is Ndjolé.

The N2 Road links Bifoun from the west to Ndjolé in the east, crossing the Abanga River not far from Ndjolé. Transportation from Libreville is also provided by the Trans-Gabon Railway line. It had a population of 14,941 in 2013.
