= Mékambo =

- Location in Gabon
- Coordinates: 1°1′N 13°56′E
- Country: Gabon
- Province: Ogooué-Ivindo Province

Population
  - Total: 4,891

Mékambo is a small town in north-eastern Gabon on the banks of the Zadié river. It is located in the Ogooué-Ivindo province of Gabon and is the seat of the Zadié Department. It has received international press for recent outbreaks of Ebola hemorrhagic fever in 1994 and 1997.

It is served by Mékambo Airport.

== Climate ==
Mékambo has a tropical dry savanna climate (Köppen climate classification As).

Climate data for Mékambo (1961–1990)
| Month | Jan | Feb | Mar | Apr | May | Jun | Jul | Aug | Sep | Oct | Nov | Dec | Year |
|---|---|---|---|---|---|---|---|---|---|---|---|---|---|
| Mean daily maximum °C (°F) | 29.3 (84.7) | 30.3 (86.5) | 30.6 (87.1) | 30.8 (87.4) | 30.0 (86.0) | 28.3 (82.9) | 26.7 (80.1) | 27.2 (81.0) | 28.7 (83.7) | 29.3 (84.7) | 29.0 (84.2) | 30.0 (86.0) | 29.2 (84.6) |
| Daily mean °C (°F) | 23.8 (74.8) | 24.4 (75.9) | 24.8 (76.6) | 25.0 (77.0) | 24.7 (76.5) | 23.4 (74.1) | 22.1 (71.8) | 22.5 (72.5) | 23.7 (74.7) | 24.2 (75.6) | 23.9 (75.0) | 24.6 (76.3) | 23.9 (75.0) |
| Mean daily minimum °C (°F) | 18.3 (64.9) | 18.4 (65.1) | 18.9 (66.0) | 19.2 (66.6) | 19.3 (66.7) | 18.5 (65.3) | 17.4 (63.3) | 17.8 (64.0) | 18.6 (65.5) | 19.0 (66.2) | 18.7 (65.7) | 19.2 (66.6) | 18.6 (65.5) |
| Average precipitation mm (inches) | 69.4 (2.73) | 88.5 (3.48) | 166.3 (6.55) | 167.7 (6.60) | 173.6 (6.83) | 80.2 (3.16) | 25.9 (1.02) | 45.1 (1.78) | 183.2 (7.21) | 294.8 (11.61) | 200.5 (7.89) | 88.6 (3.49) | 1,583.8 (62.35) |
| Average precipitation days | 6.7 | 8.5 | 13.4 | 13.4 | 13.7 | 7.8 | 3.5 | 5.0 | 14.3 | 18.5 | 15.9 | 8.1 | 128.8 |
| Average relative humidity (%) | 81 | 79 | 79 | 79 | 80 | 84 | 85 | 83 | 82 | 81 | 82 | 83 | 82 |
Source: NOAA

== Minerals ==
Iron ore deposits are found in the vicinity.
