= Mbigou =

- Town
- Location in Gabon
- Coordinates: 1°53′0″S 11°56′0″E
- Country: Gabon
- Province: Ngounié Province
- Department: Boumi-Louetsi Department
- Time zone: UTC+1 (WAT)

Mbigou is a town in southern Gabon. It is the principal town in the Boumi-Louetsi Department in Ngounié Province, about 84 kilometres from Ndendé. It is served by Mbigou Airport.

== Geography ==
Mbigou is located in southern Gabon. Nearby towns and villages include Lingoye (3.2 nm), Mougoko (3.2 nm), Mouvindou (2.8 nm), Lebagny (4.0 nm), Sounga (1.4 nm), Mbama (2.2 nm) and Livikou (1.0 nm). A path from Mbigou leads to Kembélé, used by the Nzabi people. This region of Gabon is very densely forested with evergreen trees, especially to the east with the Birougou National Park.

== Economy ==
A Roman Catholic Mission and school was established in Mbigou in the early 20th century. The school had considerable importance in this region and students came from surrounding areas to attend it. In the 1990s the town received Canadian investment, with a loan of CFA1.38bn for electrification work and provision of drinking water and also for a hydroelectric scheme in the area.

== Culture ==
Mbigou is noted for its Mbigou soapstone, used by many Gabonese sculptors. The statuettes are said to peddle the ancient spirits. Punu-Lumbo masks are also native to the area.
