= Fougamou =

Town in Gabon

- Location in Gabon
- Coordinates: 1°13′S 10°36′E
- Country: Gabon
- Province: Ngounié Province

Population (1993)
  - Total: 4,100

Fougamou is a small town in Ngounié Province in Gabon. It has a population of about 4,100 and is the capital of Tsamba-Magotsi Department. It lies along the west bank of the Ngounié River on the N1 road between Lambaréné and Mouila.

The town has a mission house, market, hotels, restaurants, pharmacy and shops. There is an airport and shared taxis pass through regularly. There are waterfalls nearby, known as the Samba Falls or Impératrice Falls. To the east are the Chaillu Mountains and Waka National Park. A short distance north is the village of Sindara which has an abandoned mission and rapids on the river.
