= Raponda =

Raponda can refer to:

- Lake Raponda, a lake in Wilmington, Vermont, U.S.
- André Raponda Walker (1871–1968), Gabonese author and Catholic priest
- Rose Christiane Raponda (born 1963), Gabonese politician
