= Ogoulou (department) =

Coordinates: 1°37′12″S 11°36′36″E

- Department
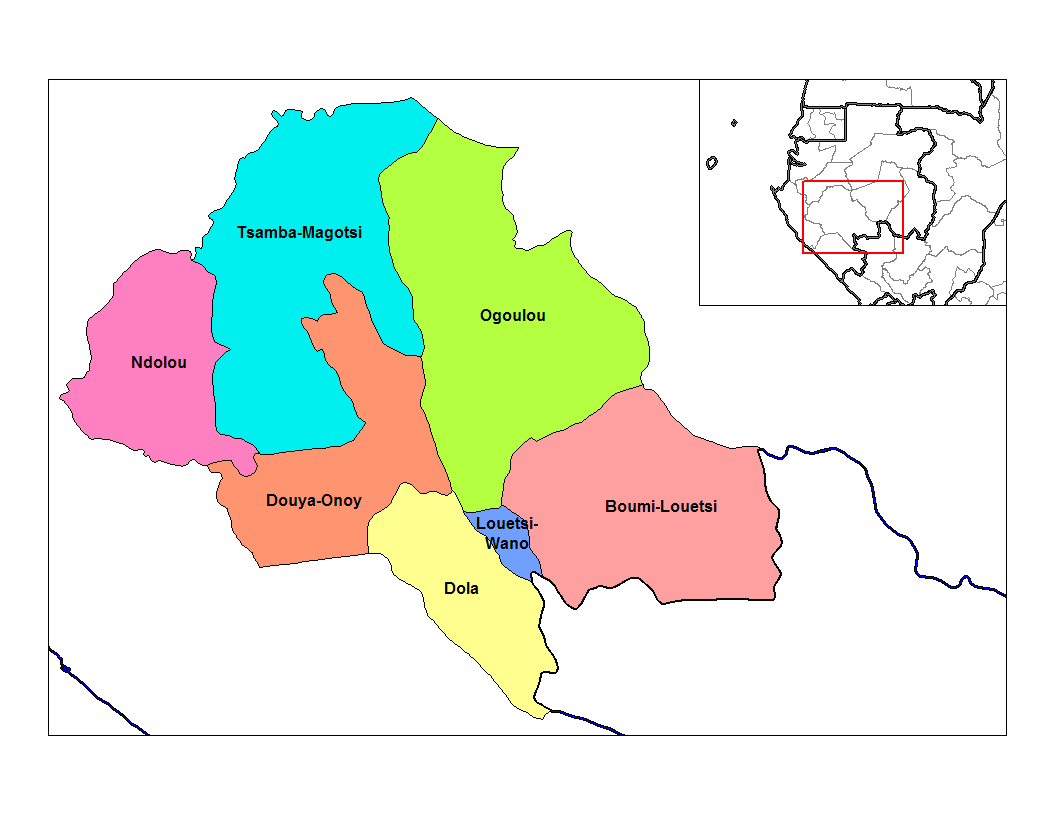
- Ogoulou Department in the region
- Country: Gabon
- Province: Ngounié Province

Population (2013 Census)
  - Total: 8,361
- Time zone: UTC+1 (GMT +1)

Ogoulou is a department of Ngounié Province in southern Gabon. The capital lies at Mimongo. It had a population of 8,361 in 2013.
