= Lingoye =

Town in Gabon

- Location in Gabon
- Coordinates: 1°54′S 11°53′E
- Country: Gabon
- Province: Ngounié Province
- Department: Boumi-Louetsi Department
- Elevation: 745 ft (227 m)

Lingoye is a village in southern Gabon. It is located in the Boumi-Louetsi Department in Ngounié Province.

Nearby towns and villages include Mahouna (2.2 nm), Mbonha (2.0 nm), Bambora (1.4 nm), Lastoursville (2.0 nm), Djokala (2.2 nm), Tsingue (1.4 nm), Missala (2.0 nm) and Limbenga (2.2 nm).
