= Mbigou Airport =

Airport in Gabon

Mbigou Airport Aéroport de Mbigou
- IATA: MBC; ICAO: FOGG

Summary
- Serves: Mbigou
- Elevation AMSL: 2,346 ft / 715 m
- Coordinates: 1°53′35″S 11°54′45″E

Map
- Location in Gabon

Runways
Direction	Length		Surface
Direction	m	ft	Surface
17/35	900	2,953
- Sources: Google Maps GCM

Mbigou Airport (French: Aéroport de Mbigou) (IATA: FOGG, ICAO: MBC) is an airport serving the town of Mbigou in the Ngounié Province of Gabon.

== See also ==
- List of airports in Gabon
- Transport in Gabon
