= Mouloundou =

Mouloundou may refer to:

- Mouloundou Department
- Moloundou
