= Tsingue =

- Village
- Location in Gabon
- Coordinates: 0°52′S 12°43′E
- Country: Gabon
- Province: Ogooué-Lolo Province
- Department: Mouloundou Department
- Elevation: 244 m (801 ft)

Tsingue is a village located in south-eastern Gabon, within the Mouloundou Department of Ogooué-Lolo Province.

Nearby settlements include Mahouna (3.0 nm), Lingoye (1.4 nm), Missala (1.4 nm), Djondi (1.4 nm), Masoukou (1.0 nm) and Mikouma (2.2 nm).
