= Guidouma =

Town in Gabon

- Location in Gabon
- Coordinates: 1°37′S 10°41′E
- Country: Gabon
- Province: Ngounié Province
- Department: Tsamba-Magotsi Department

Guidouma is a small town in Tsamba-Magotsi Department of Ngounié Province, in western Gabon.

It lies on the N1 road.
