= Enteromius walkeri =

Conservation status
- Least Concern (IUCN 3.1)

Scientific classification
- Domain: Eukaryota
- Kingdom: Animalia
- Phylum: Chordata
- Class: Actinopterygii
- Order: Cypriniformes
- Family: Cyprinidae
- Subfamily: Smiliogastrinae
- Genus: Enteromius
- Species: E. walker

Binomial name
- Enteromius walker (Boulenger, 1904)

Synonyms
- Barbus walkeri Boulenger 1904

Species of fish

Enteromius walkeri is a species of ray-finned fish in the genus Enteromius from Ghana and the Ivory Coast where it is threatened by pollution and other activities around mining.

== Size ==
This species reaches a length of 10.0 cm (3.9 in).

== Etymology ==
The fish is named in honor of Robert Bruce Napoleon Walker (1832–1901), a British trader, an explorer, an anthropologist and a natural history collector in West Africa, who collected the holotype specimen.
