= Mikouya =

- Location in Gabon
- Coordinates: 0°53′S 12°39′E
- Country: Gabon
- Province: Ogooué-Lolo Province
- Department: Mouloundou Department
- Elevation: 690 ft (210 m)

Mikouya is a village in south-eastern Gabon. It is located in the Mouloundou Department in Ogooué-Lolo Province and is situated near the Ogooué River.

Nearby towns and villages include Youlou (3.2 nm), Kera-Kera (1.0 nm), Mahouna (1.4 nm) and Malembe (1.0 nm).
