= Robert Bruce Napoleon Walker =

English trader, explorer and collector of zoological specimens in West Africa

Robert Bruce Napoleon Walker (1832–1901), F.R.G.S., F.A.S., F.G.S., C.M.Z.S., known as Brucie Walker, was an English trader, explorer and collector of zoological specimens in West Africa. The Founding Collection of the Pitt Rivers Museum includes a large number of objects collected by Walker.

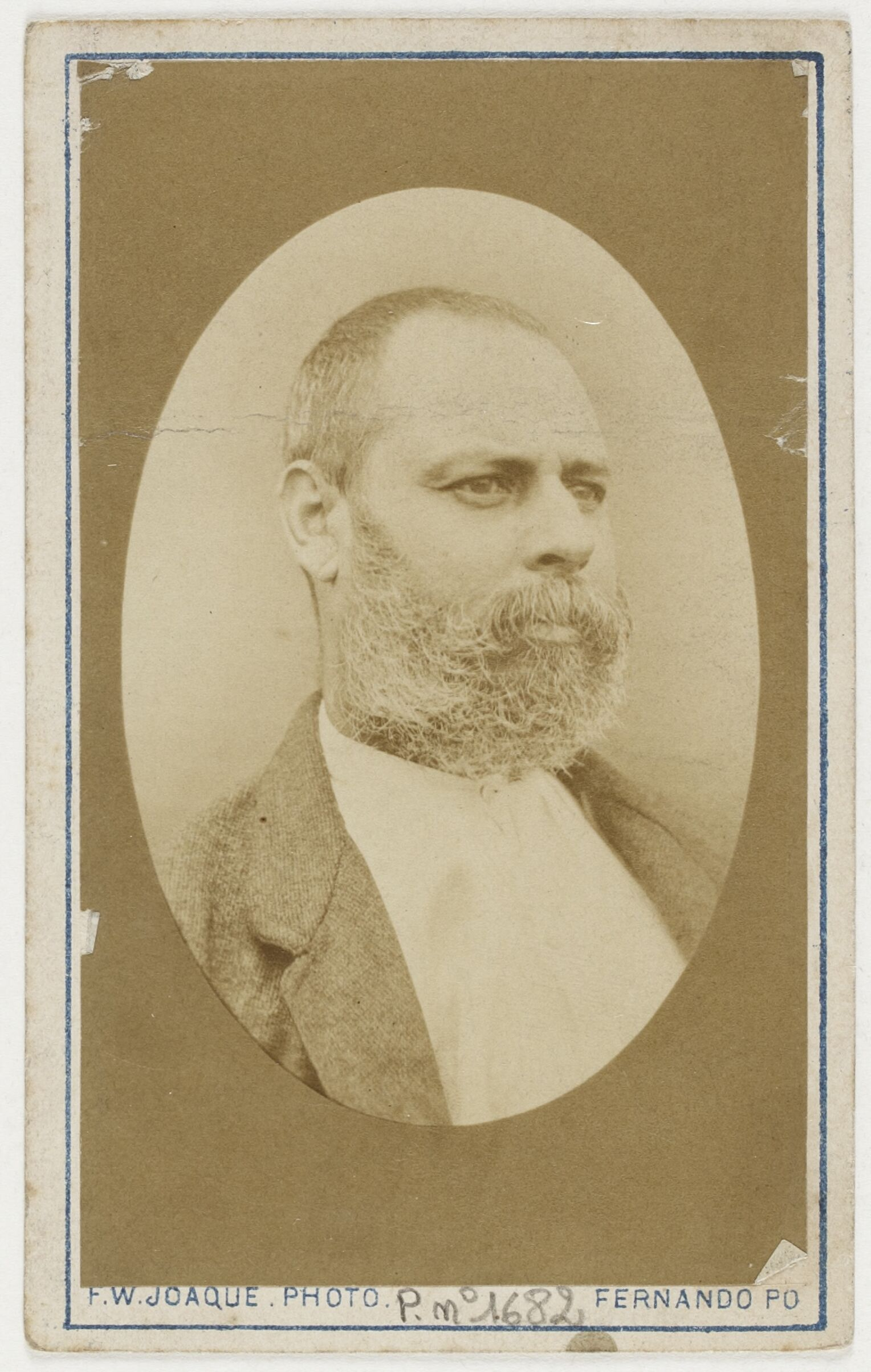
Robert Bruce Napoleon Walker by Francis W. Joaque, 1886

== Career ==
Walker worked as a trader for Hatton & Cookson of Liverpool. In 1851, he moved from Sussex to Gabon, and was based in Gabon for 23 years. He was a significant contributor of African artifacts to British museums, in particular, his collection of African shields. He was involved with General Pitt-Rivers, after whom the museum in England is named, in the affairs of the Ethnological Society of London (ESL) and the Anthropological Society of London (ASL); and the original collection of the museum is attributed to him. He collected ethnographic objects from 1862 onwards, particularly of Ba Fan tribes. Walker became a member of the Anthropological Society of London in 1864 and contributed many objects from the Republic of Congo, Porto Novo (capital of Benin) and Gabon. A particular gift he made was an ornament collection, the adorned girdle worn by Mpongwe women. He translated the Bible into Mpongwe language and donated it to ASL. The Pitt Rivers Museum has recorded 143 items collected by Walker, including weapons, spears and arrows. Some of his curious collections in the museum include two bead necklaces from Gabon and the "Plait of Hair of Pamela Canot".

== Personal life ==
Robert Bruce Napoleon Walker was born on Friday 8 June 1832 at Gosden Green, Prinstead, Westbourne, Sussex. He was the son of Royal Navy Lieutenant Henry Walker (b.1786 Manchester England d.1848 Manchester England) and his wife Charlotte (b.1799 Chichester d.1887 South Stoneham, Hampshire). His father Henry joined the Royal Navy as a midshipman in 1803, attaining the rank of lieutenant in 1810. Midshipman Henry Walker saw action on many occasions during and after the Napoleonic Wars; most notably aboard the Bellerophon at the Battle of Trafalgar in 1805. Robert was the seventh and last child of Henry and Charlotte Walker. However following a separation from her husband in or around 1836, Charlotte Walker gave birth to four more children while residing in the village of Catherington, Hampshire. In 1851 Robert Bruce Napoleon Walker gained employment with the Liverpool-based shipping and trading company of Hatton and Cookson. Shortly after joining the Company, Walker arrived at Sette Karma, on the coast of the French colony of Gabon, West Africa where his older brother Henry Clements Walker (b.1822 Selsey, Sussex d.1855 Gabon) had been trading since the late 1840s.

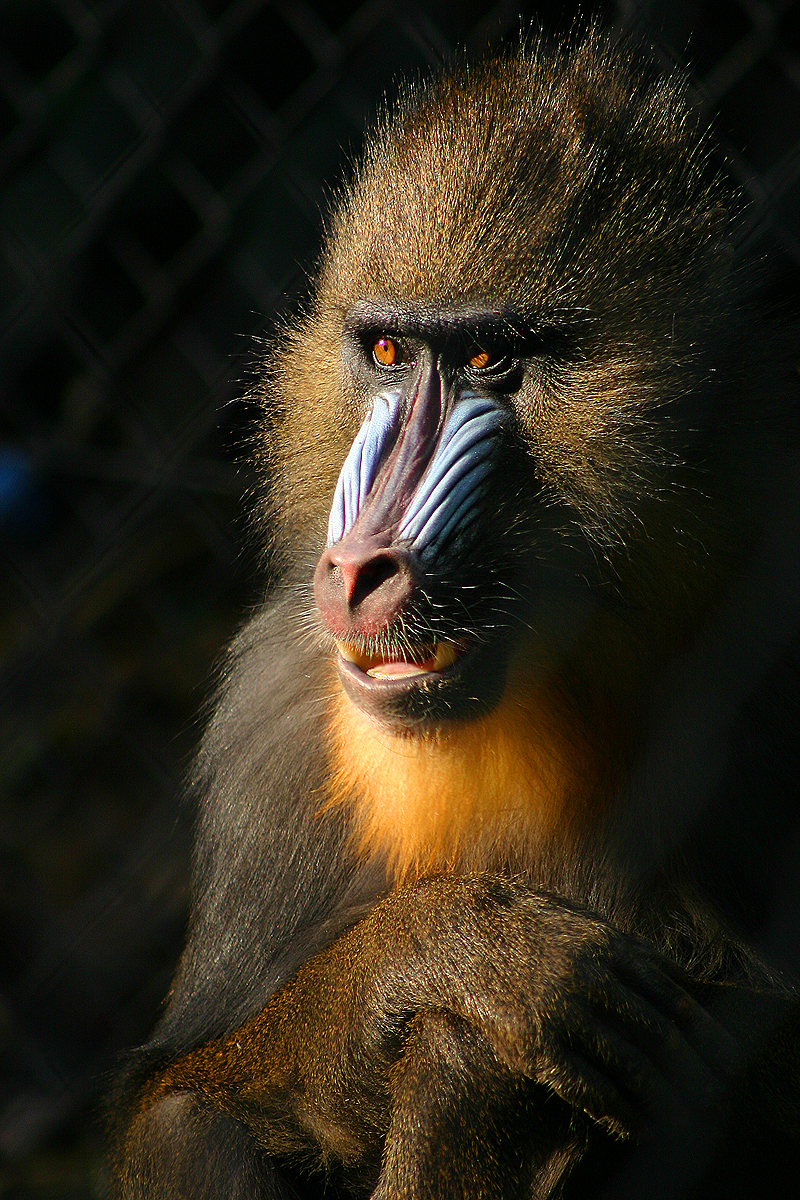
Mandrill, one of the many rare species encountered by Walker in Gabon

In 1854 Walker returned to England and married Margaret Clara Ann Molesworth (b.1833 Portsmouth d.1873 Wandsworth, London) daughter of Royal Marine Captain Arthur Molesworth at St.Marys Church, Stoke Newington, Middlesex. Walker soon returned to the Gabon charged with the task of establishing a new trading station or 'factory' on behalf of Hatton and Cookson at Libreville. Presumably Walker was back in England by the spring of 1857, as in December that year his wife Margaret gave birth to their first son Harry Bruce Walker (d.1922 Wandsworth, London) A second son followed in 1863 named Arthur Duncan Bruce Walker (d.1926 Australia). Walker also had another son, André Raponda Walker (b.1871 Gabon d.1968 Gabon), by Princess Agnorogoule Ikoutou d.1913 Gabon and a daughter by Ikoutou in 1873. Ikoutou was Mpongwe, and a niece of King Louis Dowé. Raponda Walker, an author, botanist, and ethnographer, was the first Gabonese Roman Catholic priest. It is also likely that Walker fathered a number children by native women.

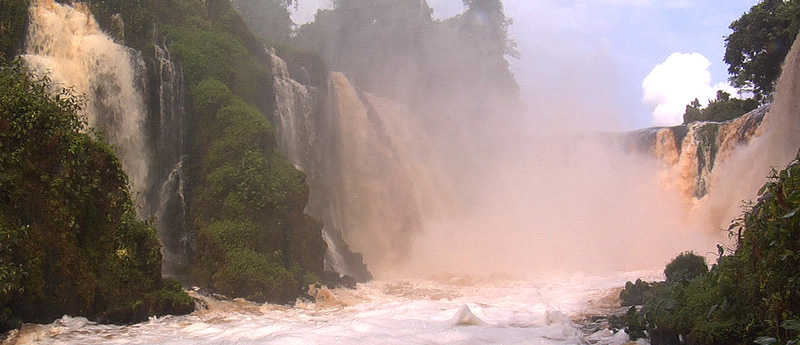
A section of the massive cataract that makes up Kongou Falls, where Walker hunted - Photo:Michael Dalton-Smith

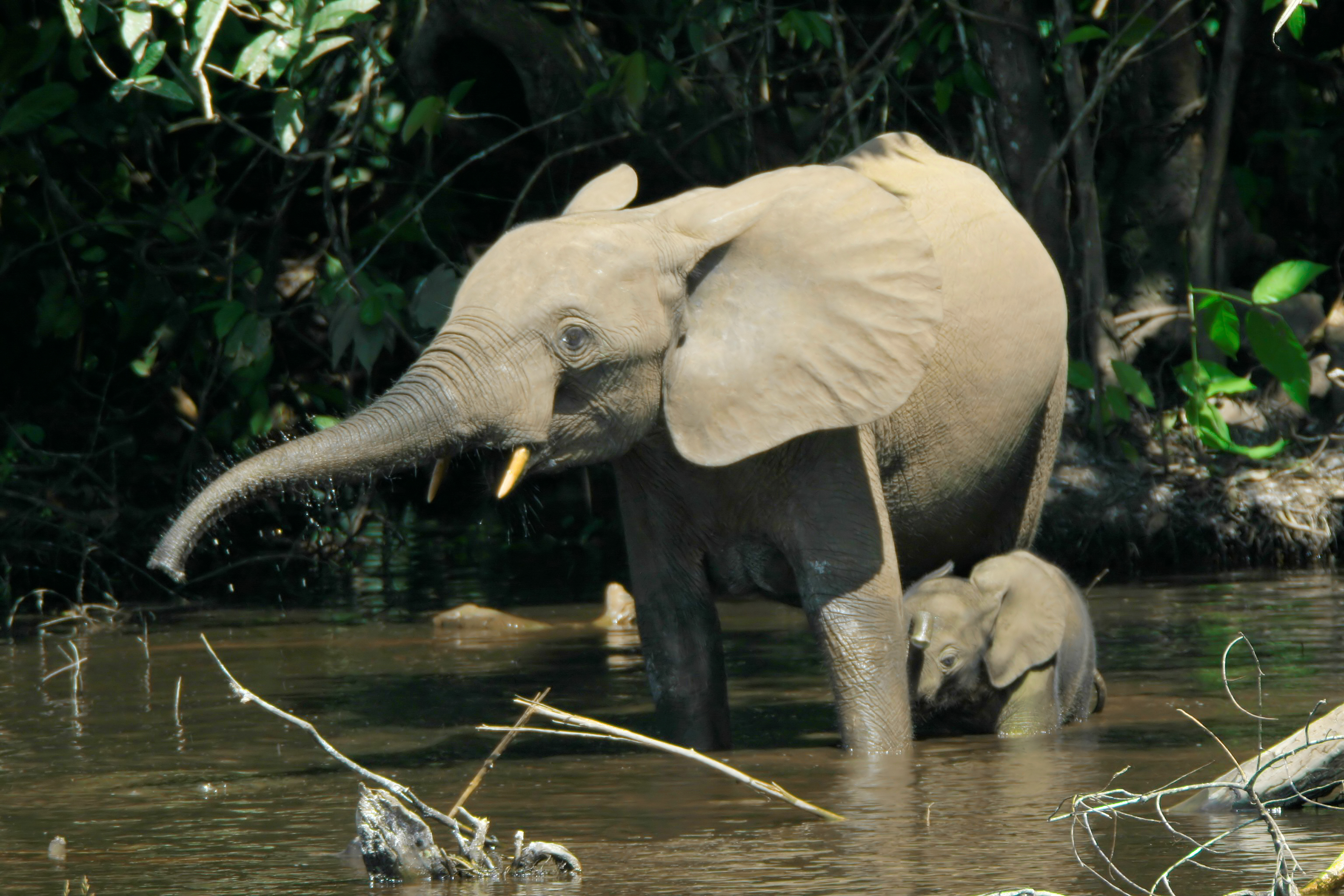
Forest elephants

A letter written by Walker from Africa in 1868 to his friend John Holt, referred to an unnamed "daughter" and it was said that Walker held sexual relations with more than one native woman. Robert Bruce Walker's first wife, Margaret Clara Ann Molesworth died in 1873 at Wandsworth London. In 1876 Walker married again to Minnie Annetta Bevir (b.1858 London d.1910 London). No issue came of this union but within a few years the marriage began to breakdown, due in part to Walker's long absences from home and Mrs. Walker's intemperance and incurring debt. In 1875 Walker brought his African son, Ignace Gervais Andre Raponda Walker to England where he remained for about a year during which he attended school at Southampton, visited London and met his paternal grandmother, Charlotte Walker. Andre returned to Africa in 1876 at the request of his mother Ikoutou. It is doubtful if he ever saw his father again. By this time Bruce Walker had become dissatisfied with his lot with Hatton and Cookson and set about finding new means of earning a living.

In the autumn of 1876 he set out for Marseilles via Paris with the intention of investing in an ice skating rink business but soon ran into financial difficulties. He returned to England before setting out for Sierra Leone, West Africa, working as a prospector for a gold mining enterprise. However, by the mid 1880s Walker was again in financial trouble; resorting to borrowing and begging money from friends and colleagues. In 1898 he met with Adolfo de España y Gómez de Humarán, former Spanish governor of Spanish Guinea and personal acquaintance with high ranking members of the Spanish military including José Toral y Velázquez and Arsenio Linares y Pombo. The governor and Walker bitterly disagreed about the question of Cuba. Walker was "outspokenly pro-American" with regards to the Spanish–American War, whereas Governor España believed Cuba rightfully belonged to Spain. During this time Walker also struck up a friendship with Arthur Henry Neumann. Robert Bruce Napoleon Walker died at 14 Osbourne Terrace, Clapham Road, London on 9 March 1901 suffering from circulatory problems and sepsis. He was buried at Brompton Cemetery, London on 13 March, sharing the same grave plot as his first wife Margaret and brother-in-law Thomas Hooper Molesworth.

== Taxon named in his honor ==
- Enteromius walkeri (Boulenger, 1904) is a species of ray-finned fish in the genus Enteromius from Ghana and the Ivory Coast.

== Bibliography ==
- Haggerty, Sheryllynne; Webster, Anthony; White, Nicholas J. (15 March 2009). The empire in one city?: Liverpool's inconvenient imperial past. Manchester University Press. ISBN 978-0-7190-7887-3.
- Reel, Monte (12 March 2013). Between Man and Beast: An Unlikely Explorer and the African Adventure the Victorian World by Storm. Knopf Doubleday Publishing Group. ISBN 978-0-385-53423-9.
- Webber, Sabra J. (5 November 2014). Folklore Unbound: A Concise Introduction. Waveland Press. ISBN 978-1-4786-2729-6.
- Flinders, Stephen Matthew; married to a great, great granddaughter of R.B.N.Walker and a regular speaker on the Life and Travels of Robert Bruce Napoleon Walker 2015.
