= André Raponda Walker =

Gabonese writer (1871–1968)

The Reverend André Raponda Walker
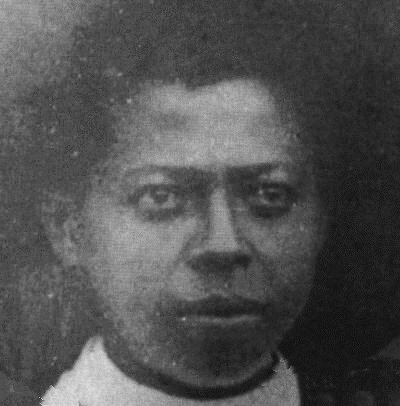
- in 1898.
- Born: 19 July 1871
- Died: 11 December 1968; Libreville
- Occupation: Priest
- Known for: Recording the culture of Gabon
- Parent(s): Princesse Agnorogoulè Ikoutou and Robert Bruce N. Walker

André Raponda Walker (19 July 1871–11 December 1968) was a Gabonese author, ethnographer, Catholic priest, and missionary. Walker wrote extensively about Gabonese language and culture.

== Biography ==
Raponda-Walker was born to a Mpongwe mother, Princesse Agnorogoulè Ikoutou, niece of King Anguilè Louis Dowé, and Robert Bruce Napoleon Walker, a British merchant in Gabon, and member of the Anthropological Society.

The young boy spent a year in England around his fourth birthday but returned to Gabon in 1876 and started at the school of Sainte-Marie in 1877.

He was ordained on 23 July 1899 and his first assignment was at Notre-Dame-des-Trois-Épis in Ngounié in southern Gabon.

He was the first person from Gabon to be ordained as a Catholic priest. He served at several locations in Gabon where he learnt a number of local languages and created dictionaries and lexicographies. These works are still used today.

From about 1930, Monsignor Walker was one of the few missionaries still studying and documenting Gabonese anthropology, as many foreign researchers had returned to their countries of origin. Walker used interviews to gather the oral traditions of his country using his knowledge of about twelve Gabonese languages. He gathered histories of the Gabonese estuary, the N'Gounie River valley and coastal areas.

Raponda-Walker retired in 1947 at Libreville. He had been stationed at a number of locations in Gabon and Equatorial Guinea, including Sindara, Libreville, Boutika (Guinée Equatoriale), Donguila, Lambaréné, Saint-Martin (near Mouila) et au Fernan Vaz.

Andre lived to see his country independent. Most of Raponda-Walker's work was published in the last few years of his life, after editing by Marcel Soret, a French ethnologist. The work contributed to a systematic project to record Gabonese culture led by Hubert Deschamps.

== Legacy ==
Walker is well regarded in his country. His image appeared on one of the nation's postage stamps in 1981 and the Collège et Lycée Raponda Walker was named in his honour.

== Works ==
- Dictionnaire mpongwè-français, suivi d'éléments de grammaire, Metz, 1934.
- Essai de grammaire tsogo, Brazzaville, 1937.
- Notes d'Histoire du Gabon, 1960.
- Dictionnaire français-mpongwè, 1961.
- Les Plantes utiles du Gabon (with Roger Sillans), Paris, Le Chevalier, 1961, 614 p. (Coll. Encyclopédie biologique, 56).
- Rites et croyances des peuples du Gabon (with Roger Sillans), 1962.
- Contes gabonais, 1967.

== Bibliography ==
- Jeremy Rich, "Maurice Briault, André Raponda Walker and the Value of Missionary Anthropology in Colonial Gabon", Social Sciences and Missions (Leiden Brill), N°19/December 2006, pp. 65–89
- Jeremy Rich, “André Raponda Walker,” Dictionary of African Biography. Edited by Henry Louis Gates, Jr. & Emmanuel Akyeampong. New York and Oxford: Oxford University Press, forthcoming
