= Punu people =

Bantu group in Gabon and Congo-Brazzaville

Gabon in red with the Republic of Congo bordering to the south and east

The Punu or Bapunu (Pungwe|Pungu|Uréwé) (Sira, Ban Sira), are a Bantu meta-ethnicity of Gabon and the Republic of Congo.

== History ==
According to Magang-Ma-Mbuju and Mbumb Bwass the Punu people originated from the people called «Jagas» and came from Kasaï and Zambezi. According to them, it was the Punu people who had invaded the kingdom of Kongo in 1568 and they were known as Jagas.

Claude Hélène Perrot said that before the publication of the work of these two authors (Magang-Ma-Mbuju and Mbumb Bwass), many studies devoted to the Jagas had shown that this warrior group was of diverse origins, B.M. Batsikama and M. Ipari had concluded that the invaders of Mbanza Kongo in 1568 were populations of Kongo origin. The Punu people migrated into The Republic of the Congo in the 16th century and migrated into Southern Gabon in the 18th century.

== Culture ==
=== White masks ===
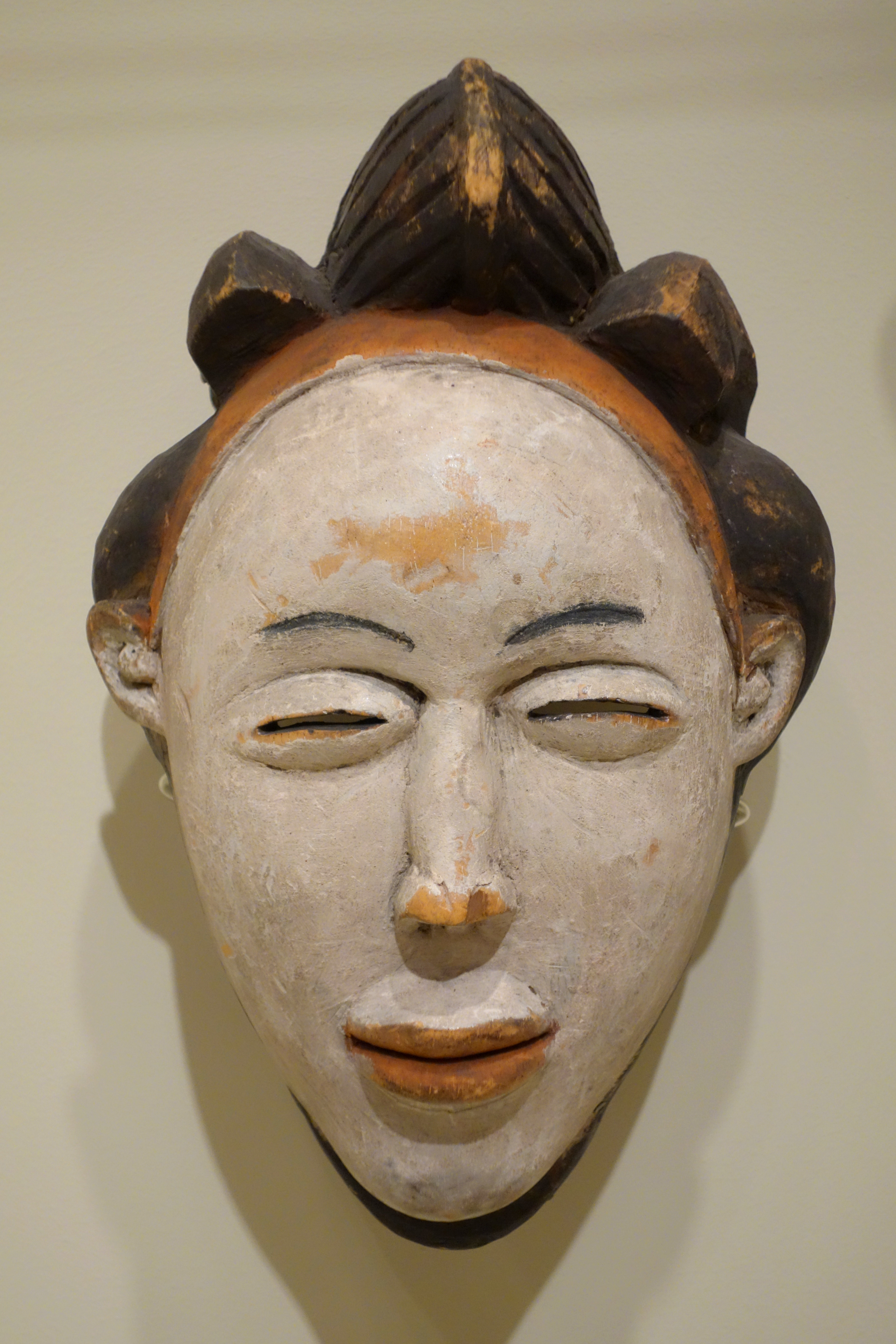
White mask

One of the well known Punu art objects are the white masks with nine dots on the forehead symbolizing the nine Punu clans, now known as the Punu masks. The masks are life size, they can cover a person's face. They are worn by the dancers in south Gabon. When there is a major community event the dancers wear these masks, one major event would be a dance performed for a secret society. Europeans have been trying to discover the Punu society for a long time, but not until June 1865 did the first European discover the first white mask. Later in 1925-30 Europeans had more access to the societies and the secrecy was less than before.

=== Black masks ===
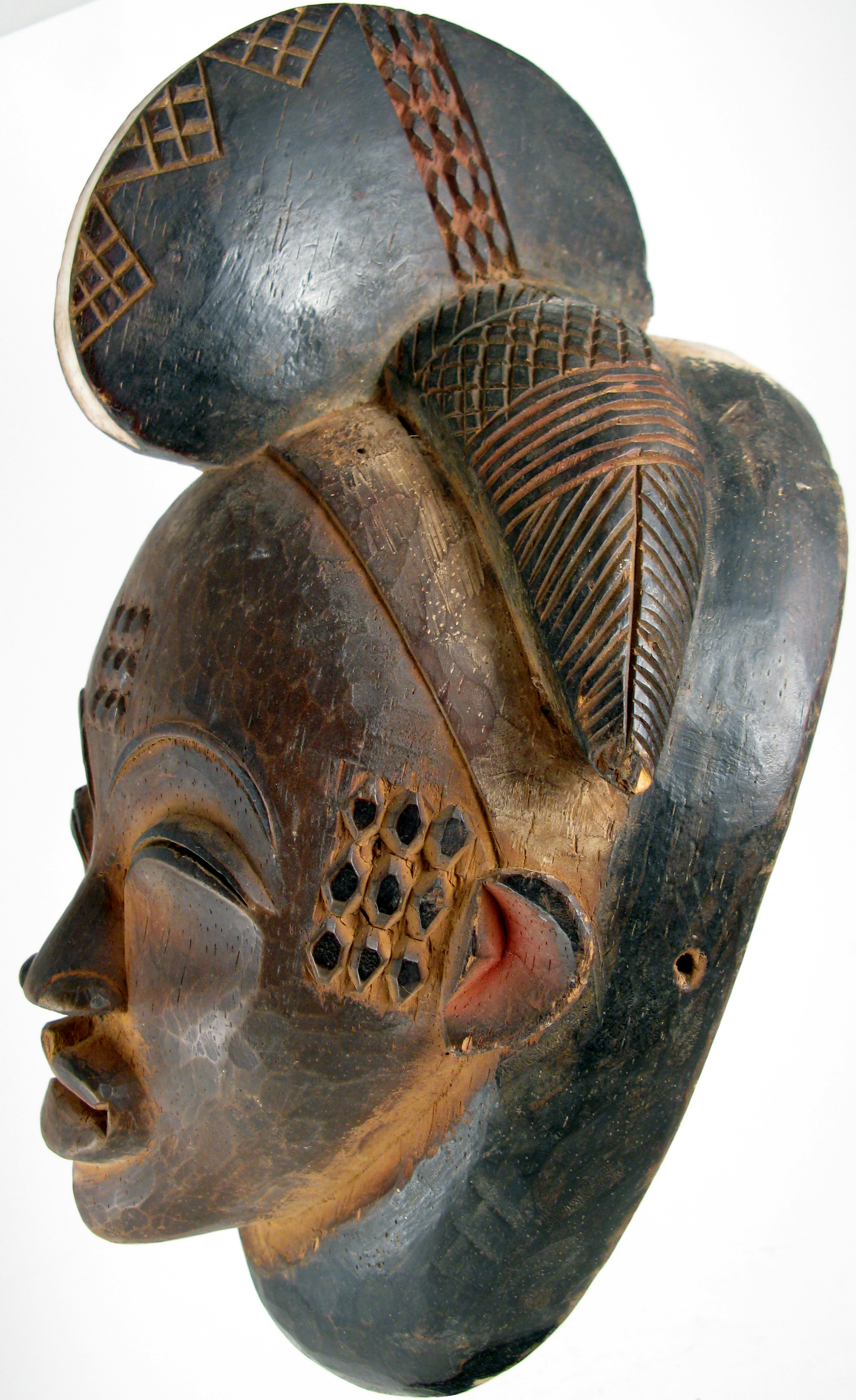
Black mask

Black masks in Punu culture were worn by dancers as training masks, which perform first to announce the arrival of the white mask dancer which is more experienced. Sometimes when a misfortune happens to a group they take white masks and paint them black. This type of mask is only danced with in the dark at night. Different from the other two masks, these masks are rarely found in a museum because they used to hide them very well, due to the belief that they are dangerous and they have an evil nature.

== Beliefs ==
The Punu believe in their God Nyambye, they feared evil spirits, they used to do chirurgical operations after someone's death to find out the cause of the death however if the cause of the late person could not be found it was then the wizard (mulosi) from the family circle who should be held responsible. People were jealous of successful people and they believed that their jealousy would cause the successful person harm or death. Illness was always seen as work of an evil spirit and the only way to heal was by a special ritual to cast away the evil spirit's work.

== Diaspora ==
Newspaper adverts, seeking the capture and return of enslaved runaways, known as 'Freedom Seekers', have uncovered a young, female member of the Punu community living and working in East London in the early 1700s. Her intricate scarification marks, described as diamonds on her forehead and temples are those portrayed on the Mukudj, female ancestor masks of the Punu community in Gabon.

Punu carvers continue to model these masks on the women they consider beautiful in the village.

The girl, aged about 16, resided with Captain Henry Lumley and his household at number 18 Prescott street, Goodman Fields, Aldgate. On the night of Thursday 14 January 1706, taking advantage of the Captain's absence, she escaped her captivity, and was still free when the advert was printed three days later.
