= Douya-Onoy (department) =

Coordinates: 1°51′S 11°03′E

- Department
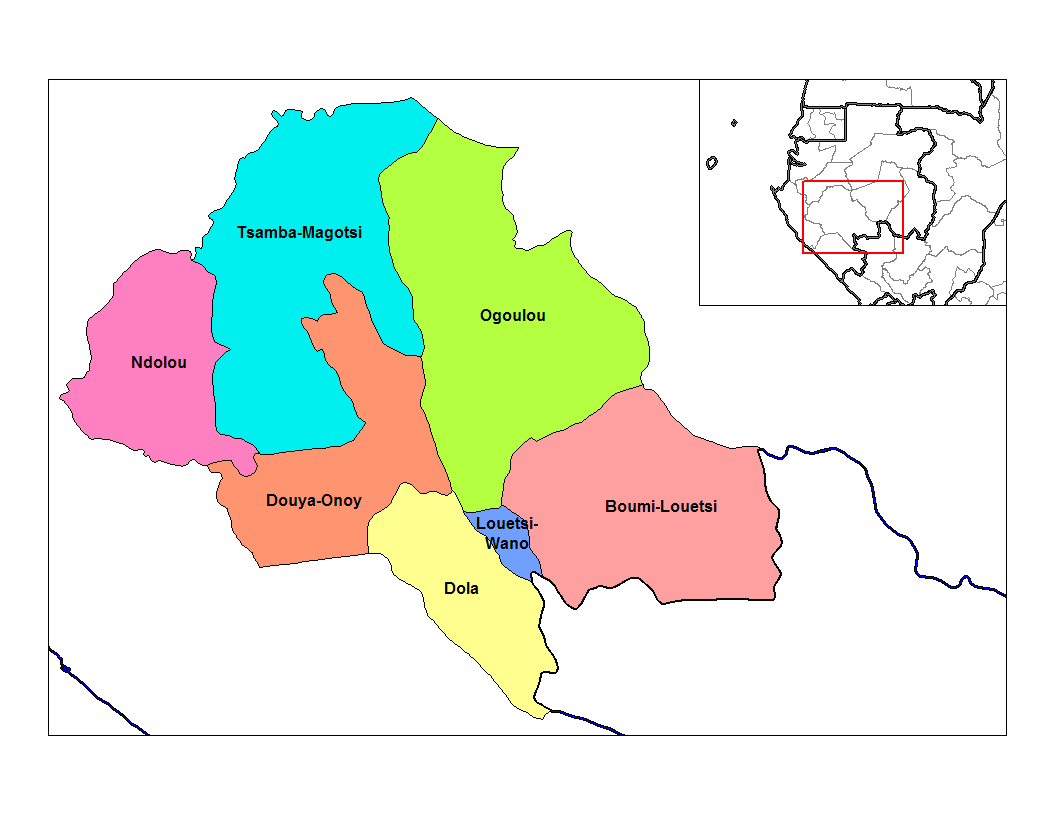
- Douya-Onoy Department in the region
- Country: Gabon
- Province: Ngounié Province

Population (2013 Census)
  - Total: 37,699
- Time zone: UTC+1 (GMT +1)

Douya-Onoy is a department of Ngounié Province in south-western Gabon. The capital lies at Mouila. It had a population of 37,699 in 2013.
