= Sindara =

Town in Gabon

- Location in Gabon
- Coordinates: 1°2′S 10°40′E
- Country: Gabon
- Province: Ngounie Province
- Department: Tsamba-Magotsi Department
- Time zone: UTC+1 (WAT)

Sindara is a town in Gabon.

== Notable residents ==
- André Raponda Walker, the anthropologist and priest worked here.
- Bruno Ben Moubamba, a Gabonese politician.
