= Collège et Lycée Raponda Walker =

Location
- Port-Gentil; Gabon; 0.7234°S 8.7853°E

Information
- Type: Private primary and secondary school
- Religious affiliation: Catholicism
- Patron saint: André Raponda Walker
- Established: 1930 (96 years ago)
- Founder: Father René Lefèbre
- Grades: KG1 – 12
- Gender: Boys (1930 to mid-1960s); Co-educational (since mid-1960s)
- Enrollment: 1,005
- Website: rapondawalker.free.fr

Collège et Lycée Raponda Walker is a private Catholic primary and secondary school, located in Port-Gentil, the second largest city in Gabon. The school was established in 1930 and has arroximately 1,000 pupils. Since 1975 it has been named for André Raponda Walker, a writer and the first Catholic priest in Gabon.

== History ==
The school was started in 1930 in the grounds of the new church of St. Louis by Father René Lefèbre. (The church had only been built in 1927.) The school was named then after the church.

In 1949, the school was taken over by the Brothers of St. Gabriel, but it was not until 1965 that a section for girls was introduced. In 1969, the school started mixed classes.

In 1975, the school took on its existing name which is in honour of the first Gabonese person to be ordained as a catholic priest.

== Notable alumni ==
- Stéphane Lasme, a professional basketball player, later attended Leon MBA in Libreville

== See also ==
- Education in Gabon
- Roman Catholicism in Gabon
