= Mahouna =

- Location in Gabon
- Coordinates: 0°52′S 12°40′E
- Country: Gabon
- Province: Ogooué-Lolo Province
- Department: Mouloundou Department
- Elevation: 690 ft (210 m)

Mahouna is a village in south-eastern Gabon. It is located in the Mouloundou Department in Ogooué-Lolo Province and is situated on the Ogooué River.

Nearby towns and villages include Mikouya (1.4 nm), Kera-Kera (1.0 nm), Mbonha (1.0 nm), Lingoye (2.2 nm), Tsingue (3.0 nm), Mikouma (4.5 nm) and Malembe (2.2 nm).
