= Boumi-Louetsi (department) =

Coordinates: 1°53′S 11°56′E

- Department
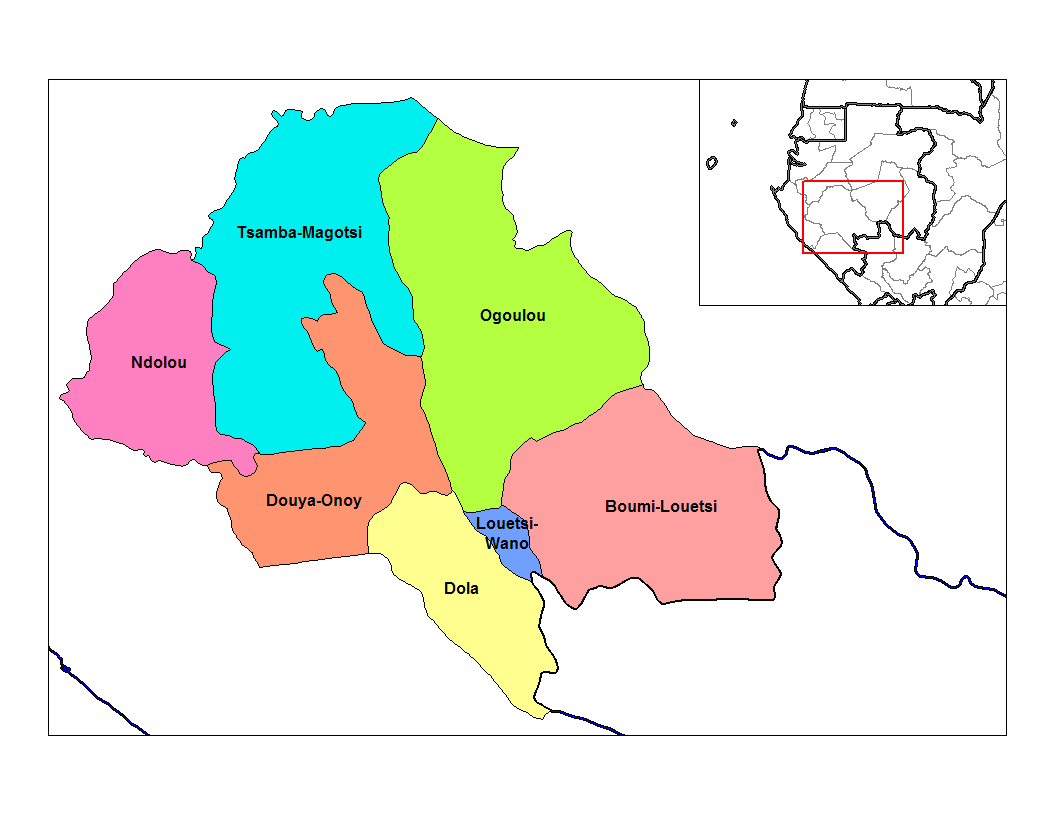
- Boumi-Louetsi Department in the region
- Country: Gabon
- Province: Ngounié Province

Population (2013 Census)
  - Total: 13,223
- Time zone: UTC+1 (GMT +1)

Boumi-Louetsi is a department of Ngounié Province in southern Gabon. The capital lies at Mbigou. It had a population of 13,223 in 2013.

== Towns and villages ==
- Mbigou
- Lingoye
