= Mouila =

City in Ngounié Province, Gabon

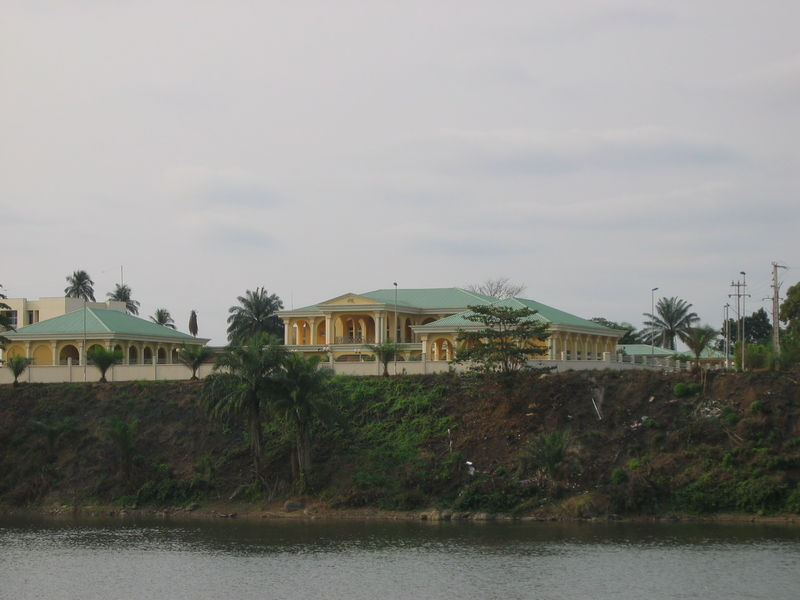
- Presidential residence in Mouila

- Coat of arms

- Location in Gabon
- Coordinates: 1°51′50″S 11°3′27″E
- Country: Gabon
- Province: Ngounié Province
- Department: Douya-Onoy Department

Population
  - Total: 36,000

Mouila is the capital of Ngounié Province in Gabon. It lies on the Ngounié River and the N1 road and has a population of about 20,000 people. Its main sight is Lac Bleu, a lake known for its bright blue water.

Mouila is very spread out and has several markets and commercial centers. The city is home to a large number of ethnic groups and is a major hub of commerce and travel. It is served by Mouila Airport.

== Climate ==
Mouila has a tropical savanna climate (Köppen climate classification Aw).

Climate data for Mouila
Month	Jan	Feb	Mar	Apr	May	Jun	Jul	Aug	Sep	Oct	Nov	Dec	Year
Mean daily maximum °C (°F)	31.3 (88.3)	32.0 (89.6)	32.1 (89.8)	32.2 (90.0)	31.0 (87.8)	28.3 (82.9)	27.3 (81.1)	27.6 (81.7)	29.4 (84.9)	30.8 (87.4)	30.9 (87.6)	30.7 (87.3)	30.3 (86.5)
Daily mean °C (°F)	28.8 (83.8)	27.3 (81.1)	27.3 (81.1)	27.5 (81.5)	26.9 (80.4)	24.8 (76.6)	23.7 (74.7)	24.1 (75.4)	25.6 (78.1)	26.7 (80.1)	26.7 (80.1)	26.6 (79.9)	26.3 (79.3)
Mean daily minimum °C (°F)	26.2 (79.2)	22.5 (72.5)	22.5 (72.5)	22.7 (72.9)	22.8 (73.0)	21.3 (70.3)	20.0 (68.0)	20.6 (69.1)	21.8 (71.2)	22.5 (72.5)	22.4 (72.3)	22.5 (72.5)	22.3 (72.1)
Average precipitation mm (inches)	223.4 (8.80)	226.4 (8.91)	249.3 (9.81)	239.9 (9.44)	165.7 (6.52)	20.4 (0.80)	5.4 (0.21)	7.9 (0.31)	51.3 (2.02)	342.3 (13.48)	397.1 (15.63)	231.3 (9.11)	2,160.4 (85.06)
Average precipitation days	15.5	13.3	16.2	15.2	13.2	2.9	3.5	4.4	8.8	20.5	21.4	15.6	150.5
Average relative humidity (%)	82	80	80	82	82	83	82	81	79	80	81	82	81
Source: NOAA

== Notable people ==
- François Bozizé a former president of the Central African Republic
- Joseph Owondault Berre, vice president of Gabon
- Pierre Mamboundou, a politician
- André Raponda Walker, an anthropologist and priest who worked near here, at a place called Sainte-Martin.
