= Mimongo =

Town in Gabon

- Location in Gabon
- Coordinates: 1°37′12″S 11°36′36″E
- Country: Gabon
- Province: Ngounie
- Department: Ngounie
- Time zone: UTC+1 (WAT)

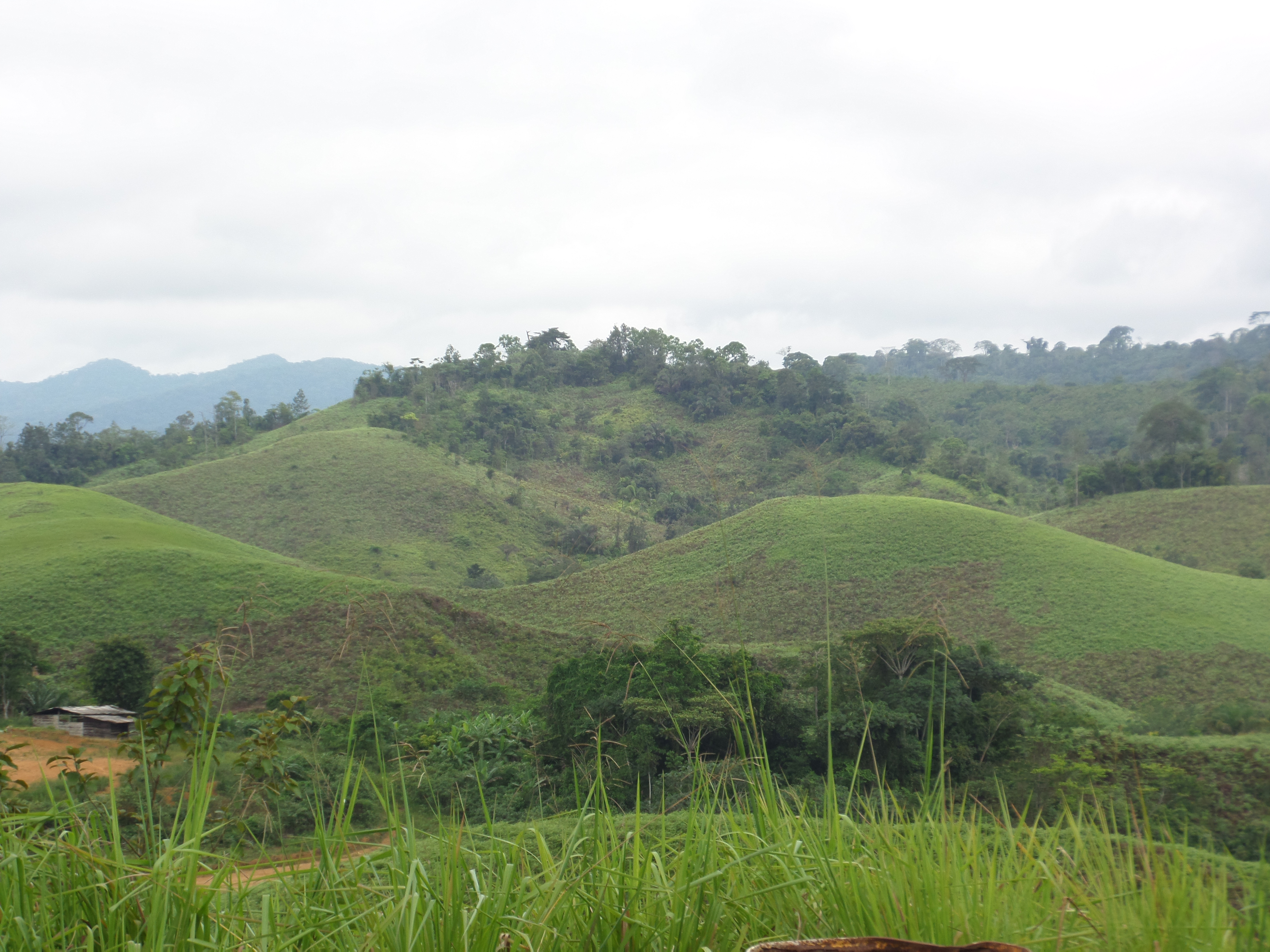
Landscape in Mimongo

Mimongo is a place in the region of Province de la Ngounie in Gabon at 1°37'12" south of the equator and 11°36'36" east of the Greenwich Prime Meridian.

Mimongo has a population of approximately 3,307 people.

Facts on Mimongo:

Name: Mimongo

Status: Place

Region: Province de la Ngounie

Country: Gabon

Continent: Africa

Population: 3,307

Latitude/Breadth: 1°37'12"S (-1.6195200°)

Longitude/Length: 11°36'36"E (11.6067500°)

Time zone: Africa/Libreville (UTC +1.0)

Current time: 12:10pm (Wednesday, 7 Dec 2011)

Distance as the crow flies between Mimongo and Gabon's capital Libreville is approximately 327 km (203 mi.).
