= Punu-Lumbo mask =

Tribal mask native to Gabon

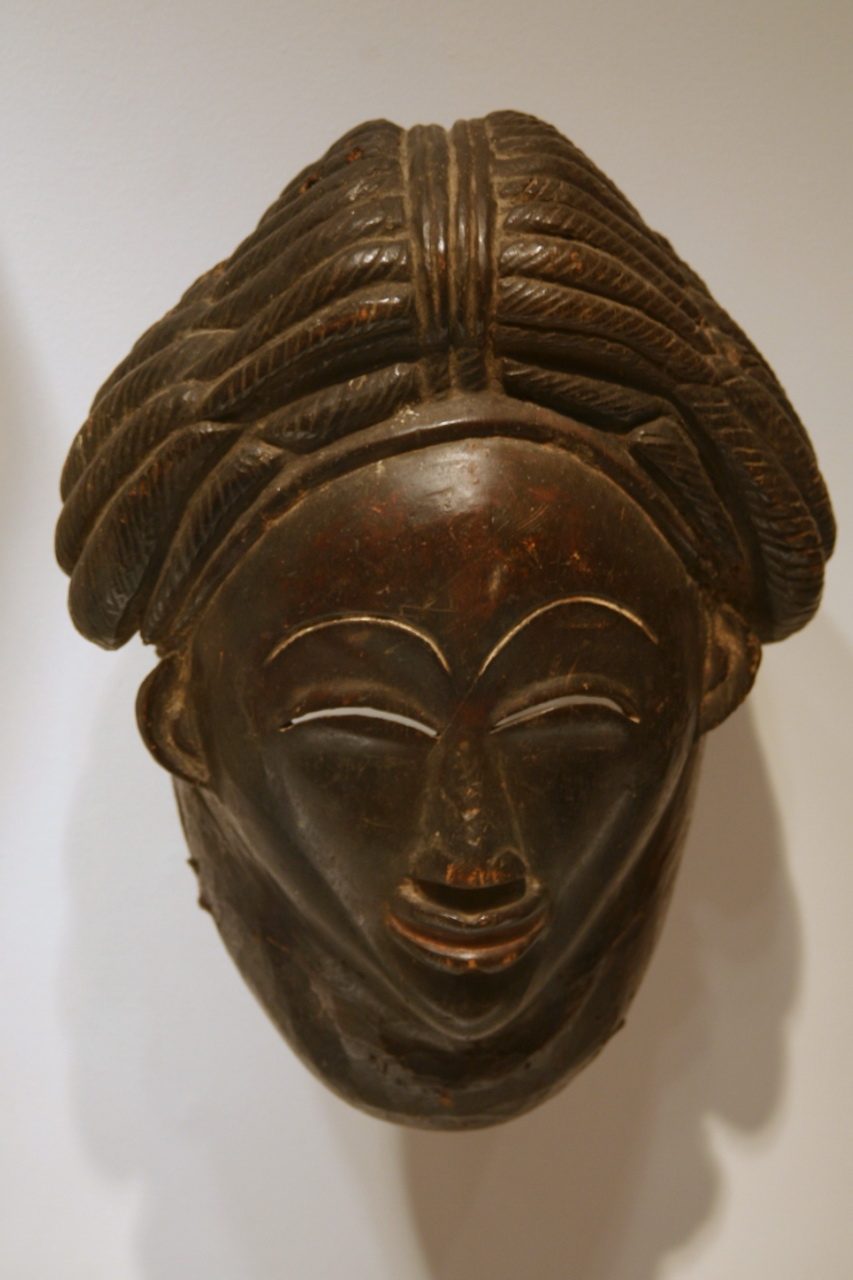
A Punu-Lumbo mask

A Punu-Lumbo mask is a tribal mask native to the Ogooué River basin in Gabon, especially in the south in Ngounié Province. The masks are extremely valuable to collectors of African art, and have been sold at Sotheby's for well over $400,000. The earliest known example, collected in 1867, is part of the Pitt Rivers Museum collection at the University of Oxford. Several other museums, such as the National Museum of African Art in Washington, D.C. are in possession of one. They have been featured in the African Negro Art show at the Museum of Modern Art in New York City (1935), and at the Museum voor Volkenkunde, in Rotterdam (1953). The masks were popular among European collectors during the 1920s and 1930s.

== Design ==
Compared stylistically to Japanese art, the masks are typically oval in shape, with narrowed eyes, arched eyebrows and small ears. The male masks (ikwar) tend to be brown and black pigment over kaolin and viewed as ugly and are shown at night whilst the masks for females (mukudj) tend to be lighter and considered prettier by the locals and are shown in the day. The Okuyi (or mokuyi) white-faced masks commonly contain nine scale-like patterns on the forehead. This is said to be a "central eye" and also a flowering tree. The white color, usually derived from kaolin, represents clarity, light, and beauty.

== Use ==
Male dancers are known to wear the Okuyi while dancing. The white-faced masks are also used by other Gabon and Zaire rainforest people, such as the Kotas and Mpongwe, The Ashira also share in the white-faced mask tradition, which includes soft facial characteristics. The masks have been linked to the Mukui society and to female ancestor celebration dances, a funerary spirit association. A variation of the Punu-Lumbo mask is produced by the Tsangui in the northern Democratic Republic of the Congo.
