= Tsamba-Magotsi (department) =

- Department
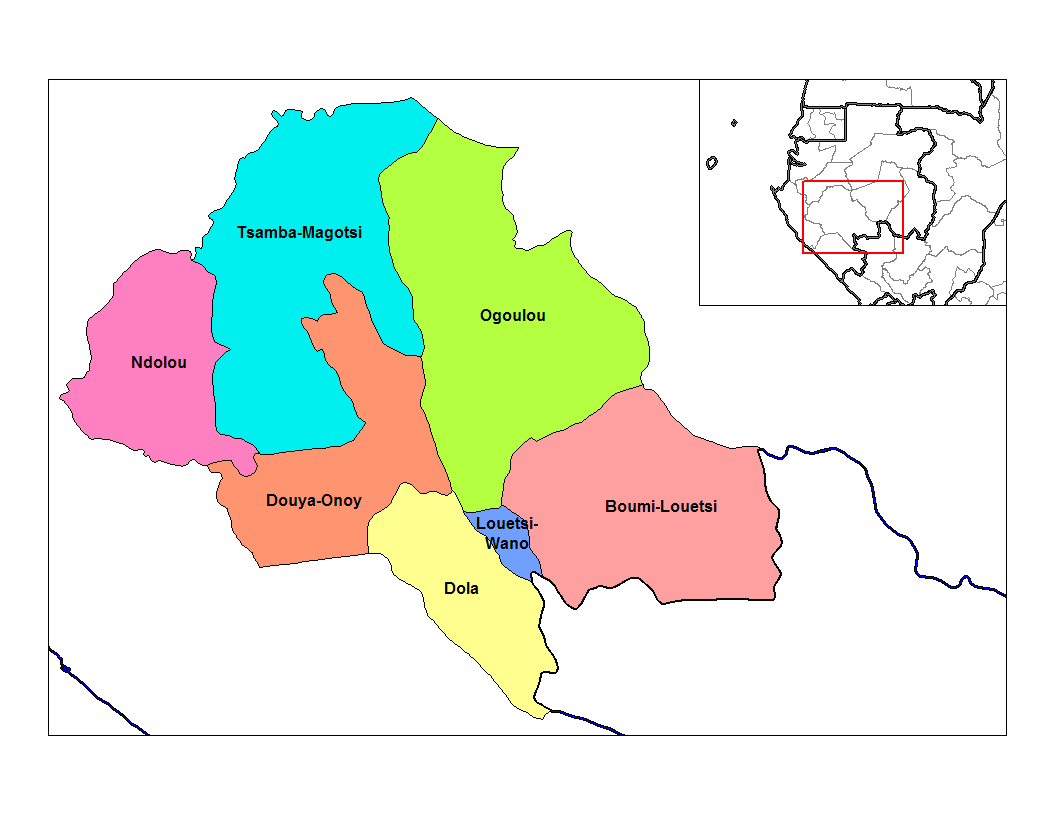
- Tsamba-Magotsi Department in the region
- Coordinates: 1°13′S 10°36′E
- Country: Gabon
- Province: Ngounié Province

Population (2013 Census)
  - Total: 14,875
- Time zone: UTC+1 (GMT +1)

Tsamba-Magotsi is a department of Ngounié Province in southern Gabon. The capital lies at Fougamou. It had a population of 14,875 in 2013.

== Towns and villages ==
- Guidouma
