= Mouloundou (department) =

Coordinates: 0°49′S 12°42′E

- Department
- Mouloundou Department in the region
- Country: Gabon
- Province: Ogooué-Lolo Province

Population (2013 Census)
  - Total: 27,750
- Time zone: UTC+1 (GMT +1)

Mouloundou is a department of Ogooué-Lolo Province in eastern Gabon. The capital lies at Lastoursville. It had a population of 27,750 in 2013.

== Towns and villages ==
- Lastoursville
- Mbonha
- Mahouna
- Mikouya
