= Ngounié Province =

Province of Gabon

Ngounié
- Province
- Flag Coat of arms

- Ngounié Province in Gabon
- Coordinates: 1°36′S 11°0′E
- Country: Gabon
- Capital: Mouila

Area
  - Total: 37,750 km^{2} (14,580 sq mi)

Population (2013 census)
  - Total: 100,838
  - Density: 2.671/km^{2} (6.918/sq mi)
- HDI (2017): 0.617 medium

Ngounié is a province of south-central Gabon covering an area of 3,775 kilometres (2,346 mi). Its capital is Mouila. At the 2013 census it had 100,838 inhabitants. In 2016, its governor was Benjamin Nzigou.

== History ==
The province is named after the Ngounié River, which crosses it with its many tributaries.

In December 1858 the French explorer Paul Du Chaillu navigated the Nguoiné river upstream to Fougamou. On his journey, he met several local tribes whom he described in his diaries of his second voyage. Later, Catholic missions were built in Mandji, Sindara, and Saint Martin, whose architecture attracts many tourists.

== Geography ==
The geography varies from large expanses of savannah and forest to the Monts de Cristal in the north to the Chaillu and Ikoundou ranges further south. Steep sloping mountains abut plains and dense forests, savannah, lakes, and rich farmland.

== Population ==
Estimated at 101,415 inhabitants, the population of the Ngounié includes significant ethnic diversity including Eshira, Pinji, Punu, Tsogo, Njebi, Massango, Vungu and Eviya, who immigrated to Gabon in successive waves, and have lived together peacefully for many centuries.

All of these ethnic groups are Bantu.

=== Ethnic distribution ===
Ethnic group and number of inhabitants

- Punu-Eshira: 35260
- Njebi-Dyma: 22260
- Okandé-Tsogho: 11815
- Kota-Kélé: 2435

Traditional social and religious organizations are still very present in the daily life of the province, especially Bwiti and Ndjembé (female secret society).

== Legends and myths ==
Popular legends say that the province of Ngounié is protected by several genies. Thus the sirens Ipeti and Mougoumi, female genies living in Dola and Ngounié respectively, would according to legend be the protectors of Ndendé and Mouila. Tsamba, a male genie, and Magotsi, a female genie, would be the protectors of Fougamou, which they watch over from the top of the Empress Eugenie Falls. These genies are the symbolic protectors of the departments of the province. They inspire fear and respect in the inhabitants, who honor them by throwing coins and pouring liquor into the rivers they cross.

To the southeast, Ngounié borders the Niari Region of the Republic of the Congo. Domestically, it borders the following provinces:

- Nyanga – south
- Ogooué-Maritime – west
- Moyen-Ogooué – north
- Ogooué-Ivindo – northeast, at a quadripoint
- Ogooué-Lolo – east

== Departments ==
Ngounié is divided into 9 departments:

- Boumi-Louetsi Department (Mbigou)
- Dola Department (Ndendé)
- Douya-Onoy Department (Mouila)
- Louetsi-Wano Department (Lébamba)
- Ndolou Department (Mandji)
- Ogoulou Department (Mimongo)
- Tsamba-Magotsi Department (Fougamou)
- Louetsi-Bibaka Department (Malinga)
- Mougalaba Department (Guietsou)
