= List of airports in Gabon =

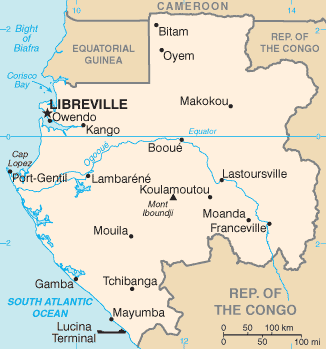
Map of Gabon

This is a list of airports in Gabon, sorted by location.

== List ==
Airport names indicated in bold indicate that the facility has commercial service on scheduled airlines.

Location	ICAO	IATA	Airport name
Akieni	FOGA	AKE	Akieni Airport
Bakoumba			Bidoungui Airport
Bitam	FOOB	BMM	Bitam Airport
Booué	FOGB	BGB	Booué Airport
Cocobeach	FOOC		Cocobeach Airport – closed
Fougamou	FOGF	FOU	Fougamou Airport
Franceville	FOON	MVB	**M'Vengue El Hadj Omar Bongo Ondimba International Airport**
Gamba	FOGX	GAX	Gamba Airport
Iguéla	FOOI	IGE	Tchongorove Airport
Koulamoutou	FOGK	KOU	**Koulamoutou Airport**
Lambaréné	FOGR	LBQ	Lambaréné Airport
Lastourville	FOOR	LTL	Lastourville Airport
Libreville	FOOL	LBV	**Leon M'Ba International Airport**
Makokou	FOOK	MKU	**Makokou Airport**
Mayumba	FOOY	MYB	Mayumba Airport
Mbigou	FOGG	MBC	Mbigou Airport
Médouneu		MDV	Médouneu Airport
Mékambo	FOOE	MKB	Mékambo Airport
Minvoul	FOGV	MVX	Minvoul Airport
Mitzic	FOOM	MZC	Mitzic Airport
Moabi	FOGI	MGX	Moabi Airport
Moanda	FOOD	MFF	Moanda Airport
Mouila	FOGM	MJL	**Mouila Airport**
Mounana			Léboka Airport
Ndendé	FOGE	KDN	Ndendé Airport
Ndjolé	FOGJ	KDJ	Ndjolé Ville Airport
Okondja	FOGQ	OKN	Okondja Airport
Omboué	FOOH	OMB	Omboué Hospital Airport
Oyem	FOGO	OYE	**Oyem Airport**
Petit Bambam			Petit Bambam Airport
Port-Gentil	FOOG	POG	**Port-Gentil International Airport**
Setté Cama	FOOS	ZKM	Setté Cama Airport
Tchibanga	FOOT	TCH	**Tchibanga Airport**

== See also ==
- Transport in Gabon
- List of airports by ICAO code: F#FO – Gabon
- Wikipedia: WikiProject Aviation/Airline destination lists: Africa#Gabon
