= Mayumba =

Mayumba may refer to several places in Gabon:

- Mayumba Airport
- Mayumba, Gabon
- Mayumba National Park
