= Mougambi =

Island village in Gabon

Coordinates: 2°08′S 11°30′E

Mougambi is a small village on an island located on the Ndogo Lagoon in Gabon, between the town of Gamba and the village Setté Cama. The closest village to Mougambi is Pitonga.
