= LBQ =

LBQ may refer to:

- IATA code for Lambaréné Airport
- LBQ, a variation of LGB in She's in London
- lbq, ISO code for the Wampar language
- LBQ Ltd, a stakeholder in the development of The Shard
