= N6 road (Gabon) =

Road in Gabon

Location
- Country: Gabon

Highway system
- Transport in Gabon

The N6 road is one of the national highways of Gabon. It connects the far south-west of the country at Mayumba to the centre at Lastoursville. The N6 connects to the N1 in Ndendé.

Towns located along the highway include:

- Mayumba
- Tchibanga
- Ndendé
- Lébamba
- Koulamoutou
- Lastoursville
