= Booué Airport =

Airport in Gabon

Booué Airport Aéroport de Booué
- IATA: BGB; ICAO: FOGB

Summary
- Serves: Booué
- Elevation AMSL: 604 ft / 184 m
- Coordinates: 0°06′25″S 11°56′35″E

Map
- Location in Gabon

Runways
Direction	Length		Surface
Direction	m	ft	Surface
12/30	1,000	3,281	Laterite
- Sources: GCM Google Maps

Booué Airport (French: Aéroport de Booué) (IATA: BGB, ICAO: FOGB) is an airport serving the town of Booué in the Ogooué-Ivindo Province of Gabon. The runway lies within a bend of the Ogooué River.

== See also ==
- List of airports in Gabon
- Transport in Gabon
