= Ntem =

Ntem may refer to:

- Ntem (department), Gabon
- Campo River, also called the Ntem, between Cameroon, Gabon and Equatorial Guinea
- Yamba language, also called the Ntem, in Cameroon

== See also ==
- Woleu-Ntem Province, Gabon
