= Setté Cama Airport =

Sette Cama Airport Aéroport de Setté Cama
- IATA: ZKM; ICAO: FOOS

Summary
- Airport type: Public
- Serves: Sette Cama
- Elevation AMSL: 10 ft / 3 m
- Coordinates: 2°32′20″S 9°45′55″E

Map
- Location in Gabon

Runways
Direction	Length		Surface
Direction	m	ft	Surface
15/33	1,200	3,937	Sand
- Sources: GCM Google Maps T. Gabon

Sette Cama Airport (French: Aéroport de Setté Cama) (IATA: ZKM, ICAO: FOOS) is an airstrip serving Sette Cama, in Ogooué-Maritime Province, Gabon. The runway is on a peninsula on the ocean side of the Ndogo Lagoon, 2 kilometres (1.2 mi) southeast of the village.

== See also ==
- List of airports in Gabon
- Transport in Gabon
