= Sahoué =

Coordinates: 00°37′N 09°20′E

Sahoué is a port in Gabon. It is served by the Trans-Gabon Railway. It is located northwest of the capital at the extreme end of the Santa Clara peninsula.

== See also ==
- Transport in Gabon
