= Kougouleu =

- Location in Gabon
- Coordinates: 0°22′N 9°55′E
- Country: Gabon
- Province: Estuaire Province
- Department: Komo Department

Kougouleu is a small town in Komo Department, Estuaire Province, in northwestern Gabon. It is an eastern suburb of Libreville and lies northwest of Kango on the N1 road. The N1 and N5 road meet in Kongouleu.

The main university is Université Polytechnique de Kougouleu.
