= Ndendé Airport =

Airport in Gabon

Ndendé Airport Aéroport de Ndendé
- IATA: KDN; ICAO: FOGE

Summary
- Airport type: Public
- Serves: Ndendé
- Elevation AMSL: 417 ft / 127 m
- Coordinates: 2°24′20″S 11°21′40″E

Map
- Location in Gabon

Runways
Direction	Length		Surface
Direction	m	ft	Surface
11/29	800	2,625	Grass
- Sources: GCM HERE Maps

Ndendé Airport (French: Aéroport de Ndendé) (IATA: KDN, ICAO: FOGE) is an airport serving Ndendé, Ngounié Province, Gabon.

== See also ==
- List of airports in Gabon
- Transport in Gabon
