= Zoulameyong =

- Location in Gabon
- Coordinates: 0°14′N 10°10′E
- Country: Gabon
- Province: Estuaire Province
- Department: Komo Department

Zoulameyong is a town in Komo Department, Estuaire Province, in north-western Gabon. It lies northeast of Kango and east of the N1 road.
