= Bitam Airport =

Airport in Woleu-Ntem, Gabon

Bitam Airport Aéroport de Bitame
- IATA: BMM; ICAO: FOOB

Summary
- Airport type: Public
- Serves: Bitam
- Elevation AMSL: 1,969 ft / 600 m
- Coordinates: 02°04′32″N 11°29′36″E

Map
- Location of the airport in Ga8bon

Runways
Direction	Length		Surface
Direction	m	ft	Surface
13/31	1,830	6,004	Laterite
- Sources: World Aero Data Google Maps

Bitam Airport (French: Aéroport de Bitame) (IATA: BMM, ICAO: FOOB) is an airport serving the town of Bitam in Woleu-Ntem Province, Gabon.

== See also ==
- List of airports in Gabon
- Transport in Gabon
