= GAX =

GAX or gax may refer to:

- Gamba Airport (IATA: GAX), an airport serving Gamba, Gabon
- Global International Airways (ICAO: GAX), a defunct American charter airline company based in Kansas City, Missouri
- Southern Oromo language (ISO 639-3: gax), a variety of Oromo spoken in southern Ethiopia and northern Kenya
