= Petit Bambam Airport =

Airstrip in Gabon

Petit Bam-Bam Airport Aéroport Petit Bambam
- IATA: none; ICAO: none

Summary
- Serves: Petit Bam-Bam
- Elevation AMSL: 338 ft / 103 m
- Coordinates: 0°29′00″S 9°35′30″E

Map
- Location of the airport in Gabon

Runways
Direction	Length		Surface
Direction	m	ft	Surface
08/26	1,000	3,281	Grass
- Source: Bing Maps HERE

Petit Bam-Bam Airport (French: Aéroport Petit Bambam) is an airstrip serving Petit Bam-Bam, an exposed geologic formation of white clay overlain with red clay on the border between Estuaire and Moyen-Ogooué Provinces in Gabon.

The airstrip is within Gabon's Wonga Wongue National Park, and is 3 kilometres (2 mi) east of Petit Bam‑bam. It is 13 kilometres (8 mi) southeast of the larger Grand Bam‑bam formation.

The Port Gentil VOR (Ident: PG) is located 52.7 nautical miles (98 km) west-southwest of the airstrip. The Libreville VOR-DME (Ident: LV) is located 58.6 nautical miles (109 km) north of the runway.

== See also ==
- List of airports in Gabon
- Transport in Gabon
