= Pectiniunguis minutus =

Scientific classification
- Kingdom: Animalia
- Phylum: Arthropoda
- Subphylum: Myriapoda
- Class: Chilopoda
- Order: Geophilomorpha
- Family: Schendylidae
- Genus: Pectiniunguis
- Species: P. minutus

Binomial name
- Pectiniunguis minutus (Demange, 1968)

Synonyms
- Pleuroschendyla minuta Demange, 1968

Species of centipede

Pectiniunguis minutus is a species of soil centipede in the family Schendylidae. This centipede is notable for its small size, reaching only 16 mm in length, and modest number of legs, with as few as 35 leg pairs, the minimum recorded in the genus Pectiniunguis. This centipede is the only species in this genus found in Africa.

== Discovery and distribution ==
This species was first described by the French myriapodologist Jean-Marie Demange in 1968. He based the original description of this species on an adult male holotype, an adult female allotype, an adult male paratype, and two other specimens, including an adult female. All five specimens were collected in 1963 from the Bélinga region in Gabon in western equatorial Africa. This centipede is known only from this type locality. All five specimens are deposited in the Muséum National d’Histoire Naturelle in Paris.

== Taxonomy ==
Demange originally described this species in 1968 under the name Pleuroschendyla minuta. In 1991, however, he and the Argentinian myriapodologist Luis Alberto Pereira placed this species in the genus Pectiniunguis. Accordingly, authorities now accept Pectiniunguis minutus as the valid name for this species.

== Ecology ==
This species is found in the tropical forest of the Bélinga region in Gabon, which is part of the Guineo-Congolian rainforest. The lowland tropical rainforest of Gabon is known for its biodiversity, which is well conserved by a low population density and an absence of intensive agricultural activity. The biodiversity in the Bélinga mountains, however, faces threats posed by iron mining and climate change.

== Description ==
This species can be distinguished from all other species of Pectiniunguis based on its small size, ranging from only 12 mm to 16 mm in length, and modest number of legs, with only 35 leg pairs in the males and only 37 or 39 in the females. Specimens (preserved in alcohol) are pale and yellowish. The dorsal plate on the head (cephalic plate) is slightly longer than wide, with a length/width ratio of about 1.1. All articles of each antenna are wider than long except for the most distal (fourteenth) article, which is longer than wide and features clavate sensory setae on the external side only.

The clypeus features a pair of setae behind the antennae, a pair of setae in front of the labrum, and a row of four median setae in between. The labrum features eighteen small teeth, with those in the center dark and rounded. Each of the mandibles features a dentate lamella with two blocks of teeth, one block with five teeth and the other with three, and a pectinate lamella with about twelve teeth that are translucent like glass. Lappets projects from the telopodites of the first maxillae. The coxosternite of the first maxillae lacks setae and features poorly developed lappets. Each claw of the second maxillae features two pectinate fringes, one with about fifteen teeth on the dorsal edge and the other with about twelve teeth on the ventral edge. The pleurites of the second maxillae are not fused with the posterior margin of the coxosternite.

When closed, the forcipules do not extend beyond the front of the head. Each article of the forcipule lacks teeth. The poison gland in each of the forcipules is unusually long, with the distal end extending into the ultimate article of the forcipule and the proximal part extending through the anterior half of the forcipular coxosternite.

The sternites feature fields of pores starting from the second leg-bearing segment. These pore fields may extend through only the 20th leg-bearing segment or as far as the 28th leg-bearing segment. Each pore field is undivided and shaped roughly like an ellipse that is broader along the transverse axis. The walking legs feature two pale and thin accessory spines on the ventral surface of each claw, one anterior spine and one posterior spine, both near the base of the claw.

The basal element of each of the ultimate legs (coxopleuron) features two large pores. Each pore connects to a coxal organ with a compound structure (with multiple ducts from distinct glands converging to connect to each pore) rather than a simple structure (with each pore connecting to a single gland through a single duct that does not branch). The distal end of each of the ultimate legs features a rudimentary tubercle with two small spines.

This species exhibits all the traits that characterize the genus Pectiniunguis. For example, like other species in this genus, this centipede features claws on the second maxillae with rows of filaments on the dorsal and ventral edges, second maxillae with pleurites not fused to the posterior border of the coxosternite, and sternites with pore fields on at least some segments. Furthermore, as in other species in this genus, each of the ultimate legs features two pores on the coxopleuron, with each pore connected to a compound coxal organ, and a distal end without a claw.

This centipede shares an especially distinctive set of traits with two other species in this genus, P. aequatorialis and P. ascendens, both found in South America. In particular, in this genus, only these three species feature pore fields that are limited to the sternites of the anterior segments. Furthermore, all three species feature accessory spines on the walking legs that are thin and pale rather than strong and dark.

The species P. minutus can be distinguished from these two South American species, however, based on other traits. For example, each of the South American species features more legs than P. minutus, with at least 43 leg pairs in P. ascendens and 45 pairs in P. aequatorialis, and can reach larger sizes than P. minutus, with P. aequatorialis reaching 19 mm in length and P. ascendens reaching 33 mm in length. Furthermore, both of these South American species feature three accessory spines (one anterior and two posterior) on the claws of the walking legs, where P. minutus features only two spines. Moreover, the lappets on the coxosternite of the first maxillae are poorly developed in P. minutus but well developed in the other two species.
