= Tchongorove Airport =

Tchongorove Airport Aéroport de Tchongorove
- IATA: IGE; ICAO: FOOI

Summary
- Airport type: Public
- Serves: Iguéla
- Elevation AMSL: 20 ft (6.1 m)
- Coordinates: 1°55′10″S 9°18′50″E

Map
- Location in Gabon

Runways
Direction	Length		Surface
Direction	m	ft	Surface
15/33	1,500	4,921	Sand
- Runway has 700 metres (2,300 ft) usable. Sources: GCM Google Maps T. Gabon

Tchongorove Airport (French: Aéroport de Tchongorove) (IATA: IGE, ICAO: FOOI) is an airstrip serving Iguéla, a sport fishing center in Ogooué-Maritime Province, Gabon. The runway is on a narrow peninsula on the ocean side of the Iguéla Lagoon

The Gavilo Lodge has a 500 metres (1,600 ft) sand airstrip 2 kilometres (1.2 mi) north of Tchongorove Airport, on the mainland side of the lagoon.

== See also ==
- List of airports in Gabon
- Transport in Gabon
