= Minvoul Airport =

Airport in Gabon

Minvoul Airport Aéroport de Minvoul
- IATA: MVX; ICAO: FOGV

Summary
- Serves: Minvoul
- Elevation AMSL: 1,969 ft / 600 m
- Coordinates: 2°09′10″N 12°06′25″E

Map
- Location in Gabon

Runways
Direction	Length		Surface
Direction	m	ft	Surface
11/29	1,100	3,609	Grass
- Sources: HERE Maps GCM

Minvoul Airport (French: Aéroport de Minvoul, IATA: MVX, ICAO: FOGV) is an airport serving the town of Minvoul in the Woleu-Ntem Province of Gabon.

== See also ==
- List of airports in Gabon
- Transport in Gabon
