= Lastourville Airport =

Airport in Gabon

Limbengua Airport Aéroport de Limbengua
- IATA: LTL; ICAO: FOOR

Summary
- Serves: Lastourville
- Elevation AMSL: 1,585 ft / 483 m
- Coordinates: 0°49′30″S 12°44′55″E

Map
- Location in Gabon

Runways
Direction	Length		Surface
Direction	m	ft	Surface
06/24	1,900	6,234	Grass
- Sources: Google Maps GCM

Limbengua Airport (French: Aéroport de Limbengua) (IATA: LTL, ICAO: FOOR) is an airport serving the city of Lastourville in the Ogooué-Lolo Province of Gabon. The runway is 2.5 kilometres (1.6 mi) southeast of the town.

== See also ==
- List of airports in Gabon
- Transport in Gabon
