= Santa Clara, Gabon =

- Location in Gabon
- Coordinates: 0°30′20.6″N 9°19′06.53″E
- Country: Gabon
- Province: Estuaire Province
- Elevation: 948 ft (289 m)

Cape Santa Clara, Gabon is a peninsula extending from the Gabon Estuary near the port of Owendo.

== Overview ==
The larger peninsula that separates the Gabon estuary from Corisco Bay, the cape juts into the mouth of the estuary.

The cape is near Libreville, the capital city of Gabon

The Santa Clara Rock Formation is also visible.

== Transport ==
Cape Santa Clara is the proposed site for a new port for the export of iron ore from Belinga.

== See also ==
- Gabon Estuary
- Railway stations in Gabon
