= Lifouta =

Coordinates: 01°03′00″S 13°04′00″E

Lifouta is a village in Ogooué-Lolo Province, Gabon. It is located near the settlements of Manenga and Dibangama. Local livelihoods include logging, hunting and fishing.

== Transport ==
Lifouta is served by a station on the Trans-Gabon Railway. Railway renewal work was carried out in the Lifouta area during 2025 as part of a wider modernization program for the railway.

== See also ==
- Railway stations in Gabon
