= Bidoungui Airport =

Airport in Haut-Ogooué, Gabon

Bidoungui Airport Aéroport de Bidoungui
- IATA: none; ICAO: none

Summary
- Serves: Bakoumba
- Elevation AMSL: 1,995 ft / 608 m
- Coordinates: 1°46′25″S 13°02′15″E

Map
- Location in Gabon

Runways
Direction	Length		Surface
Direction	m	ft	Surface
09/27	1,380	4,528	Grass
- Sources: Google Maps GCM

Bidoungui Airport (French: Aéroport de Bidoungui) is an airport serving the village of Bakoumba in the Haut-Ogooué Province of Gabon. The runway is 6 kilometres (3.7 mi) north of the village

== See also ==
- List of airports in Gabon
- Transport in Gabon
