= Mitzic Airport =

Airport in Gabon

Mitzic Airport Aéroport Mitzic
- IATA: MZC; ICAO: FOOM

Summary
- Serves: Mitzic
- Elevation AMSL: 1,913 ft / 583 m
- Coordinates: 0°46′40″N 11°33′10″E

Map
- Location in Gabon

Runways
Direction	Length		Surface
Direction	m	ft	Surface
16/34	1,400	4,593	Grass
- Sources: Google Maps GCM

Mitzic Airport (French: Aéroport Mitzic) (IATA: FOOM, ICAO: MZC) was an airport serving the town of Mitzic in the Woleu-Ntem Province of Gabon. The runway is within the village. The airport has been decommissioned.

== See also ==
- List of airports in Gabon
- Transport in Gabon
