= Abanayop =

- Village
- Location in Equatorial Guinea
- Coordinates: 0°59′N 10°56′E
- Country: Equatorial Guinea; Gabon
- Province (EQG) Province (GAB): Centro Sur; Woleu-Ntem
- Time zone: UTC+1 (WAT)

Abanayop is a village on the Gabon-Equatorial Guinea border. It lies along the N5 road (Gabon). On Google Maps, the village is shown within the territory of Gabon, but on other database websites it is listed as a settlement within Equatorial Guinea.
