= Léboka Airport =

Airport in Gabon

Léboka Airport Aéroport de Léboka
- IATA: none; ICAO: none; LID: FO12

Summary
- Airport type: Public
- Serves: Mounana
- Elevation AMSL: 1,985 ft / 605 m
- Coordinates: 1°22′15″S 13°12′00″E

Map
- Location in Gabon

Runways
Direction	Length		Surface
Direction	m	ft	Surface
01/19	2,000	6,562	Grass
- Sources: GCM HERE Maps T. Gabon

Léboka Airport (French: Aéroport de Léboka) is an airstrip serving the town of Mounana in Haut-Ogooué Province, Gabon. The runway is on a wooded mesa 4.5 kilometres (2.8 mi) east of the town.

== See also ==
- List of airports in Gabon
- Transport in Gabon
