= Fougamou Airport =

Airport in Gabon

Fougamou Airport Aéroport Fougamou
- IATA: FOU; ICAO: FOGF

Summary
- Serves: Fougamou
- Elevation AMSL: 262 ft / 80 m
- Coordinates: 1°16′40″S 10°36′45″E

Map
- Location in Gabon

Runways
Direction	Length		Surface
Direction	m	ft	Surface
18/36	1,600	5,249	Grass
- Sources: Google Maps GCM

Fougamou Airport (French: Aéroport Fougamou) (IATA: FOU, ICAO: FOGF) is an airport serving the village of Fougamou in the Ngounié Province of Gabon. The runway is 7 kilometres (4.3 mi) south of the village

== See also ==
- List of airports in Gabon
- Transport in Gabon
