= Mayumba Airport =

Airport in Gabon

Mayumba Airport Aéroport Mayumba
- IATA: MYB; ICAO: FOOY

Summary
- Serves: Mayumba
- Elevation AMSL: 13 ft / 4 m
- Coordinates: 3°27′30″S 10°40′35″E

Map
- Location in Gabon

Runways
Direction	Length		Surface
Direction	m	ft	Surface
12/30	1,800	5,906	Asphalt
- Sources: Google Maps GCM

Mayumba Airport (French: Aéroport Mayumba) (IATA: FOOY, ICAO: MYB) is an airport serving the town of Mayumba in the Nyanga Province of Gabon. The runway is 3 kilometres (1.9 mi) southeast of the town.

== See also ==
- List of airports in Gabon
- Transport in Gabon
