= KDJ =

KDJ or kdj may refer to:

- Karamojong language (ISO 639-3:kdj), spoken in Uganda
- Ndjolé Ville Airport (IATA:KDJ), Gabon
