= Cocobeach Airport =

Airport in Estuaire, Gabon

Cocobeach Airport Aéroport Cocobeach
- IATA: none; ICAO: FOOC

Summary
- Airport type: Public
- Serves: Cocobeach
- Elevation AMSL: 69 ft / 21 m
- Coordinates: 0°58′55″N 9°34′20″E

Map
- Location in Gabon

Runways
Direction	Length		Surface
Direction	ft	m	Surface
Closed
- Sources: GCM Google Maps T. Gabon

Cocobeach Airport (French: Aéroport Cocobeach) (ICAO: FOOC) was an airstrip formerly serving Cocobeach, in Estuaire Province, Gabon. A 2015 satellite image shows that the runway has houses built on it, with no unobstructed stretch greater than 250 metres (820 ft).

== See also ==
- List of airports in Gabon
- Transport in Gabon
