= Alembe =

- Location in Gabon
- Coordinates: 00°5′0″N 10°56′0″E
- Country: Gabon
- Province: Moyen-Ogooué

Alembe is a small town in western Gabon.

== Transport ==
It is served by a station of the Trans-Gabon Railway.

== See also ==
- Transport in Gabon
