= Synodontis tessmanni =

Conservation status
- Least Concern (IUCN 3.1)

Scientific classification
- Kingdom: Animalia
- Phylum: Chordata
- Class: Actinopterygii
- Order: Siluriformes
- Family: Mochokidae
- Genus: Synodontis
- Species: S. tessmanni

Binomial name
- Synodontis tessmanni Pappenheim, 1911

Species of fish

Synodontis tessmanni is a species of upside-down catfish endemic to Cameroon where it is only known from the Ntem River. This species grows to a length of 18.6 centimetres (7.3 in) TL.
