= Omboué Hospital Airport =

Omboué Hospital Airport Aéroport Hôpital Omboué
- IATA: OMB; ICAO: FOOH

Summary
- Serves: Omboué
- Elevation AMSL: 33 ft / 10 m
- Coordinates: 1°34′29″S 9°15′46″E

Map
- Location of the airport in Gabon

Runways
Direction	Length		Surface
Direction	m	ft	Surface
14/32	1,610	5,282	Asphalt
- Source: GCM Google Maps

Omboué Airport (French: Aéroport d'Omboué) (IATA: MDV, ICAO: FOOH) is an airport serving Omboué in Ogooué-Maritime Province, Gabon.

== See also ==
- List of airports in Gabon
- Transport in Gabon
