= Gamba Airport =

Airport in Gamba, Gabon

Gamba Airport Aéroport Gamba
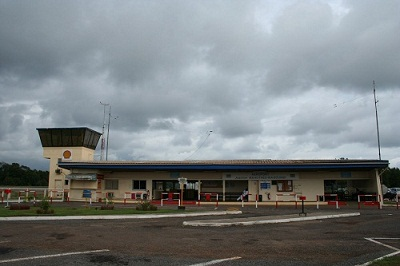
- Terminal
- IATA: GAX; ICAO: FOGX

Summary
- Owner/Operator: Shell Gabon
- Location: Gamba
- Elevation AMSL: 30 ft / 9 m
- Coordinates: 02°47′07″S 10°02′50″E

Map
- Location in Gabon

Runways
Direction	Length		Surface
Direction	m	ft	Surface
13/31	1,800	5,906	Asphalt
- Source: Gamba SCD Aviation GCM Google Maps

Gamba Airport (French: Aéroport Gamba) (IATA: GAX, ICAO: FOGX) is an airport serving Gamba, Gabon. The airport is near the Yenzi camp, 7 kilometres (4.3 mi) southeast of Gamba.

== See also ==
- List of airports in Gabon
- Transport in Gabon
