= Setté Cama Hunting Area =

Protected area in Gabon

Coordinates: 2.4410°S 10.1115°E

Designations

Ramsar Wetland
- Official name: Setté Cama
- Designated: 30 December 1986
- Reference no.: 353

The Setté Cama Hunting Area is a wildlife reserve and hunting concession near the village of Setté Cama in Gabon. It was established in 1966.This site covers 2,400.82 km^{2}.

Characteristic of this area is significant biodiversity, in addition to 15 species of bats, 75 species of reptiles and amphibians, 450 species of birds, this area is also important for several endangered mammals, such as elephants, duikers and hippos. People from the local community use this area for agriculture and traditional fishing.
