= Pectiniunguis fijiensis =

Scientific classification
- Kingdom: Animalia
- Phylum: Arthropoda
- Subphylum: Myriapoda
- Class: Chilopoda
- Order: Geophilomorpha
- Family: Schendylidae
- Genus: Pectiniunguis
- Species: P. fijiensis

Binomial name
- Pectiniunguis fijiensis (Chamberlin, 1920)

Synonyms
- Adenoschendyla fijiensis Chamberlin, 1920

Species of centipede

Pectiniunguis fijiensis is a species of soil centipede in the Schendylidae family. This centipede is found in Fiji. This centipede is the only species in the genus Pectiniunguis found in Oceania.

== Discovery and distribution ==
This species was first described in 1920 by the American myriapodologist Ralph Vary Chamberlin. He based the original description of this species on three type specimens, a female holotype and two paratypes, including at least one more female. The American zoologist William M. Mann collected all three specimens, which are deposited in the Museum of Comparative Zoology at Harvard University. Mann found the holotype and a paratype at Vanua Ava and a female paratype at Lomati, both sites located in Fiji. This species is known only from Fiji.

== Taxonomy ==
Chamberlin originally described this species in 1920 under the name Adenoschendyla fijiensis. In 1923, however, he deemed Adenoschendyla to be a junior synonym of Pectiniunguis. Accordingly, in 1929, the Austrian myriapodologist Carl Attems included this centipede among the species in the genus Pectiniunguis. Authorities now accept Pectiniunguis fijiensis as the valid name for this species.

== Description ==
This species can reach 50 mm in length and can feature from 59 to 63 pairs of legs. Specimens (preserved in alcohol) are mostly yellowish, but the antennae, head, and anterior segments are light orange. The middle third of the body is wider than the rest of the trunk. The antennae are about 2.7 times longer than the head. The head is shaped like a rounded rectangle that is slightly longer than wide, with a length/width ratio of 1.1. The clypeus features a pair of setae behind the antennae, another pair in front of the labrum, and a transverse row of six setae in between. The labrum features six robust teeth in the middle, with six or seven paler and more pointed lateral teeth on each side. Each of the mandibles features a dentate lamella with two blocks of teeth (three teeth in one block and four in the other) and a pectinate lamella with 14 or 15 simple teeth that are translucent like glass.

Lappets project from the coxosternite as well as the telopodites of the first maxillae. The claw at the end of each of the second maxillae features a dorsal comb with eight or nine teeth and a ventral comb with six or seven teeth. The forcipular coxosternite lacks chitin lines, and each article of the forcipule lacks teeth.

The ventral surface of the claws on the walking legs feature thee setae (one anterior seta and two posterior setae) at the base of each claw. The sternites feature pores starting with the second or third segment and extending to the antepenultimate segment, except for some sternites in the middle of posterior part of the body that lack pores. Both the tergite and the sternite of the last leg-bearing segment are shaped like trapezoids that are wider along the anterior margin than they are long. The basal element of each of the ultimate legs (coxopleuron) features two pores. Each pore connects to a compound organ (with multiple ducts from distinct glands converging to connect to each pore) rather than a simple organ (with each pore connecting to a single gland through a single duct that does not branch). Each of the ultimate legs features six articles in addition to the coxopleuron, but the distal end of each of the ultimate legs lacks a claw, which is replaced by a small tubercle bearing one to four small spines.
