= Gamba, Gabon =

Gamba N´gamb
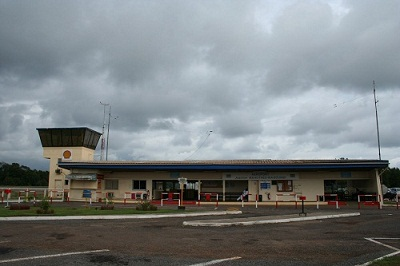
- Gamba Airport

- Coat of arms

- Location in Gabon
- Coordinates: 2°43′30″S 10°1′0″E
- Country: Gabon
- Province: Ogooué-Maritime Province
- Department: Ndougou Department

Government
  - Mayor: Thom

Population (2013)
  - Total: 10,454

Gamba (Lumbu: N´gamb) is a small town in Gabon lying on the southern bay of the Ndogo Lagoon.

== History ==
Historically, the area was populated by gatherer-hunter-fishermen autochthons scattered in small villages around the Ndogo Lagoon and the Yenzi Lake.

With the discovery in 1967 of a major oil field by Shell in the area, the town boomed and immigration of workers from various other parts of the country resulted in the population today of over 10000 people. Though production from the Gamba field is now only a fraction of what it once was, Gamba remains an important and strategic oil hub, being one of only two oil terminals in Gabon (the other one being Cape Lopez).

== Population ==
Most people live in the heart of the town, divided into five blocks called "Plaines", while most senior Shell staff live in Yenzi, half a dozen miles away from the heart of the city near the Gamba Airport and the oil terminal.

The Balumbu people are known to be the autochthons of the region, even though the Punu and Fang people are now possibly the majority ethnic groups present.

== Etymology ==
The name Gamba stands for fog in Vili, probably because of the foggy weather during the dry season.

== Economy ==
Gamba attracts many tourists from all over the world because of its remarkable biodiversity, and the proximity of Sette Cama and the Loango National Park. As a result of all that activity, life in Gamba is very expensive, and the ongoing economic crisis makes things more difficult for residents.

== Education ==
Schools include:

- École Yenzi-Shell-Gabon (now closed)
