= Belinga =

Location in Gabon

Coordinates: 01°08′00″N 13°07′00″E

Belinga is a location in Gabon with as yet unexploited iron ore deposits. These ore deposits extend into neighbouring Cameroon and Congo.

== Mining ==
The Belinga iron reserves were discovered in 1895. They are estimated to hold about one billion tons of iron ore.

Iron ore mining was expected to start in 2011 but due to a lack of financing the project was currently on hold.

Because of slowness in getting the project started, the Chinese rights may be in 2012 given to BHP.

In 2023, Fortescue started exporting two million tonnes of ore using road and rail transport to reach the port of Owendo.

== Transport ==
A 237 km long railway branch line is proposed branching from Booue to enable these deposits to be exploited. As the tonneages hauled will be greatly increased, this line may also extend to a port at Santa Clara which would extend the railway to 560 km.

The town is near the Republic of Congo and Cameroon borders.

== See also ==
- Iron ore in Africa
- Railway stations in Gabon
