= N5 road (Gabon) =

Road in Gabon

Location
- Country: Gabon

Highway system
- Transport in Gabon

The N5 road is one of the national highways of Gabon. It is connects Kougouleu to Médouneu to Bibasse.
