= Pectiniunguis =

Scientific classification
- Kingdom: Animalia
- Phylum: Arthropoda
- Subphylum: Myriapoda
- Class: Chilopoda
- Order: Geophilomorpha
- Family: Schendylidae
- Genus: Pectiniunguis; Bollman, 1889

Type species
- Pectiniunguis americanus Bollman, 1889

Synonyms
- Adenoschendyla Brölemann & Ribaut, 1911; Litoschendyla Chamberlin, 1923

Genus of centipedes

Pectiniunguis is a genus of centipedes in the family Schendylidae. This genus is among the most diverse and widespread genera in this family, with species found in the Western Hemisphere, Africa, and Oceania. This genus contains 24 species.

== Distribution ==
These centipedes are found not only in the tropical and subtropical regions of the Americas but also in West Africa and Fiji. One species (P. minutus) is found in Gabon, and one species (P. fijiensis) is found in Fiji. All the other species in this genus are found in the Western Hemisphere, where species of Pectiniunguis have been recorded in the United States, Mexico, Cuba, the West Indies, Colombia, Venezuela, Guyana, Brazil, and Argentina, as well as both mainland Ecuador and the Galápagos Islands.

== Taxonomy ==
This genus was introduced in 1889 by the American naturalist Charles Harvey Bollman. He included in this new genus a newly discovered species, P. americanus, which he described and designated as the type species. He based this description on an adult female specimen found in Mexico.

In 1911, the French zoologists Henri W. Brölemann and Henri Ribaut described Adenoschendyla as a new genus. In 1923, however, the American biologist Ralph V. Chamberlin deemed Adenoschendyla to be a junior synonym of Pectiniunguis. At the same time, he also proposed Litoschendyla as a new genus with the Cuban species P. insulanus as its type species. In 1959, however, the American myriapodologist Ralph E. Crabill, Jr. deemed Litoschendyla to be a junior synonym of Pectiniunguis. Authorities now consider both Adenoschendyla and Litoschendyla to be junior synonyms of Pectiniunguis.

== Description ==
Centipedes in this genus feature second maxillae that each end in a claw fringed by two rows of filaments, one on the dorsal edge and the other on the ventral edge. The pleurites of the second maxillae are not fused to the posterior margin of the adjacent coxosternite. The sternites feature transversally elliptical fields of pores on at least some trunk segments. The basal element of each of the ultimate legs (coxopleuron) features two pores. These pores connect to coxal organs with a composite structure (with multiple ducts from distinct glands converging to connect to each pore) rather than a simple structure (with each pore connecting to a single gland through a single duct that does not branch). The distal end of each of the ultimate legs lacks a claw, which is either absent or replaced by a small spine or a hairy tubercle.

These centipedes range from 16 mm to 67 mm in length and feature 35 to 73 pairs of legs. The African species P. minutus is notable not only for being the smallest in this genus (no more than 16 mm in length) but also for having as few as 35 leg pairs (35 in males, 37 or 39 in females), the minimum number in this genus. The Brazilian species P. ducalis is notable not only for being the largest in this genus (up to 67 mm in length) but also for having as many as 73 leg pairs (63 to 71 in males, 65 to 73 in females), the maximum number in this genus.

== Phylogeny ==
A phylogenetic analysis of the order Geophilomorpha using both molecular data and morphology places a representative of the genus Pectiniunguis (P. argentinensis) in a clade with a representative of Schendylops, another genus in the family Schendylidae. This phylogenetic tree suggests that the genera Pectiniunguis and Schencylops are more closely related to one another than any other genera included in this analysis. These two close relatives form a sister group for another genus in the same family, Nannophilus, which emerges as the next closest relative included in this analysis. Without a similar phylogenetic analysis of the numerous species assigned to the genus Pectiniunguis, however, it remains unclear whether this genus represents a monophyletic group.

The closely related genera Pectiniunguis and Schendylops share an extensive set of traits. For example, both of these genera feature claws on the second maxillae with rows of filaments on the dorsal and ventral edges, second maxillae with pleurites not fused to the posterior border of the coxosternite, and sternites with pore fields on at least some segments. Furthermore, in both genera, each of the ultimate legs features two pores on the coxopleuron and a distal end with no claw, which is either absent or replaced by a small spine or hairy tubercle. These two genera can be distinguished, however, based on the coxal organs of the coxopleuron, which have a composite structure in Pectiniunguis but a simple structure in Schendylops.

== Species ==
This genus includes the following species:

- Pectiniunguis aequatorialis Pereira, 2018
- Pectiniunguis albemarlensis Chamberlin, 1914
- Pectiniunguis americanus Bollman, 1889
- Pectiniunguis amphibius Chamberlin, 1923
- Pectiniunguis argentinensis Pereira & Coscarón, 1975
- Pectiniunguis ascendens Pereira, Minelli & Barbieri, 1994
- Pectiniunguis bolbonyx (Brölemann & Ribaut, 1912)
- Pectiniunguis bollmani Pereira, Minelli & Foddai, 1999
- Pectiniunguis catalinensis Chamberlin, 1941
- Pectiniunguis chazaliei (Brölemann, 1900)
- Pectiniunguis ducalis Pereira, Minelli & Barbieri, 1995
- Pectiniunguis fijiensis (Chamberlin, 1920)
- Pectiniunguis gaigei (Chamberlin, 1921)
- Pectiniunguis geayi (Brölemann & Ribaut, 1911)
- Pectiniunguis halirrhytus Crabill, 1959
- Pectiniunguis imperfossus (Brölemann, 1902)
- Pectiniunguis insulanus Brölemann & Ribaut, 1911
- Pectiniunguis krausi Shear & Peck, 1992
- Pectiniunguis minutus (Demange, 1968)
- Pectiniunguis nesiotes Chamberlin, 1923
- Pectiniunguis pauperatus Silvestri, 1907
- Pectiniunguis pectinatus (Attems, 1934)
- Pectiniunguis plusiodontus Attems, 1903
- Pectiniunguis roigi Pereira, Foddai & Minelli, 2001
