= Lambaréné Airport =

Airport in Gabon

Lambaréné Airport Aéroport de Lambaréné
- IATA: LBQ; ICAO: FOGR

Summary
- Serves: Lambaréné
- Elevation AMSL: 82 ft / 25 m
- Coordinates: 0°42′15″S 10°14′45″E

Map
- Location in Gabon

Runways
Direction	Length		Surface
Direction	m	ft	Surface
05/23	1,730	5,676	Asphalt
- Sources: HERE Maps GCM

Lambaréné Airport (French: Aéroport de Lambaréné) (IATA: LBQ, ICAO: FOGR) is an airport serving the city of Lambaréné in the Moyen-Ogooué Province of Gabon. The runway has and additional 380 metres (1,250 ft) of unpaved overrun on the northeastern end.

The Lambarene non-directional beacon (Ident: LB) is located southwest of the field.

== See also ==
- List of airports in Gabon
- Transport in Gabon
