= Lopé (department) =

Coordinates: 00°06′S 11°56′E

Lope
- Department
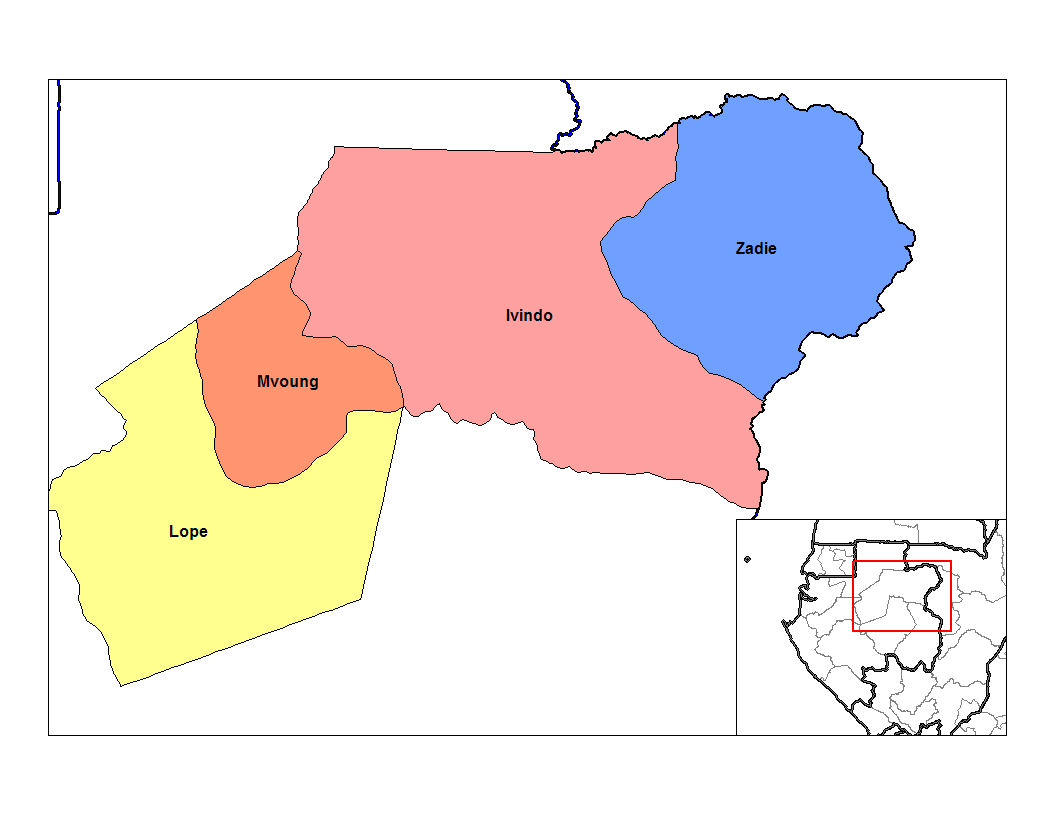
- Lope Department in the region
- Country: Gabon
- Province: Ogooué-Ivindo Province

Population (2013 Census)
  - Total: 12,382
- Time zone: UTC+1 (GMT +1)

Lopé is the southwestern department of Ogooué-Ivindo Province and is in the center of Gabon. The capital lies at Booué. This is the department with the most land in the Southern Hemisphere. It had a population of 12,382 in 2013.
