= Ndjolé Ville Airport =

Ville Airport Aéroport de Ndjolé Ville
- IATA: KDJ; ICAO: FOGJ

Summary
- Serves: Ndjolé, Gabon
- Elevation AMSL: 164 ft / 50 m
- Coordinates: 0°11′20″S 10°45′40″E

Map
- Location in Gabon

Runways
Direction	Length		Surface
Direction	m	ft	Surface
02/20	800	2,625	Dirt
- Sources: GCM Google Maps

Ville Airport (French: Aéroport de Ndjolé Ville) (IATA: KDJ, ICAO: FOGJ) is an airport serving the town of Ndjolé in the Moyen-Ogooué Province of Gabon.

== See also ==
- List of airports in Gabon
- Transport in Gabon
