= Dola (department) =

Coordinates: 2°12′S 11°34′E

- Department
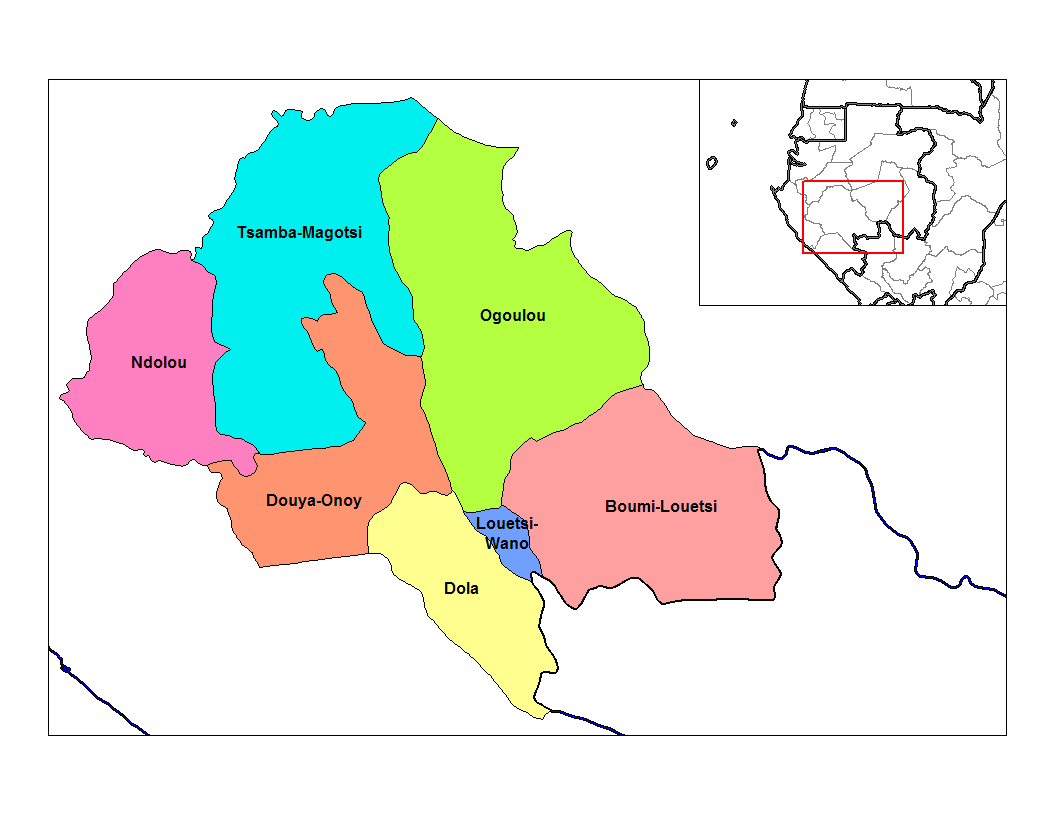
- Dola Department in the region
- Country: Gabon
- Province: Ngounié Province

Population (2013 Census)
  - Total: 6,979
- Time zone: UTC+1 (GMT +1)

Dola is a department of Ngounié Province in southern Gabon. The capital lies at Ndendé. It had a population of 6,979 in 2013.
