= Douglas Yates =

- Born: Hollywood, California, USA
- Occupations: Political scientist, author
- Known for: Rentier theory, African politics

Douglas A. Yates is an American political scientist residing in Paris. He specializes in African politics and the politics of the oil industry in Africa and is known for his development of rentier state theory. He has authored or co-authored several books on the subject.

== Biography ==
Yates was born in Hollywood, California in 1964. He earned his PhD in political science from Boston University in 1994 and moved to Paris in 1996. He has since written on neo-colonialism and the oil industry in Africa. He has authored or co-authored five books on the subject, including The Scramble for African Oil and The Rentier State in Africa.

Yates has collaborated with the Africa Regional Services of the United States Department of State as a speaker in its democracy promotion programs, travelling various African countries on training missions for government electoral workers, press corps, and judicial officers. Yates is also a regular contributor on CNBC, France 24 and Al Jazeera.

Douglas Yates currently serves as a Professor of Anglo-American Law at the Cergy-Pontoise University and as a Professor of international relations and African politics at the American Graduate School in Paris.

== Bibliography ==
- Yates, Douglas (2022). "Gabon and Togo join the Commonwealth". The Round Table. 111 (5): 634–635. doi:10.1080/00358533.2022.2130622. S2CID 253247804.
- Yates, Douglas (2021). "Dynastic rule in Syria and North Korea: Nepotism, succession, and sibling rivalry". International Political Science Review. 43 (3): 450–463. doi:10.1177/0192512120978562. S2CID 234178710.
- The Scramble for African Oil: Oppression, Corruption and War for Control of Africa's Natural Resources. London: Pluto Press. 2012. ISBN 978-0745330457.
- The French Oil Industry and the Corps des Mines in Africa. Trenton/Amsara: Africa World Press. 2009. ISBN 978-1592216673.
- Historical Dictionary of Gabon. Lanham: Scarecrow Press. 2006. ISBN 978-0810849181.
- Oil Policy in the Gulf of Guinea: Security & Conflict, Economic Growth, Social Development. Bonn: Friedrich Ebert Stiftung. 2004. ISBN 978-3898922708.
- The Rentier State in Africa: Oil Rent Dependency and Neocolonialism in the Republic of Gabon. Trenton/Amsara: Africa World Press. 1996. ISBN 0865435219.
