= Mayumba National Park =

National park in Gabon

- IUCN category II (national park)
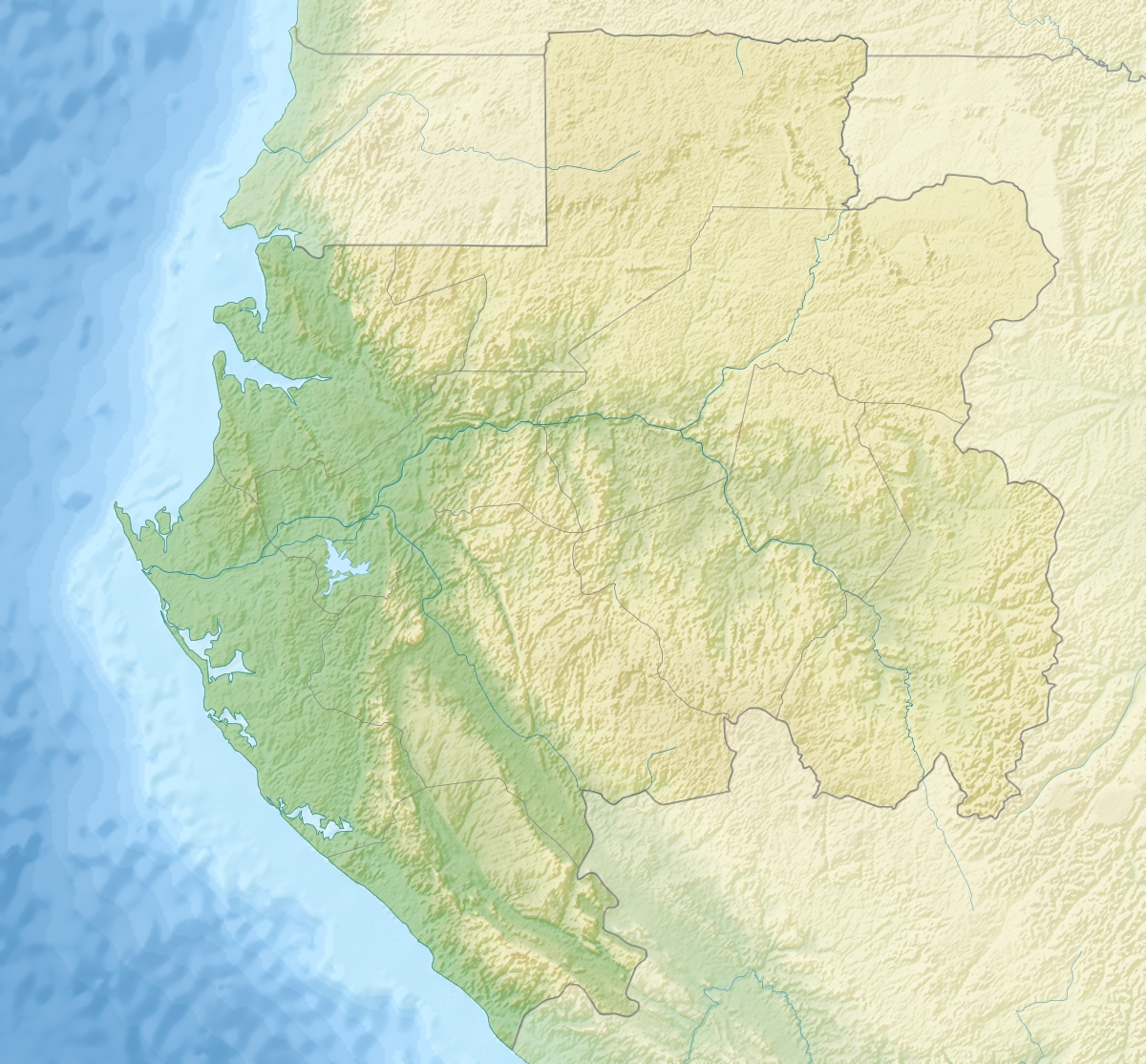
- Location within Gabon
- Location: Gabon
- Nearest city: Mayumba
- Coordinates: 03°48′00″S 11°00′45″E
- Area: 870 km^{2} (340 sq mi)
- Established: 2002
- Governing body: National Agency for National Parks

Mayumba National Park (French: Parc national de Mayumba) is a national park in southwestern Gabon. It is a thin tongue of beach, dunes, savanna, and rain-forest in the extreme south of the country, between Mayumba and the Congo border. Mayumba National Park shelters 60 km of the most important leatherback turtle nesting beaches on Earth and is home to unique coastal vegetation and a variety of terrestrial animals, including forest elephants, buffaloes, leopards, gorillas, chimpanzees, antelopes, crocodiles, hippos, and several species of monkeys. It also stretches for 15 km out to sea, protecting important marine habitats for dolphins, sharks, and migrating humpback whales. It is Gabon's only primarily marine park.
