= Ntem (department) =

Coordinates: 2°4′40″N 11°29′20″E

- Department
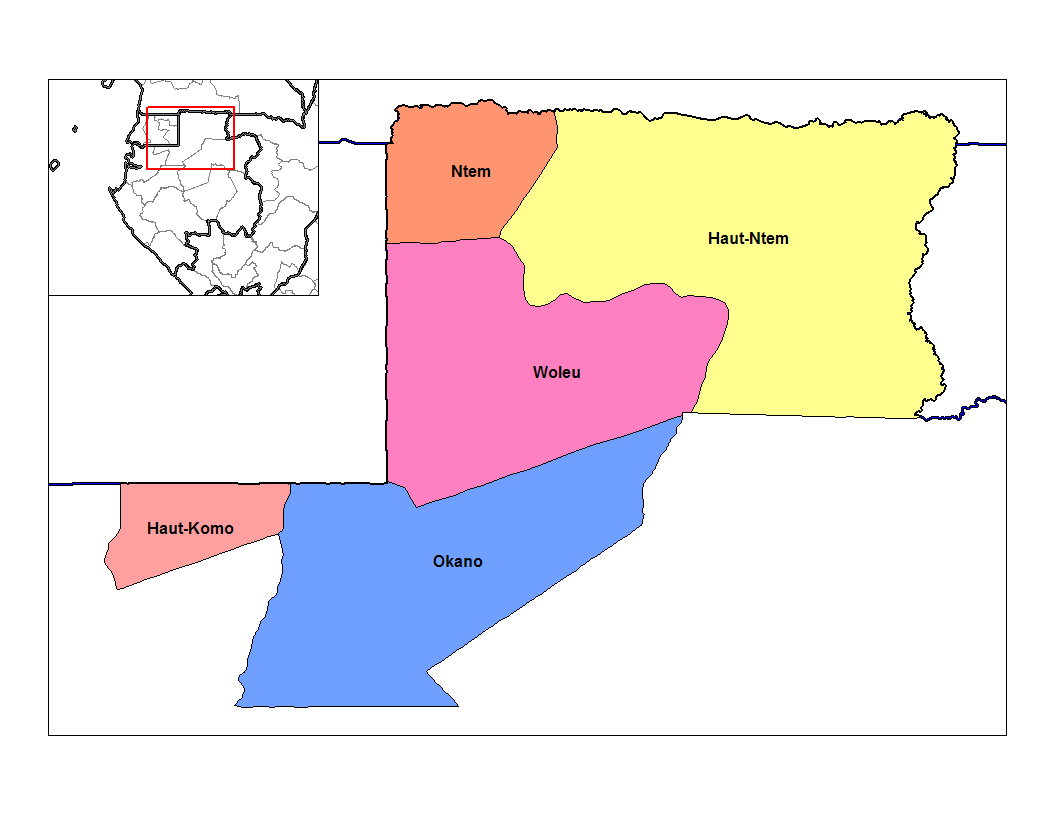
- Ntem Department in the region
- Country: Gabon
- Province: Woleu-Ntem Province

Population (2013 Census)
  - Total: 49,712
- Time zone: UTC+1 (GMT +1)

Ntem is a department of Woleu-Ntem Province in northern Gabon. The capital lies at Bitam. It borders Equatorial Guinea and Cameroon. It had a population of 49,712 in 2013.

== Towns and villages ==
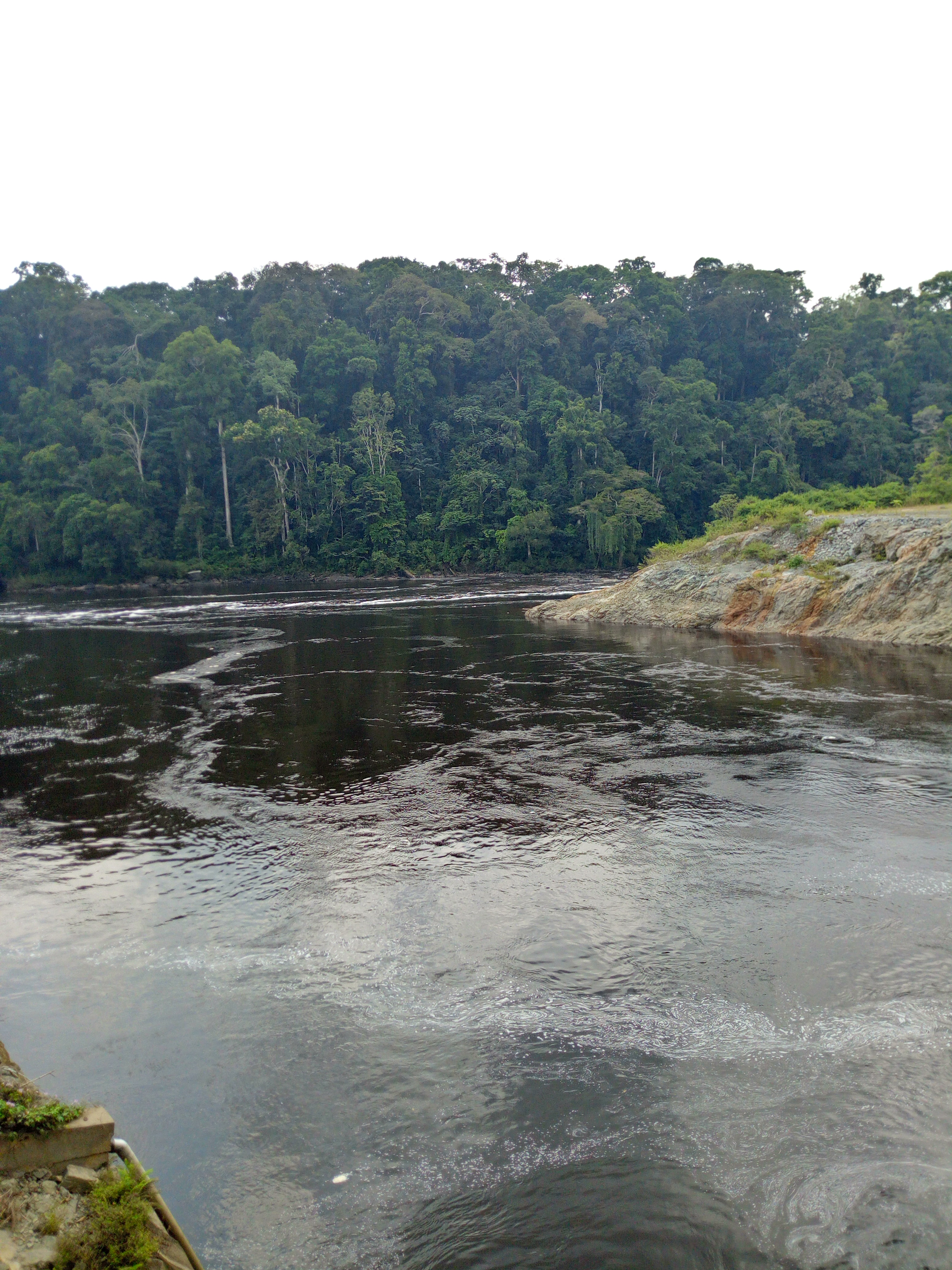
Ntem river, Cameroon South region (tropical forest)

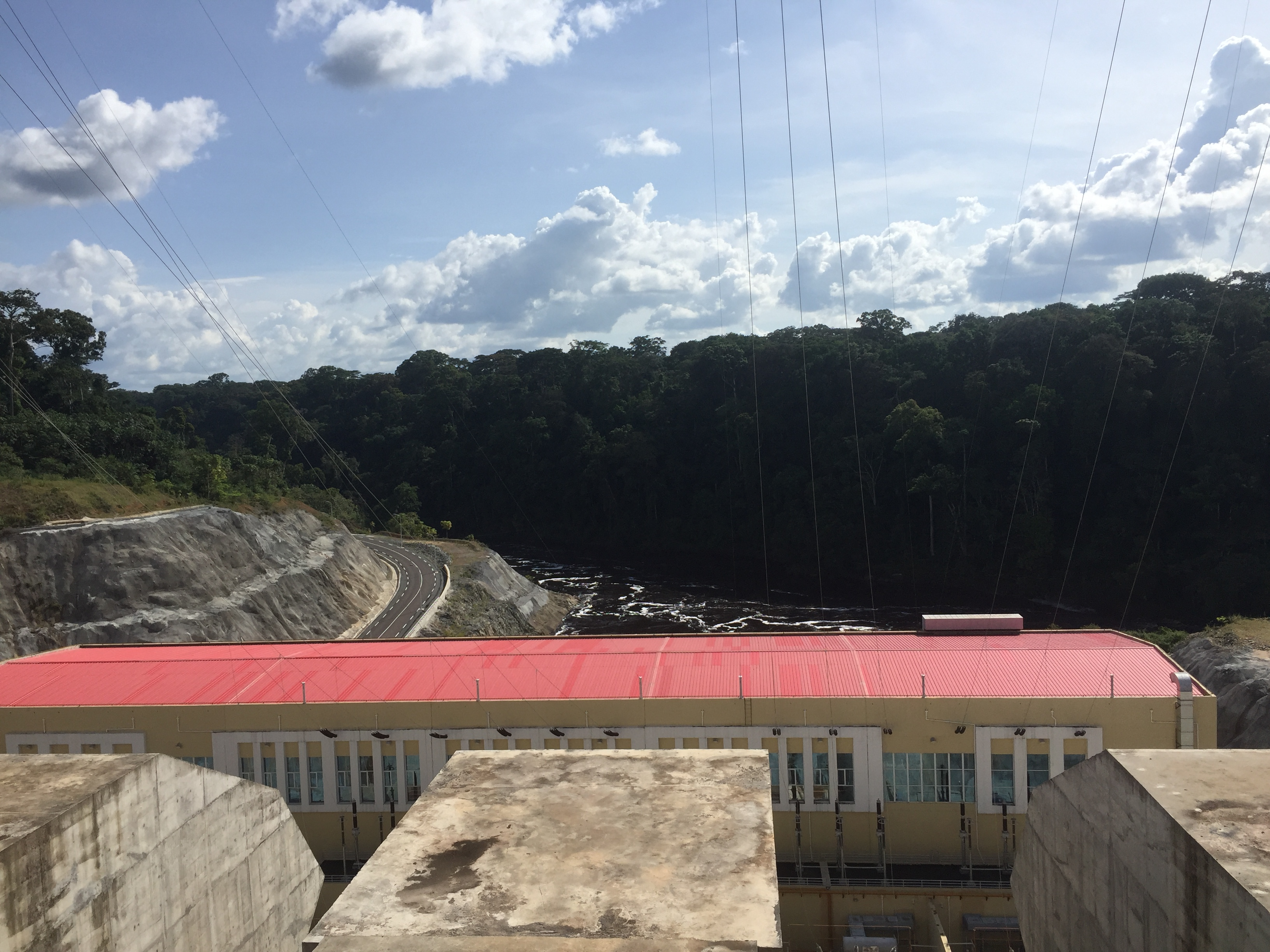
Dam on Ntem River
