= She's in London =

British LGBT web series set in London, England

She's in London is a British LGBT web series set in London, England. The series is composed of six ten-minute episodes and revolves around the closure of a fictional lesbian Soho bar and a love triangle between a bar tender, her best friend and her best friend's ex. It stars Miri, Clare Hopes, and Joanna Ludlow and is distributed via the US-based subscription site TelloFilms. She's in London marks the first non-US series for TelloFilms.

Funding for the series was partially raised through a successful Kickstarter campaign. The soundtrack includes tracks from a number of LBQ artists and bands including Lucy Spraggan, MIRI, ME and Deboe, Greymatter, Playing House and DJ Sarah Cooper. The series bills itself as the first LBQ web series to come out of the United Kingdom.

== Synopsis ==
Theo (Miri) tends bar in a lesbian bar in Soho. While the bar is iconic a mainstream property developer wants to close the venue, forcing its owner Jill (Kerry Leigh) to launch a campaign to keep it alive. Complicating matters is Theo's relationship with her best friend Sam (Joanna Ludlow), as Theo has slept with her beautiful ex Mel (Clare Hopes).

== Cast ==
- Miri as Theo
- Clare Hopes as Mel
- Joanna Ludlow as Sam
- Kerry Leigh as Jill
- Lauren Karl as Hana
- Natasha Rebuck as Alex
- Rachael Cooksey as Jo
- Jake Graf as John
- Adwoa-Alexsis Mintah as Adi
- Sarah Lavender as Ella

== Episodes ==
- Episode 1 - 27 September 2015
- Episode 2 - 4 October 2015
- Episode 3 - 11 October 2015
- Episode 4 - 18 October 2015
- Episode 5 - 25 October 2015
- Episode 6 - 1 November 2015

== Reception ==
Diva rated the series highly and wrote that it was "a love letter from the queer community of Soho to itself and that's what makes it worth the watching."
