= Kango =

- Town
- Coat of arms

- Location in Gabon
- Coordinates: 00°09′N 10°08′E
- Country: Gabon
- Province: Estuaire Province
- Department: Komo Department
- Elevation: 9.8 ft (3 m)

Population (2013)
  - Total: 4,771

Kango is a town in the Estuaire Province of Gabon, Central Africa, lying on the Komo River and the N1 road. It has a station near the Trans-Gabon Railway, where the railway bridges the Gabon Estuary.

Kango is a small town with a population of about 4,771 according to 2013 census reports The town lies at an altitude of 3 meters above mean sea level and is known for its wildlife.

== See also ==
- Railway stations in Gabon
