= Komo (department) =

Coordinates: 00°09′N 10°08′E

- Department
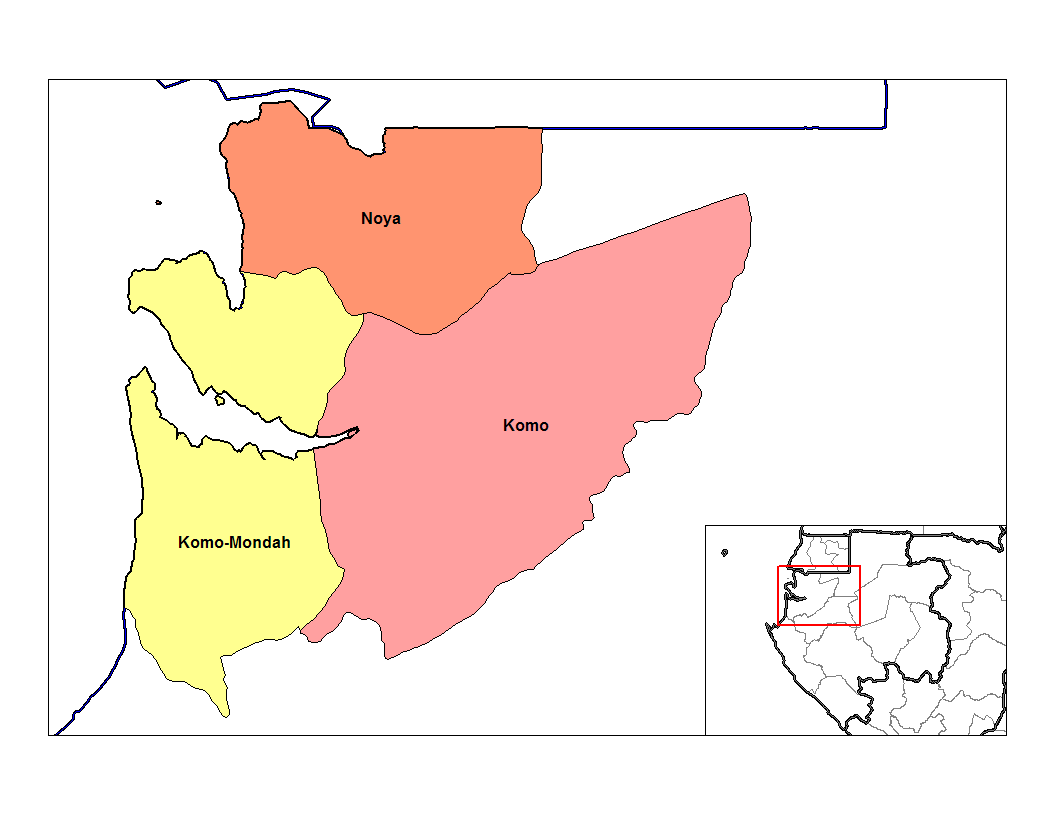
- Komo-Mondah Department in the region

Population (2013 Census)
  - Total: 17,575
- Time zone: UTC+1 (GMT +1)

Komo Department is a department of Estuaire Province in western Gabon. The capital lies at Kango. The department had a population of 17,575 in 2013.

== Towns and villages ==
- Zoulameyong
