= Minvoul =

- Location in Gabon
- Coordinates: 2°09′06″N 12°07′57″E
- Country: Gabon
- Province: Woleu-Ntem Province
- Elevation: 1,969 ft (600 m)

Minvoul is a town in Woleu-Ntem Province, Gabon.

== Location ==
It is near the border with Cameroon and is near a tributary of the Ntem River. It is served by Minvoul Airport.
