= Loango National Park =

National park in Western Gabon

- IUCN category II (national park)
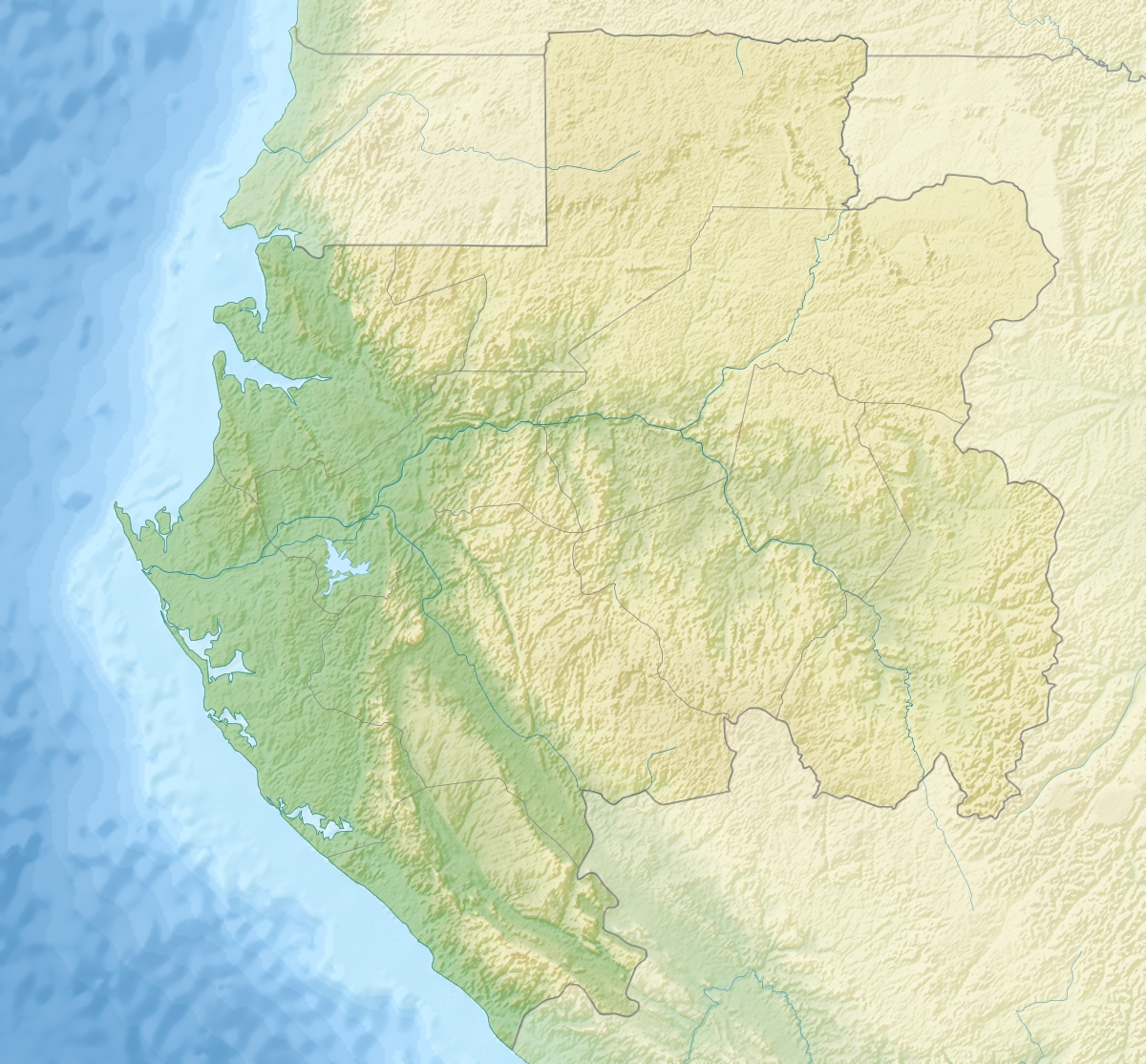
- Location within Gabon
- Location: Gabon
- Coordinates: 2°10′S 9°34′E
- Area: 1,550 km^{2} (600 sq mi)
- Established: 2002
- Governing body: National Agency for National Parks

Loango National Park (French: Parc national de Loango) is a national park in western Gabon. It protects diverse coastal habitats including part of the 220-square-kilometre (85 sq mi) Iguéla Lagoon, the only significant example of a typical western African lagoon system that is protected within a national park.

Situated between the Nkomi and Ndogo Lagoons, Loango National Park spans 1,550 km^{2} (600 sq mi) of savanna, beach, forest, and mangroves. The naturalist Mike Fay called Loango "Africa's Last Eden", and this is where Michael "Nick" Nichols from National Geographic took his pictures of surfing hippopotamuses. Both men call Loango the 'land of surfing hippos'. Loango National Park offers the opportunity to observe elephants, buffalos, hippopotamuses, gorillas, and leopards venturing onto the beaches.

After South Africa, the world's largest concentration and variety of whales and dolphins can be found right off the Loango coast. The area has over 100 kilometres (62 mi) of uninhabited coastline with humpback and killer whales.

The World Conservation Union or International Union for the Conservation of Nature and Natural Resources (IUCN) classed Loango National Park as a faunal reserve and protected area for conservation.

== History ==
The first faunal reserves in the Loango area were founded in 1956. The park was then established in 2002, along with 13 others that together comprise approximately 10% of Gabon's entire landmass. When President Omar Bongo Ondimba.

== Tourism and conservation ==
SCD (Société de Conservation de Developpement) was founded by Rombout Swanborn, a pioneering Dutch investor in "Conservation Tourism". WCS collaborates on research, park management, and educational programs. He also founded Africa's Eden, which developed the infrastructure and logistics to deliver high-end environmental tourism experiences in remote sections of Gabon (and, beginning in 2006, in São Tomé and Principe), based on the principle "Tourism pays for Conservation".

== People ==
Very few villages currently exist within the park, as most are located on the opposite bank of the Ngove Lagoon. As such, the park is nearly devoid of people and home only to an array of terrestrial, avian, and marine wildlife. While some of these animals inhabit specific ecological niches to which they have been adapting over time immemorial, others such as elephants and buffalo range across several landscapes.

The human inhabitants of the Loango area remain dependent on the natural resources that surround them for their daily needs. Today, although some Gabonese citizens have migrated toward the urban centers or taken up employment within modern industries such as oil and timber production, most individuals living in traditional villages still depend heavily upon their natural surroundings for their day-to-day needs.

Village-dwelling peoples use a slash-and-burn agricultural technique and grow several domesticated plant species including manioc, peanuts, and mustard greens. Women are responsible for most of the gardening save for the preliminary felling and clearing of trees and bushes. Men make their living by fishing or hunting. Fishermen use long nets, throw nets, gill nets, long lines, baited hooks, fish traps, and spears to catch fish and shrimp. Land crabs are caught by hand. Traditional hunting gear such as bows and arrows, spears, deadfall, and spring traps have been replaced by high-caliber rifles and shotguns. Several other food products are harvested wild in the forest, savannah, or from the beaches, such as turtle eggs.

== Images ==
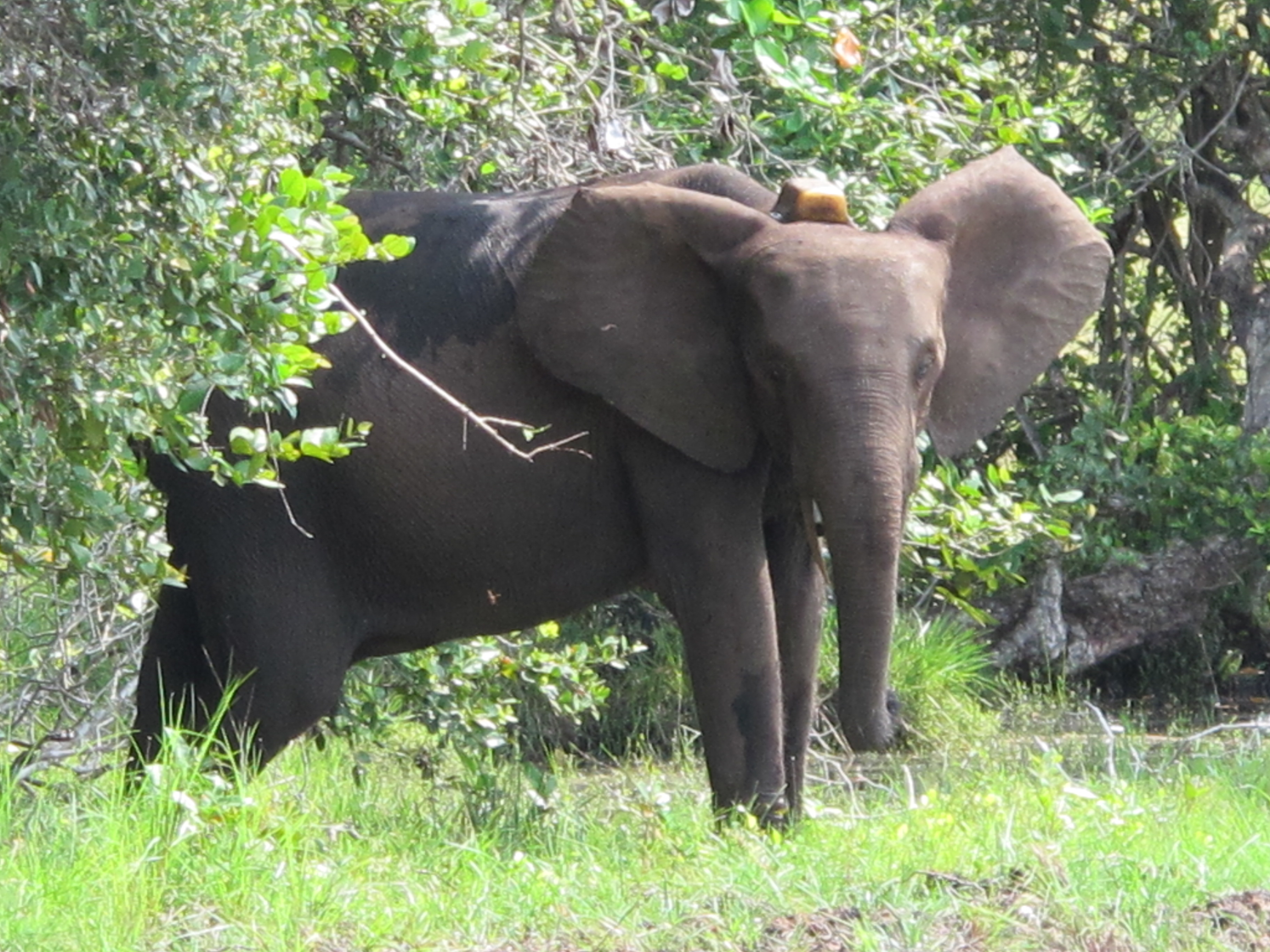
Elephant with a GPS collar

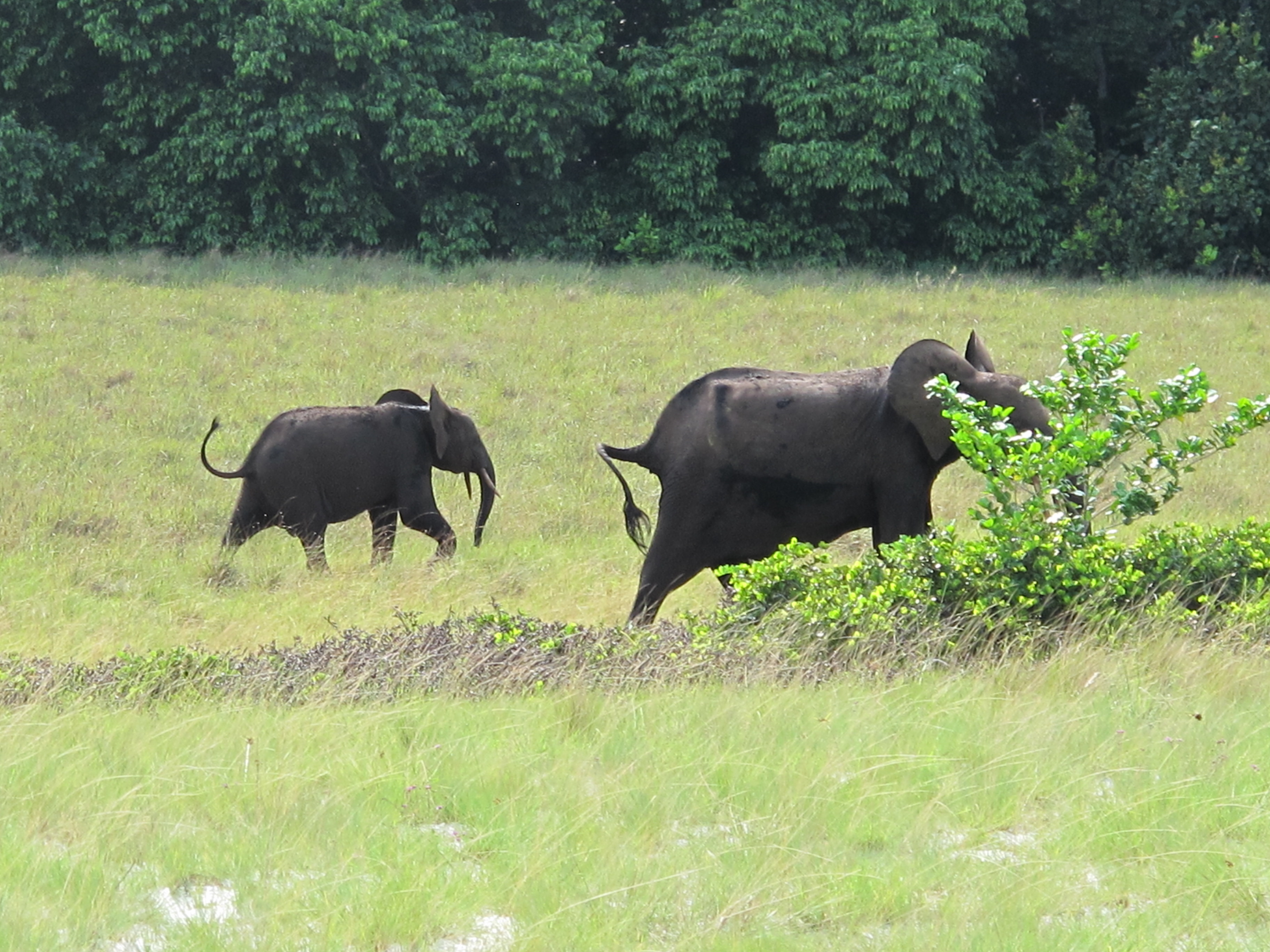
Elephant with offspring roaming

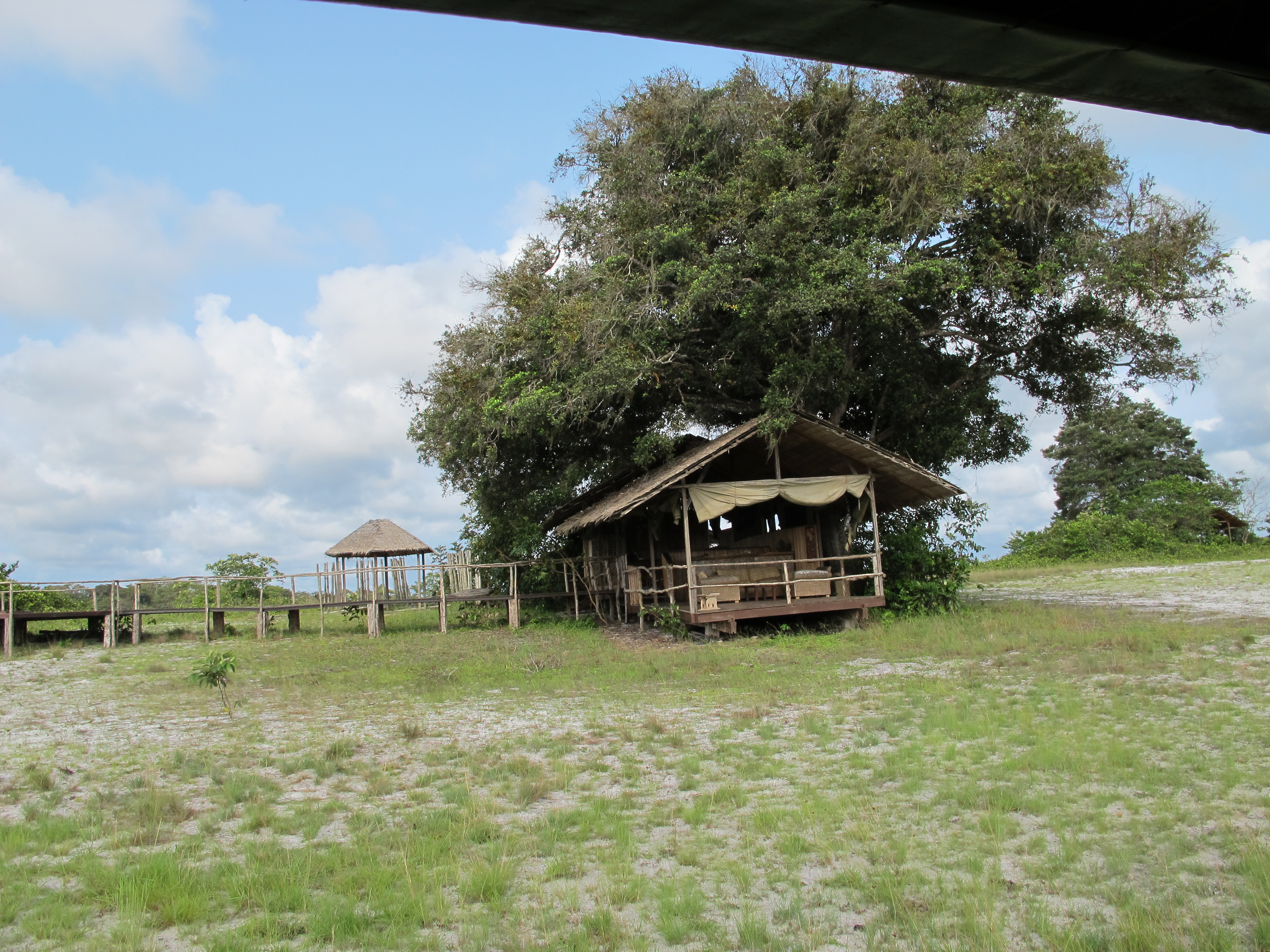
Southern Park Camp Site bar with a view

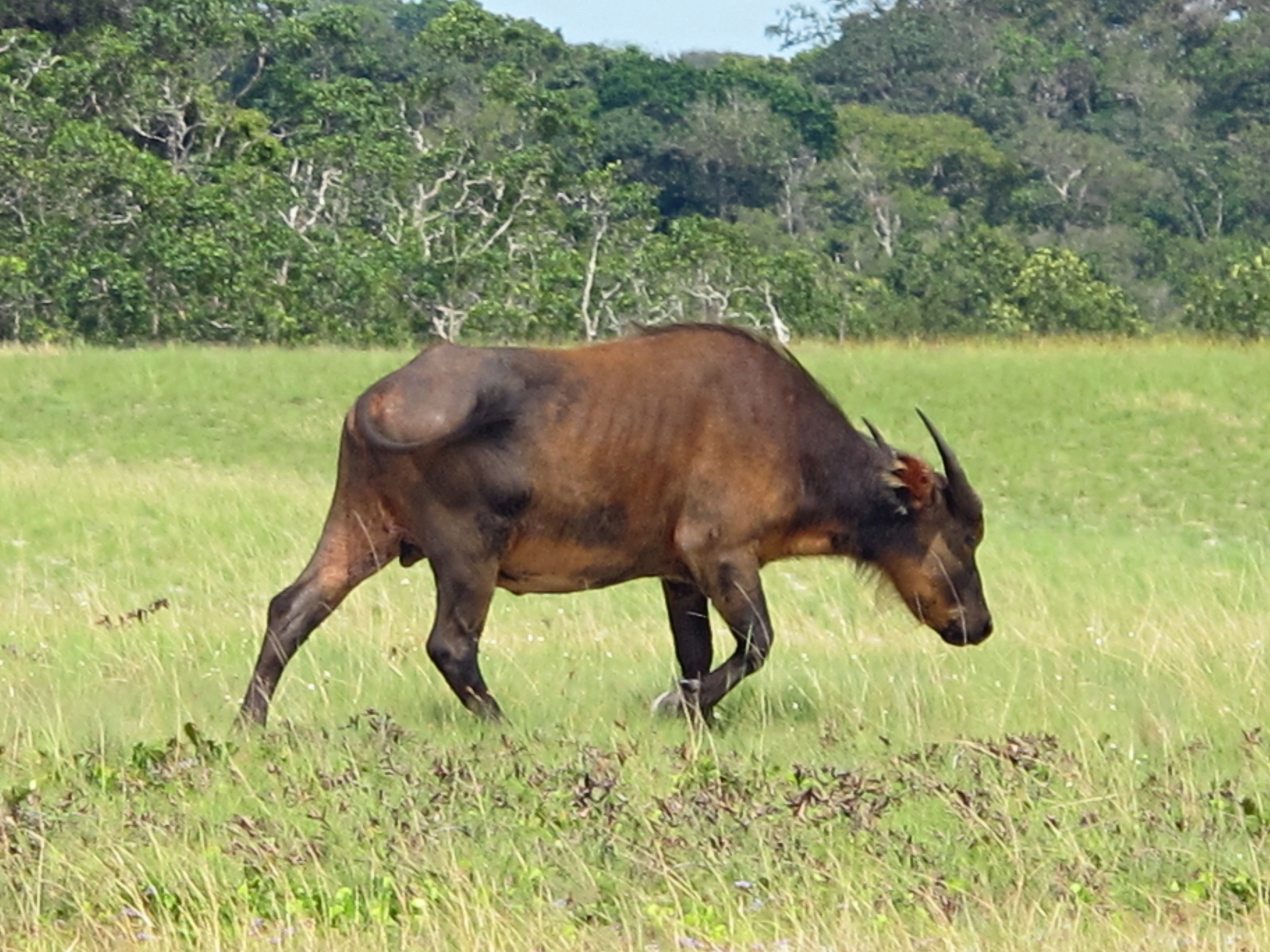
Single Wild Buffalo within the park roaming

Southern Park Camping Ground looking towards Ocean

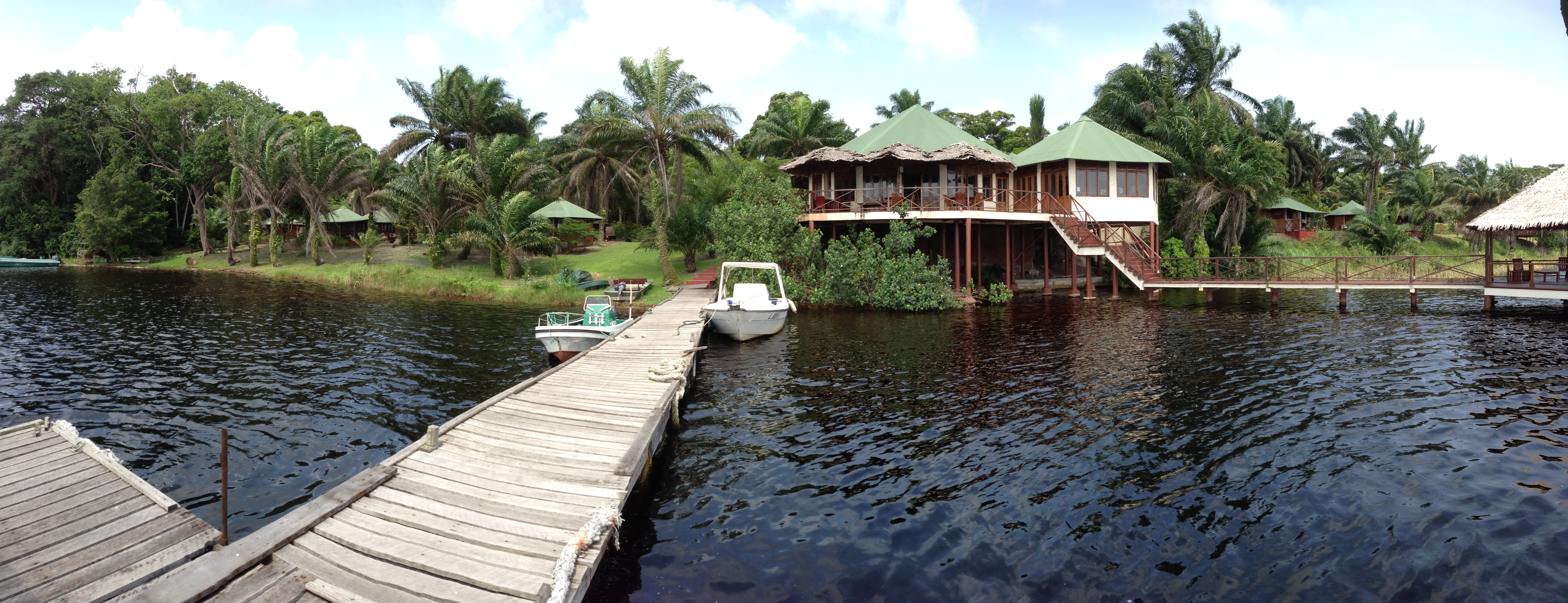
View of lodge from water
