= Bitam =

- Coat of arms

- Location in Gabon
- Coordinates: 02°05′00″N 11°29′00″E
- Country: Gabon
- Province: Woleu-Ntem Province
- Department: Ntem Department

Population (2013)
  - Total: 27,923

Bitam is a town in northern Gabon on the N2 road on the border with Cameroon. As of the 2013 census, its population is 27,923.

It is home to a large market and an airport.

A small Jewish community composed of former Christians has developed in Bitam. The community practices Jewish customs, but does not yet have a synagogue.

== Climate ==
Climate data for Bitam (1961–1990 normals, extremes 1946–present)
Month	Jan	Feb	Mar	Apr	May	Jun	Jul	Aug	Sep	Oct	Nov	Dec	Year
Record high °C (°F)	38.5 (101.3)	40.5 (104.9)	37.0 (98.6)	38.0 (100.4)	38.4 (101.1)	38.5 (101.3)	32.3 (90.1)	38.0 (100.4)	33.1 (91.6)	36.0 (96.8)	35.5 (95.9)	35.0 (95.0)	40.5 (104.9)
Mean daily maximum °C (°F)	28.4 (83.1)	30.3 (86.5)	30.4 (86.7)	30.3 (86.5)	29.6 (85.3)	28.3 (82.9)	26.9 (80.4)	26.9 (80.4)	28.4 (83.1)	28.7 (83.7)	28.8 (83.8)	28.7 (83.7)	28.8 (83.8)
Daily mean °C (°F)	24.2 (75.6)	25.2 (77.4)	25.2 (77.4)	25.2 (77.4)	24.9 (76.8)	24.3 (75.7)	23.4 (74.1)	23.2 (73.8)	24.1 (75.4)	24.3 (75.7)	24.3 (75.7)	24.3 (75.7)	24.4 (75.9)
Mean daily minimum °C (°F)	20.0 (68.0)	20.1 (68.2)	20.0 (68.0)	20.1 (68.2)	20.2 (68.4)	20.2 (68.4)	19.9 (67.8)	19.4 (66.9)	19.8 (67.6)	19.8 (67.6)	19.7 (67.5)	19.9 (67.8)	19.9 (67.8)
Record low °C (°F)	14.0 (57.2)	13.2 (55.8)	12.0 (53.6)	14.4 (57.9)	16.0 (60.8)	15.5 (59.9)	13.5 (56.3)	14.8 (58.6)	16.2 (61.2)	17.0 (62.6)	13.5 (56.3)	14.5 (58.1)	12.0 (53.6)
Average precipitation mm (inches)	42.5 (1.67)	72.6 (2.86)	175.3 (6.90)	119.2 (4.69)	207.2 (8.16)	131.8 (5.19)	48.0 (1.89)	63.9 (2.52)	228.6 (9.00)	282.2 (11.11)	175.2 (6.90)	59.7 (2.35)	1,606.2 (63.24)
Average rainy days	3.8	6.8	12.5	14.4	16.1	11.1	6.4	7.5	17.8	21.3	14.8	6.1	138.6
Average relative humidity (%)	80	78	79	81	82	83	85	84	82	83	83	83	82
Mean monthly sunshine hours	119.8	120.9	127.9	136.9	135.9	111.0	84.0	66.3	93.0	113.8	119.9	116.6	1,346
Percentage possible sunshine	32	36	34	38	36	31	22	18	26	31	34	32	31
Source 1: NOAA
Source 2: Meteo Climat (extremes)
