= Owendo =

Owendo Ovendo
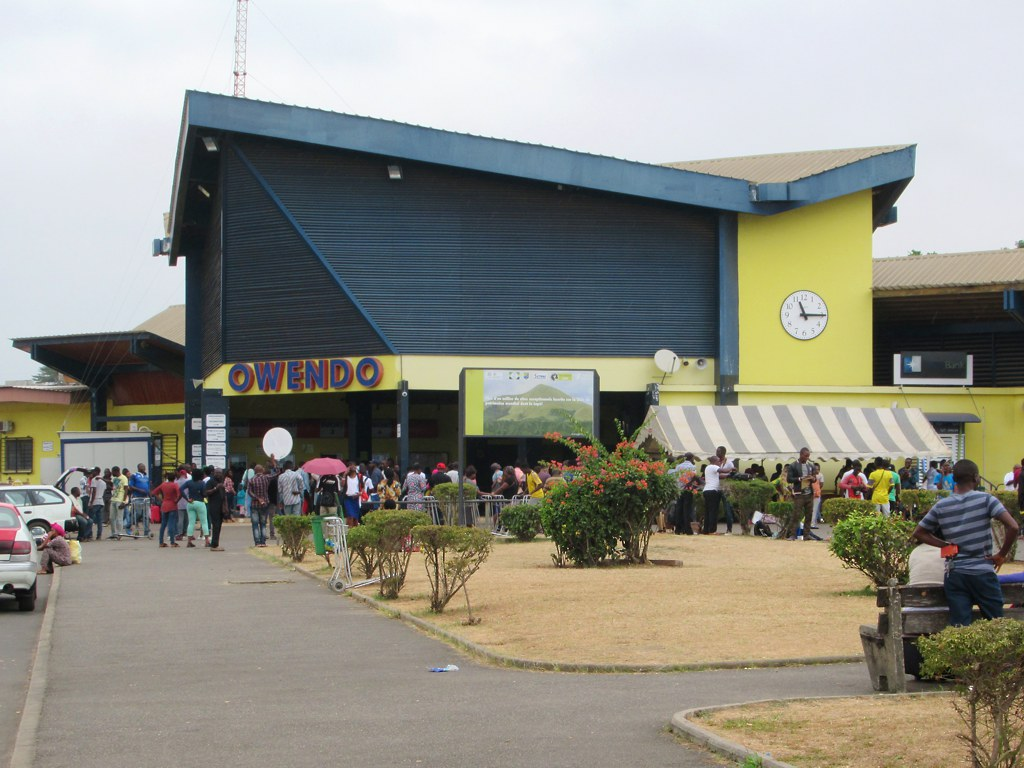

- Location in Gabon
- Coordinates: 00°17′00″N 09°30′00″E
- Country: Gabon
- Province: Estuaire Province

Population (2013 Census)
  - Total: 79,300

Owendo is a port city in Gabon, forming a south western suburb of Libreville.

== History ==
In 1978, the Trans-Gabon Railway was connected to the city.

In 2023, Fortescue signed a deal to mine iron ore at Belinga using road and rail to reach the port of Owendo. Initially about 2m tonnes of ore would be carried.

== Industry ==
Owendo has a cement works.

== Port ==
The Port of Owendo is Gabon's principal seaport, handling containers, timber, bulk minerals and general cargo. In 2017, the New Owendo International Port (NOIP) was inaugurated as part of the Nkok Special Economic Zone programme. Built in about 18 months for an investment of around US$300 million, its multipurpose terminal has a 420-metre quay and two berths dredged to 13 metres to accommodate Panamax vessels, with an annual handling capacity of roughly 130,000 TEU; it was developed through a partnership between Bolloré Transport & Logistics and the Olam-backed GSEZ Ports. Owendo also has a dedicated mineral port used chiefly for the export of manganese.

== See also ==
- List of deep water ports
- Cement in Africa
