= Campo River =

Border river in Cameroon, Equatorial Guinea, and Gabon

Coordinates: 2°21′0″N 9°49′0″E

Designations

Ramsar Wetland
- Official name: Río Ntem o Campo
- Designated: 2 June 2003
- Reference no.: 1310

Ramsar Wetland
- Official name: Partie Camerounaise du Fleuve Ntem
- Designated: 5 June 2012
- Reference no.: 2067

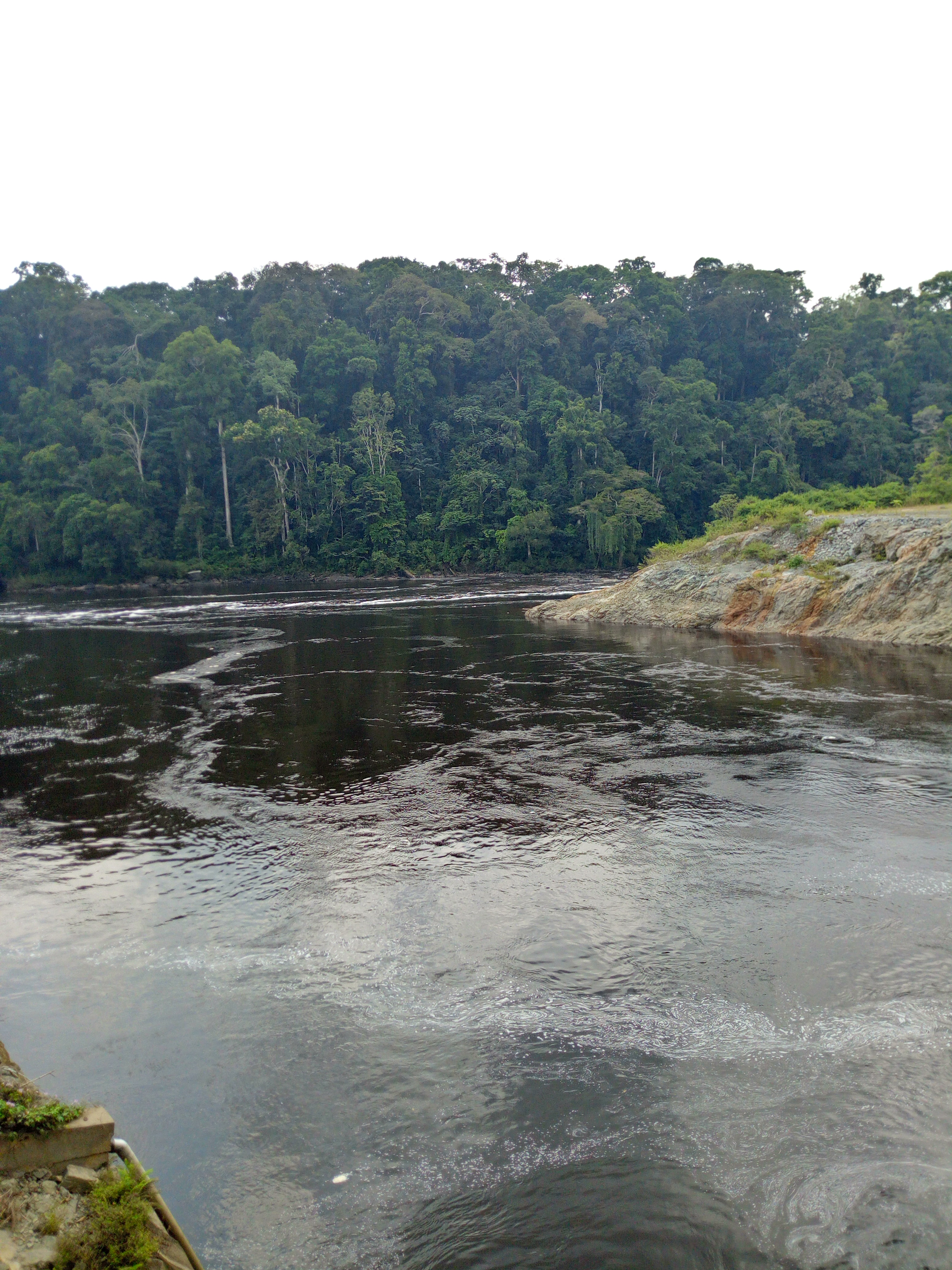
Ntem River, Cameroon

The Campo (Spanish: Río Campo, French: Rivière Ntem) or Ntem River is a border river in Cameroon, mainland Equatorial Guinea and Gabon. It rises in Gabon, and flows into the Atlantic Ocean in Cameroon in the Bight of Biafra.

== Towns ==
- Campo
- Minvoul, Gabon

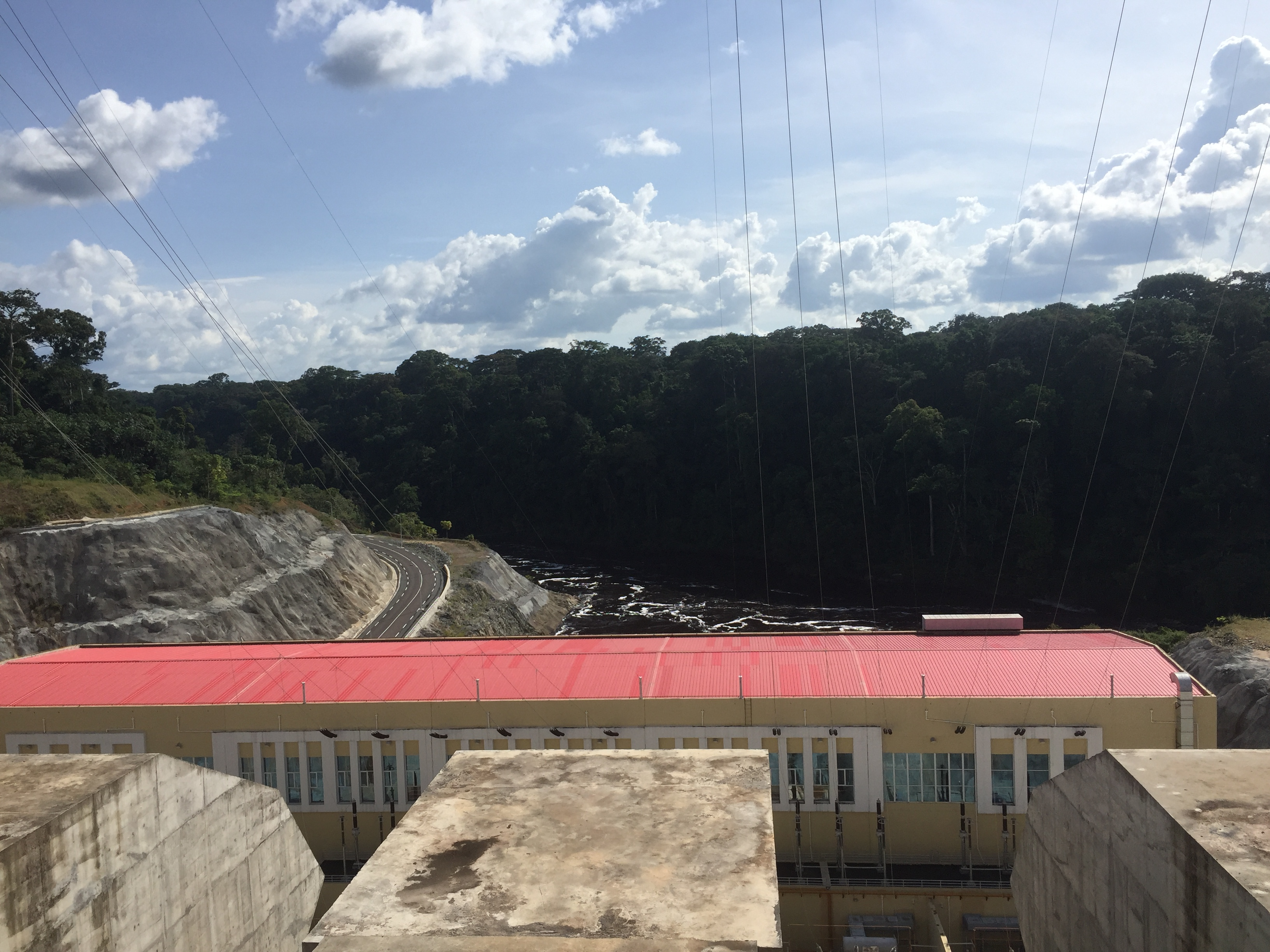
Dam on Ntem River

== See also ==
- Communes of Cameroon
