= Gabon Estuary =

Estuary in western Gabon

Coordinates: 0.24°N 9.51°E

The Gabon River or Gabon Estuary is a short wide estuary in the western Gabon. The capital Libreville has a large port on the north bank of the estuary which collects water from the Komo River and River Ebe. The estuary empties into the Gulf of Guinea. The estuary is locally known as the Estuaire du Gabon.

Map showing the rivers of Gabon
