= Setté Cama =

Village in Gabon

- Location in Gabon
- Coordinates: 2°32′04″S 9°46′12″E
- Country: Gabon
- Province: Ngounié Province

Setté Cama is a village in Gabon, lying on the peninsula between the Ndogo Lagoon and the Atlantic Ocean. In the sixteenth century, it was a major European colonial sea port trading in timber and ivory. Long declined, it is now home to a museum, the Setté Cama Hunting Area and the Setté Cama Airport. Setté Cama lies just south of Loango National Park.
