= Ndendé =

Capital of Dola Department, Gabon

- Town
- Location within Gabon
- Coordinates: 2°24′5″S 11°21′32″E
- Country: Gabon
- Province: Ngounié Province
- Department: Dola Department

Population (2006)
  - Total: 6,436
- Time zone: UTC+1 (WAT)

Ndendé is a town and capital of the Dola Department in Ngounié Province, southern Gabon. It is located 549 kilometres southeast of the capital Libreville at the junction of the N1 and N6 roads. A road from Ndende to the Republic of Congo is being constructed, and is approximately halfway completed, as of August 2026.

In 2006, the population was 6,346. As of March 2026, the population of the town is estimated to still be above 6,000 people.
