= N1 road (Gabon) =

Road in Gabon

Location
- Country: Gabon

Highway system
- Transport in Gabon

The N1 road of Gabon is a 520-km road that runs from Libreville to Moumba that takes approximately 12 hours to drive. The portion of the road from Ndendé to the border with Congo-Brazzaville is traveled infrequently due to the instability in the latter country. However, it usually takes approximately two hours to reach the border.

The N1 is paved until Ndendé. Upon exiting that city, it becomes a dirt road. It is difficult to travel during the rainy season (February through May) due to large puddles and deep mud.

A bush taxi (pick-up truck used as the primary mode of transportation in Gabon) may be taken from Libreville to Tchibanga for approximately 20,000 Central African francs.
