= Ndogo Lagoon =

Lagoon in Gabon

Coordinates: 2°35′S 10°00′E

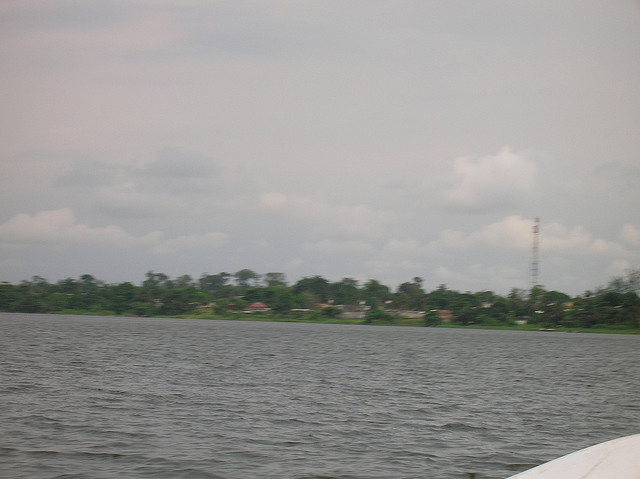
The Ndougou lagoon in Gamba

The Ndogo Lagoon is the largest lagoon in Gabon, located in the southwestern part of the country. It has a surface area of 487 square kilometres (188 sq mi). It runs parallel to the Atlantic coast for about 40 kilometres (25 mi), with an outlet to the sea at the northwest. Because of its small outlet compared to its length, the lagoon's water is not very saline, with a salinity below 1 g/L. The Ndogo River flows into the lagoon.

Setté Cama and Gamba are two known places that lie on its banks. The Ndogo Lagoon has about 350 islands. Sport fishing is popular in the area, and close to the mouth of the lagoon are fish including barracuda, carrangue, redfish, captaine, tuna, and tarpon.
