= Trans-Gabon Railway =

Railway line in Gabon

Coordinates: 1°37′21.92″S 13°29′21.56″E

- Map of the Trans-Gabon Railway line

Overview
- Native name: Chemin de fer transgabonais
- Status: Active
- Termini: Libreville; Franceville
- Stations: 23

Service
- System: Heavy rail

History
- Opened: 1987

Technical
- Line length: 669 km (416 mi)
- Track gauge: 1,435 mm (4 ft 8 1/2 in) standard gauge

The Trans-Gabon Railway (French: Transgabonais) is the only railway in Gabon. It runs some 648 km (about 670 km including yards and branches) eastward from the port of Owendo, on the outskirts of the capital Libreville, to Franceville in the south-east of the country, serving 23 intermediate stations, the most important of which are Ndjolé, Lopé, Booué, Lastoursville and Moanda. It is built to standard gauge (1,435 mm) as a single, unelectrified track and is operated with diesel locomotives.

Conceived as a linchpin of Omar Bongo's post-independence modernisation drive, the line was financed largely from Gabon's 1970s oil windfall, supplemented by French, West German and later British and Italian capital after the World Bank declined to fund the project on economic grounds. Construction began in October 1974; the first section, Owendo–Ndjolé, was opened in 1978, and the line reached Franceville on 30 December 1986. The cost of roughly US$1.65 billion substantially exceeded early estimates and strained Gabonese public finances for more than a decade.

The railway is operated under a long-term concession by the Société d'Exploitation du Transgabonais (SETRAG), a subsidiary of the manganese producer Compagnie minière de l'Ogooué (COMILOG), which is itself majority-owned by the French mining and metallurgical group Eramet. Manganese ore shipped from the Moanda mine to Owendo for export accounts for the overwhelming majority of freight traffic; the line also moves okoumé and other tropical timber, uranium ore concentrates from the former Mounana mine area, general freight and, under a public-service obligation, passengers. In 2022 the line carried approximately 248,000 passengers and 10.9 million tonnes of freight.

== Background ==
A railway crossing Gabon was first mooted during the colonial period, with proposals advanced as early as 1885 and periodically revived during French Equatorial African rule. None of these ideas were executed, and until the 1970s, Gabon possessed no railway of its own, relying instead on the Ogooué River and on the Congo–Ocean Railway in neighbouring Moyen-Congo (later the Republic of the Congo) for bulk exports.

From the 1950s onwards, the manganese deposits at Moanda were exploited by COMILOG, founded in 1953 with U.S. Steel as a significant shareholder. Lacking rail access inside Gabon, the company constructed the 76 km (47 mi) COMILOG Cableway, which was among the longest aerial ropeways in the world at the time of its commissioning in 1962. It linked Moanda with the railhead at Mbinda in Moyen-Congo, where ore was forwarded by the Congo–Ocean Railway to Pointe-Noire for export. Reliance on a foreign corridor for the country's principal mineral export was politically unsatisfactory and became a central argument for building a Gabonese railway.

Feasibility studies were undertaken in 1968 under President Léon M'ba and his successor Omar Bongo. The project was formally launched by Bongo at Owendo on 30 December 1973 following the October 1973 quadrupling of world oil prices, which transformed Gabon's public finances and furnished the state with the means to pursue a showpiece infrastructure project without multilateral support. The World Bank had refused in 1973 to co-finance the scheme on the grounds that it was not economically viable, a judgement that would be echoed by subsequent critics.

== Planning and financing ==
The decision to build the railway was, in Bongo's own terms, political as much as economic: addressing the need to evacuate Moanda's manganese by a national route, to open up the thinly populated eastern provinces, and to reduce Gabonese dependence on an external corridor running through the Republic of the Congo. According to political scientist Douglas Yates, whose study "The Rentier State in Africa" remains the standard academic treatment of Gabon's oil-era political economy, the Transgabonais showcased both the developmental ambition and the patrimonial logic of the Bongo regime, with the route selected to pass through the president's native Haut-Ogooué region.

Originally, the line was to terminate at Makokou in the north-east, from where a branch line was to serve the Bélinga iron-ore deposits. The alignment was subsequently redrawn to run south-east to Franceville via Moanda in order to capture the manganese traffic then carried by the COMILOG Cableway; when the railway reached Moanda in the mid-1980s, the cableway was closed.

The choice of standard gauge (1,435 mm) rather than one of the narrow gauges common in colonial-era African railways reflected the fact that the line was conceived and built in the era of heavy earth-moving machinery, so the traditional cost savings of narrow gauge had become marginal, and the use of standard-gauge track permitted the procurement of off-the-shelf European and American rolling stock.

Financing was assembled from multiple different sources. Besides direct expenditure from the Gabonese oil budget, loans and aid were provided by France, West Germany and several international organisations. In 1979 and the early 1980s, as cost overruns mounted, additional financing was provided by a British-led consortium following the discovery of commercially significant uranium deposits; the Thatcher government saw strategic value in underwriting continued work, and British expatriate personnel and contractors – including Taylor Woodrow and staff seconded from Wimpey International – joined the site. Around May 1983, a new funding and management vehicle, CCI Eurotrag, grouping British, Italian and West German interests, took over responsibility for the eastern sections of the project.

== Construction ==
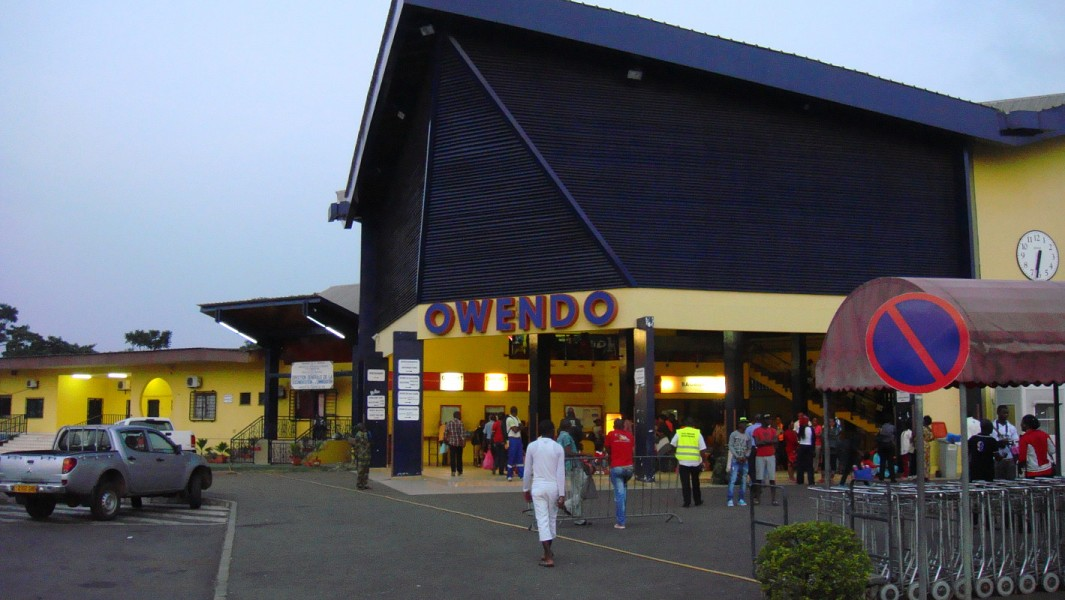
Owendo Station (2023)

Civil works began in October 1974. The civil-engineering consortium drew in Impregilo and Astaldi from Italy, Philipp Holzmann from West Germany, and the French companies Constructions et Entreprises Industrielles (CEI) and Entreprise de Construction Franco-Africaine (ECFA). At the peak of construction in the early 1980s, some 3,400 Gabonese workers and 400 expatriate specialists were deployed alongside more than 120 bulldozers, 450 heavy trucks and a purpose-built track-laying machine nicknamed "the dinosaur", carving a 90-metre-wide right of way through primary equatorial rainforest.

According to figures compiled by the engineering firm Evolutio, which archives the participation of Italian contractors in the project, the works ultimately involved around 45 million m³ of earthworks, 758 km of track laid (including yards, sidings and branches), 19 stations and 29 iron- and reinforced-concrete railway bridges with a combined length of around 4,000 m. The most significant engineering structures are the Juckville Tunnel, the viaduct across the Abanga swamp between Ndjolé and Booué, and the combined bridge over the confluence of the Ogooué and Ivindo rivers near Booué; the line crosses the Ogooué five times in all, at Franceville, at Ndjolé, three times near Booué and, on a girder bridge, east of Lastoursville.

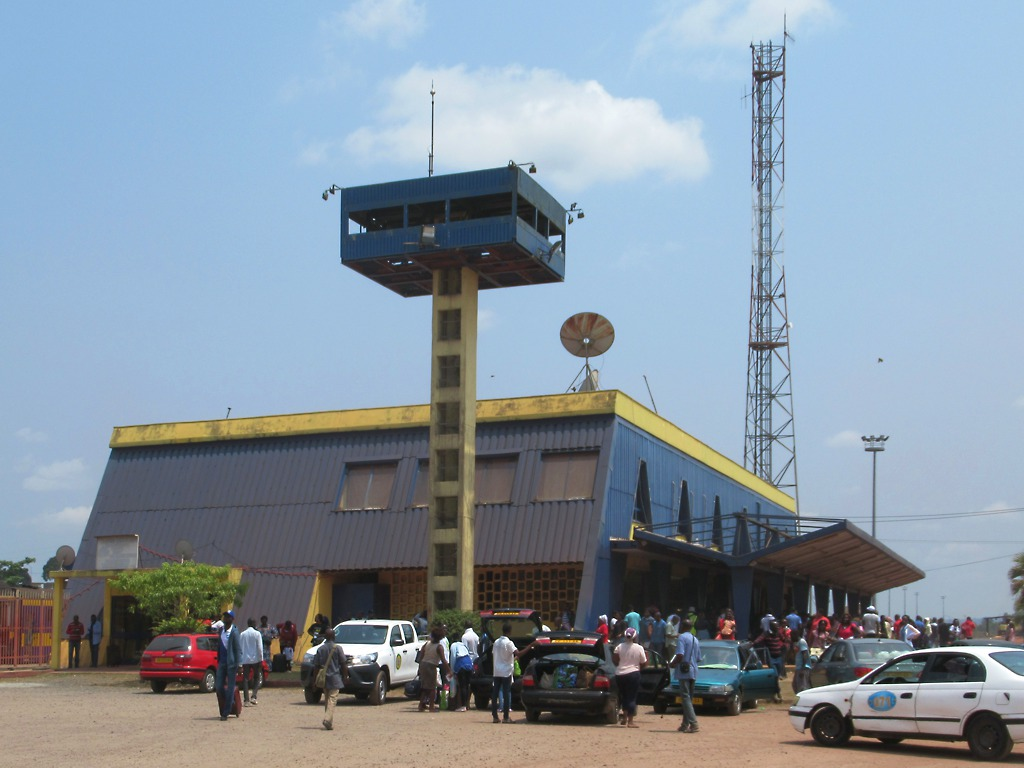
Franceville Station (2018)

The construction period was marked by chronic cost overruns that came close to bankrupting the state, particularly after the 1980s slide in oil prices eroded Gabon's revenues. A commemorative history of the first phase, L'Épopée du Transgabonais: Owendo–Booué 1974–1983, was published by Berger-Levrault in 1984 in honour of President Bongo and records the participation of the Eurotrag consortium in detail.

The first section, Owendo–Ndjolé (about 181 km), was opened to traffic in 1978 (the Encyclopædia Britannica gives 1979 for the opening ceremony). The Ndjolé–Booué section was inaugurated on 18 January 1983 by President Bongo in the company of French President François Mitterrand. The Booué–Franceville section, some 357 km long, was completed and opened on 30 December 1986 in the presence of French Prime Minister Jacques Chirac; service to Franceville began in early 1987.

== Route and infrastructure ==
=== Route description ===
The railway runs roughly south-east from Owendo, the mineral port on the Gabon Estuary, just south of Libreville. West of Ndjolé, the alignment follows the lower Ogooué valley; at and beyond Ndjolé it ascends towards the interior plateau, crossing the Abanga swamp on a major viaduct and traversing the broken relief of the Monts de Cristal foothills. Between Booué and Lastoursville the line passes through the UNESCO-listed Ecosystem and Relict Cultural Landscape of Lopé-Okanda, crossing the Ogooué and the Ivindo in quick succession near their confluence. From Lastoursville the route continues via Moanda, the terminus of the Moanda-mine branch, to the passenger terminus at Franceville on the Ogooué.

The main line comprises the 648 km Owendo–Franceville corridor, with a total network of approximately 710 km, including the freight-only spur serving COMILOG's Moanda facilities and associated sidings at Owendo. Twenty-three stations are served on the main line, with an average spacing of roughly 40 km.

=== Engineering and technical parameters ===
The Transgabonais is a single-track, standard-gauge railway with no electrification; traction is provided by main-line diesel-electric locomotives. The maximum design gradient is 8 ‰ and the line speed 80 km/h, though sustained operation is slower on the mountainous central sections and over the unstable soils around Ndjolé. The original permanent way used 50 kg/m flat-bottomed rail on wooden sleepers; these are being progressively replaced with 60 kg/m rail on twin-block concrete sleepers as part of the current modernisation programme.

Signalling and telecommunications were originally provided by conventional trackside equipment. In 2003, Hughes Network Systems installed a satellite-based telephony system covering all stations, replacing a deteriorating line-side microwave network. Since 2015, SETRAG has undertaken further investment in signalling, telecommunications and track-condition monitoring, including a 2020s contract with ENSCO for on-board track-geometry measurement.

=== Stations ===
The principal stations, west to east, are: Owendo (the western terminus and port), N'Toum, Ndjolé, Lopé (gateway to Lopé National Park), Booué, Lastoursville, Moanda (the freight railhead for COMILOG) and Franceville (the eastern terminus).

== Operations ==
=== Operating history ===
From the opening of the first section in 1978, the railway was operated by a state-owned enterprise, the Office du Chemin de Fer Transgabonais (OCTRA). OCTRA remained the sole operator throughout the 1980s and 1990s, but the line was chronically unprofitable and in 1999, the government of Gabon placed the railway under a privatised concession. The initial concessionaire was a consortium led by the state forestry company Société nationale des bois du Gabon (SNBG) in partnership with the Belgian firm Transurb.

On 1 September 2005, the concession was re-granted, for a period of 30 years, to the newly formed Société d'Exploitation du Transgabonais (SETRAG), in which COMILOG (itself majority-owned by Eramet) held the controlling stake. SETRAG assumed responsibility for infrastructure maintenance from 2015 onward, in conjunction with its Programme de Remise à Niveau (see below). In 2021 the concession was extended and restructured: the infrastructure fund Meridiam acquired a 40 % interest, with Eramet/COMILOG retaining 51 % and the Gabonese state holding the remaining 9 %.

=== Services ===
Two passenger services are advertised between Owendo and Franceville: the Train Express Trans-Ogooué (formerly the Ntsa Express), which stops only at principal stations, and the all-stations Train Omnibus L'Équateur. Services normally operate overnight in both directions, typically four days a week, with three classes plus a restaurant car on express services. The passenger offering is provided under a public-service obligation imposed by the concession; passenger revenue has historically accounted for only about 12 % of the operator's turnover, with freight – and principally manganese – furnishing the remainder.

Freight services are built around dedicated manganese-ore trains running between Moanda and Owendo, supplemented by general-freight and timber services. In the early 2020s, SETRAG operated approximately 17 freight trains per week, with manganese trains of up to 10,000 tonnes and, in multiple-unit formation, up to 11,000 tonnes handled on the ruling 8 ‰ grade.

=== Traffic ===
Documented traffic figures indicate the growth of the line since opening. In 1996 – the first year for which broadly cited data is available – the railway carried approximately 3 million tonnes of freight and 190,000 passengers. In 2020, it carried approximately 330,000 passengers and nearly 9 million tonnes of freight, including around 90 % of Gabonese manganese production. In 2022, the corresponding figures were approximately 248,000 passengers and 10.9 million tonnes of freight. The Programme de Remise à Niveau 2 (PRN2) is designed to raise permitted annual freight capacity from 12 Mt to 19 Mt.

== Rolling stock ==
As of the early 2020s, SETRAG's fleet comprised 34 main-line diesel locomotives, approximately 723 freight wagons (including mineral wagons for manganese) and 41 passenger coaches, together with approximately 153 road vehicles and an assorted construction plant.

Main-line traction has progressively been transferred to Chinese diesel-electric locomotives supplied by CRRC Ziyang, with four batches totalling 22 units delivered between 2010 and 2022. The most recent contract, signed in early 2022, covered six DF8B heavy-haul diesels together with ten years of maintenance; CRRC Ziyang states that in three-locomotive multiple-unit operation the type can haul continuous trailing loads of up to 11,000 t on an 8.3 ‰ gradient, meeting the requirements for heavy manganese services. Earlier deliveries included two EMD JT42CWR locomotives shipped in September 2011 with an option for four more and ten passenger coaches.

Passenger rolling stock is of mixed origin. Express services run in air-conditioned carriages built in Germany in 2017, while all-stations trains combine Korean-built coaches delivered in 2011 with refurbished 1960s vehicles of French origin.

== Modernisation (Programme de Remise à Niveau) ==
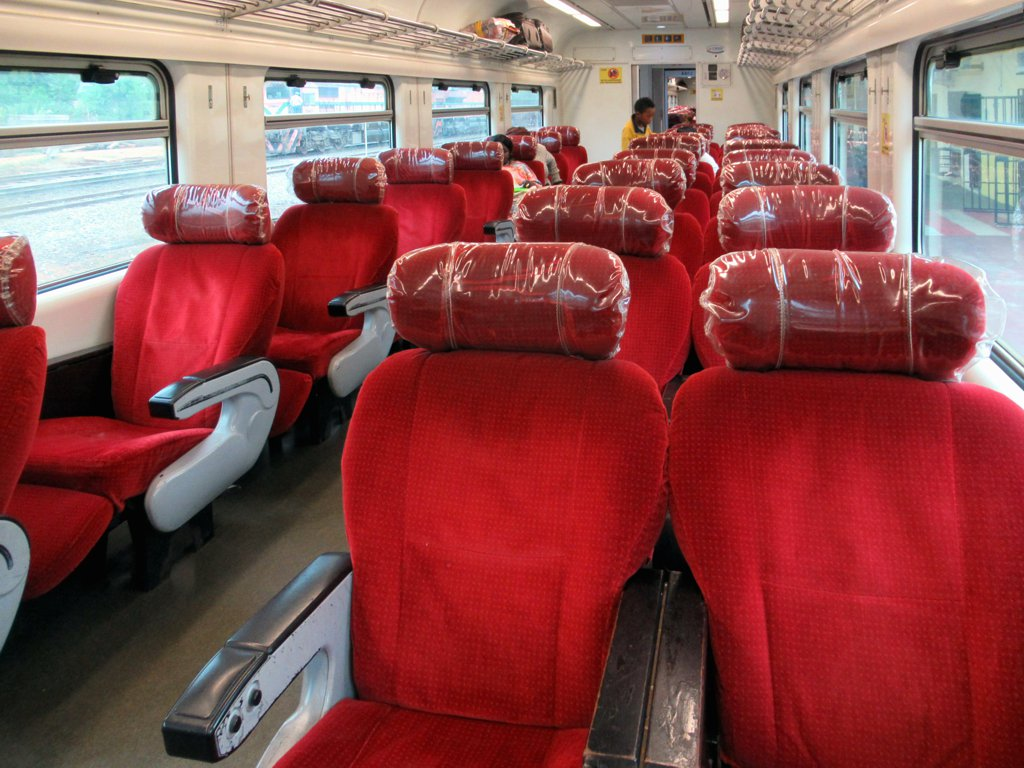
The new first class compartments on the train (2018)

By the mid-2010s, the permanent way had deteriorated to the point that effective capacity was estimated to have fallen by roughly half from design values, with train speeds restricted on long sections of the line and frequent derailments occurring on unstable cuttings and embankments between Owendo and Ndjolé.

=== Phase 1 (PRN1) ===
In 2015, SETRAG and the Gabonese state agreed on an initial eight-year Programme de Remise à Niveau (PRN1) valued at approximately €315 million (around US$362 million), aimed at restoring the line to its original capacity. The project was financed jointly by SETRAG and the Gabonese government, with loans from the International Finance Corporation (IFC) and its French counterpart Proparco, including a €32.5 million Proparco loan signed on 26 June 2016. The works replaced several hundred kilometres of worn rail, renewed sleepers over critical sections, stabilised unstable cuttings and rehabilitated bridges, stations and signalling; the IFC classified it as an environmental and social "Category A" project, in part because of the line's passage through Lopé National Park and along designated Ramsar wetlands.

=== Phase 2 (PRN2) ===
In 2021, SETRAG and the Gabonese government agreed to go beyond PRN1 with an enlarged PRN2 capital-expenditure programme designed to raise permitted freight capacity from 12 to 19 million tonnes per year. In the same year, Meridiam was admitted as a shareholder of SETRAG, bringing additional financing and project-management capacity.

In September 2024, the government and SETRAG signed a contract for the next phase of PRN2, covering the 200 km easternmost section from Milolé to Franceville together with a 30 km central section from Ndjolé to Alembé, for a total cost of approximately CFA 359 billion (€545 million or about US$580 million), of which CFA 130 billion was to be contributed by the state and the balance by SETRAG with the support of the IFC and other international lenders. On these sections, the existing 50 kg/m rail on wooden sleepers is to be replaced with 60 kg/m rail on twin-block concrete sleepers; works are expected to take three to four years.

Further funding was confirmed on 24 November 2025 during an official visit to Gabon by French President Emmanuel Macron, when the Agence Française de Développement committed a €173 million sovereign loan and the European Union a €30 million grant in support of the modernisation programme, under the EU's Global Gateway initiative. The stated aim of the programme is to raise the corridor's capacity to 16 daily train paths (eight per direction), to improve the reliability and safety of passenger services, and to upgrade critical structures and unstable sections.

== Economic and political significance ==
The Transgabonais has been characterised by successive commentators as both the physical spine of Gabon's economy and the most prominent symbol of the political economy of the Bongo era. Political scientist Douglas Yates argues that the railway exemplifies the rentier state logic of Gabonese development during the oil boom of 1975–1985: a showpiece infrastructure that was commercially unviable on its own terms but politically indispensable, cementing the Bongo regime's internal patronage networks and its external alignment with French capital. In an interview with Agence France-Presse, Yates observed that "since its creation, the Transgabonais has been closely linked to France and its interests".

Defenders of the project point to its indispensable role in the diversification and modernisation of the Gabonese economy. With the closure of the COMILOG Cableway on completion of the railway in 1986, the Transgabonais became the sole rail outlet for Moanda manganese, underwriting the growth of Gabon as one of the world's principal sources of the ore. According to Eramet, Gabon is the world's fourth-largest producer of manganese ore and the Transgabonais is "the backbone of national economic development". Gabonese economist Mays Mouissi, interviewed by AFP, has observed that "without manganese, this train could not exist", underlining the extent to which the railway and the Moanda mine are mutually dependent.

The railway also functions as a political and social artery. The train is widely known in Gabon as the "train Bongo" in recognition of the late president's role in its realisation. With the parallel national road (part of the RN1/RN3 network) in poor condition in many places, the Transgabonais is by a considerable margin the country's most important overland link between Libreville and the interior, and is used each year by hundreds of thousands of passengers for whom few alternatives exist.

== Environmental impact ==
Because the alignment was driven largely through primary equatorial forest, the Transgabonais has long been identified as an important vector of deforestation and forest fragmentation. The line passes through one UNESCO World Heritage Site (Lopé-Okanda) and three Ramsar wetlands – the Bas-Ogooué, the Rapides de Mboungou Badouma et de Doumé, and the Chutes et Rapides sur l'Ivindo – all of which the railway crosses. The MIGA environmental assessment for the PRN2 programme notes that "critical habitat" is triggered along parts of the corridor owing to the presence of critically endangered and endangered species and of restricted-range taxa, and that timber-feeder tracks developed around the rail corridor have extended the zone of anthropogenic disturbance well beyond the right of way.

The Transgabonais is also frequently cited in French-language technical literature as a driver of secondary deforestation, since the network of forestry access roads necessary both for line maintenance and for the extraction of timber feeds onto the railway in a "fish-bone" pattern cut through intact forest. The extension of rail transport inland has also been linked to the commercial exploitation of dense heartwood species that were previously uneconomic to move because they could not be floated down the Ogooué.

Under SETRAG's current concession, environmental and social performance is governed by an Environmental and Social Management Plan and a Biodiversity Action Plan approved by the IFC and Proparco, under which the operator has pursued a "Zero Collision" programme with local communities, resettlement measures for informal settlers along the track, the controlled incineration of contaminated wooden sleepers, and specific measures to protect forest elephants and great apes within the corridor.

Operationally, derailments on sections built over waterlogged embankments have been a recurrent source of service disruption since the 1990s. In 2017, SETEC, the French engineering consultancy, was engaged by SETRAG to delimit and propose consolidation measures for unstable zones along the entire Owendo–Franceville alignment.

== Connections and proposed extensions ==
The Trans-Gabon Railway has no cross-border connections, and the adjacent states of Equatorial Guinea, Cameroon and the Republic of the Congo each possess either no railway or unconnected, metre-gauge, or Cape-gauge networks. Two extensions have been proposed, repeatedly, since the 1980s:

- A Bélinga–Booué spur to open up the Bélinga iron-ore field in the north-east of the country. In 2005–2006, a Chinese consortium led by the China Machinery Engineering Corporation (CMEC) was granted exploration rights to Bélinga in exchange for a US$3 billion infrastructure package, which would have included a 560 km standard-gauge line linking Bélinga to the Transgabonais, a deep-water export port at Santa Clara, and a hydroelectric dam at Kongou Falls. The agreement was suspended amid environmental opposition and subsequent political changes and has not, as of 2026, produced any rail construction. In February 2023, the Australian mining group Fortescue signed a further agreement to develop Bélinga, again proposing combined road and rail infrastructure to an existing port. The project is planned to be completed by 2030.
- A south-eastern extension to Brazzaville in the Republic of the Congo, connecting the Transgabonais with the Congo–Ocean Railway, has been mooted at intervals since the late 1980s.

== See also ==
- Transport in Gabon
- AfricaRail
- Railway stations in Gabon
