= Mayumba, Gabon =

Mayumba
- Coat of arms

- Location in Gabon
- Coordinates: 3°25′S 10°39′E
- Country: Gabon
- Province: Nyanga Province

Population
  - Total: 5,208 (2,010)

Mayumba is a Vili- and Lumbu-speaking town of about 5,208 people on the Atlantic Ocean coast of Gabon, at the end of the N6 road, lying on a peninsula separated from the mainland by the Banio Lagoon.

== Description ==
Mayumba is situated on a peninsula between the Atlantic Ocean and the Banio Lagoon. The area is known for its sandy beaches, which serve as nesting sites for leatherback turtles. The primary ethnic groups in the town are the Vili, Lumbu, and Punu.

The town's infrastructure includes an airport, a market, seven primary schools, and a junior high school. Mayumba is located 20 kilometers (12 mi) north of Mayumba National Park, a protected area dedicated to marine species.

Oyster harvesting is a seasonal economic activity during the dry season (June to September) when increased salinity in the lagoon improves water visibility. Oysters are harvested by local divers and sold at the town market. The surrounding environment consists of savannah and coastal wetlands, which support wildlife such as sitatunga antelopes and various bird species.

== Climate ==
Mayumba has a tropical savanna climate (Köppen climate classification Aw).

Climate data for Mayumba
Month	Jan	Feb	Mar	Apr	May	Jun	Jul	Aug	Sep	Oct	Nov	Dec	Year
Mean daily maximum °C (°F)	28.3 (82.9)	28.9 (84.0)	30.4 (86.7)	30.5 (86.9)	29.1 (84.4)	25.9 (78.6)	25.7 (78.3)	25.9 (78.6)	26.6 (79.9)	27.6 (81.7)	28.2 (82.8)	27.2 (81.0)	27.9 (82.2)
Daily mean °C (°F)	25.7 (78.3)	26.2 (79.2)	27.0 (80.6)	27.1 (80.8)	26.1 (79.0)	23.4 (74.1)	22.5 (72.5)	22.9 (73.2)	24.0 (75.2)	25.1 (77.2)	25.5 (77.9)	25.1 (77.2)	25.1 (77.2)
Mean daily minimum °C (°F)	23.1 (73.6)	23.4 (74.1)	23.5 (74.3)	23.6 (74.5)	23.0 (73.4)	20.8 (69.4)	19.2 (66.6)	19.8 (67.6)	21.3 (70.3)	22.5 (72.5)	22.8 (73.0)	22.9 (73.2)	22.2 (72.0)
Average precipitation mm (inches)	236.6 (9.31)	245.7 (9.67)	219.3 (8.63)	126.3 (4.97)	74.6 (2.94)	5.5 (0.22)	0.4 (0.02)	5.9 (0.23)	44.7 (1.76)	214.4 (8.44)	335.9 (13.22)	163.7 (6.44)	1,673 (65.87)
Average precipitation days	12.6	12.4	13.8	10.2	7.2	0.9	0.7	3.9	13.9	18.9	18.6	11.5	124.6
Average relative humidity (%)	87	85	83	86	87	84	82	83	85	87	88	87	85
Source: NOAA
