= Booué =

Booué Mbue from the Shiwe language
- Town
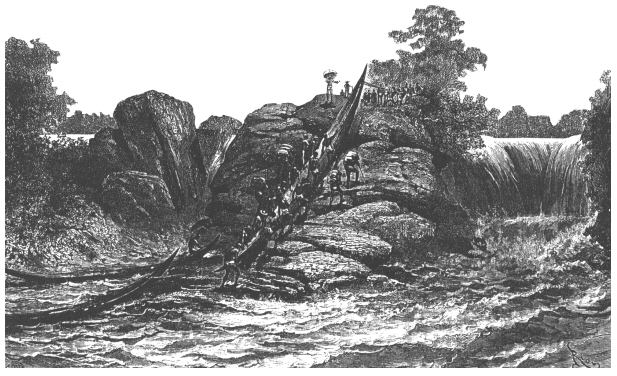
- Booué, March 1878, shortly before the town was founded

- Location in Gabon
- Coordinates: 00°06′00″S 11°56′00″E
- Country: Gabon
- Province: Ogooué-Ivindo Province
- Department: Lope Department

Booué is a small town in central Gabon. It is situated in Lopé Department, southwest side of the Ogooué-Ivindo Province. The town lies just 6.6 miles (10.6 kilometers) to the south of the Equator and is the province's only Department capital in the Southern Hemisphere.

== History ==
Booué is a bad transcription and a francization effort of the word "Mbue" or "Mboue" from the Shiwe language erroneously attributed to a town located in Ogooué-Ivindo province, Gabon by Pierre Savorgnan de Brazza in 1878. Booué is still referred to as "Mboue" by the Shiwe people who were the first settlers of this town and who named it Nangashiki, but was changed to Mboue and subsequently to Booué. From all historical accounts, this change resulted from a miscommunication between De Brazza and Mpami Nani Shui, a Shiwe Chief, during some negotiation talks between the two men. Many accounts from the Shiwe people indicate that while negotiating his passage to the upper Ogooué River, De Brazza asked Mpami Nani Shui the name of his village. Thinking that De Brazza was actually asking the name of an aquatic plant floating on the Ogooué River, he answered "Mboung" as the Shiwe people called it. De Brazza, thinking that he had been told the actual name of the village, wrote and recorded it as "Mboue", then Booué later on. Thus Mboue, as a village and later a town, was founded by the Shiwe people originating from the southeast of Cameroon between the eighteenth and nineteenth centuries; but the name Mboue itself and later its transcription "Booué" was mistakenly attributed to the village and later to the town by De Brazza. During the French colonization, Mboue was the capital city of the then Ogooué-Ivindo region until 1953. Today, it is just one of the four Department capital cities of the Ogooué-Ivindo Province.

== Transport ==
Visitors from other parts of Gabon and from overseas generally use the TRANSGABONAIS trains to get to Booué. It is a common way to travel to Booué, although it can be time-consuming. Booué has an airfield, but it is not widely used because it is not tarred. In addition, air tickets may be expensive since there is no regular airline serving the town. Visitors from other cities in Ogooué-Ivindo Province generally use rented minibuses, cars, and trucks to travel to Booué. Once in Booué, local cabs are available. A ferry is available to cross the Ogooué River free of charge, although a vehicle is required for the crossing.

== See also ==
- Railway stations in Gabon
