= Transport in Gabon =

Transportation of Gabon

Modes of transport in Gabon include rail, road, water and air. The one rail link, the Trans-Gabon Railway, connects the port of Owendo with the inland town of Franceville. While most of the country is connected by roads, not all areas are accessible. Much of the road network remains unpaved, and it primarily revolves around seven "national routes" labeled N1 through N7. The largest seaports are Port-Gentil and the newer Owendo, and 1,600 km of inland waterways are navigable. There are three international airports, eight other paved airports, and over 40 with unpaved runways. Nearly 300 km of pipelines carry petroleum products, mainly crude oil.

== Rail transport ==

Until the 1970s, Gabon had no permanent railroads, though temporary Decauville rail tracks were in use in the logging industry as early as 1913 (Gray and Ngolet, 1999, pp.102).

In 2003, the railway began the process of installing a satellite based telecommunications system. As of 2004, Gabon State Railways totalled 814 km of standard-gauge track.

The Trans-Gabon Railway, in operation since 1986, the 648-kilometer railway system connects Libreville to Franceville and carries 320,000 passengers annually while transporting manganese. A €330 million renovation, funded by France and the World Bank, began in 2015 to fix maintenance issues and support the economy.

total: 814 km (Gabon State Railways or OCTRA)
standard gauge: 814 km 1.435-m gauge; single track (1994)

=== Maps ===
- UN Map - shows line to Franceville
- UNHCR map - does not show line to Franceville
- TravelPortal map - shows major rivers
- UNJLC Rail map of Southern Africa - does not show line to Franceville

=== Cities served by rail ===
Existing

- Libreville - capital
- Owendo - port
- Sahoué - port
- Franceville - railhead
- Ndjolé
- Lopé
- Booué - likely junction for branchline to Makokou
- Lastoursville
- Moanda
- Ntoum - proposed junction for iron ore traffic to Santa Clara
- Kango
- Four-Place
- Mounana - ?

Proposed

- Makokou - iron ore
- Cape Santa Clara - proposed deep water port for Makokou iron ore.
- Bélinga - possible iron ore mine.

=== 2006 ===
- China signs a deal for an iron ore mine with associated rail and port upgrades from Belinga to Santa Clara

=== 2007 ===
- New rail line from Belinga will go 450 km all the way to the coast, rather than to be a branch off an existing line.
- Pan-African issues

== Road transport ==
total: 7,670 km
paved: 629 km (including 30 km of expressways)
unpaved: 7,041 km (1996 est.)

Roads in Gabon link most areas of the country, and many of the main roads are of a reasonable standard. However, remoter areas along the coast and in the east are often not connected to the road network. Major roads are denoted national routes and numbered, with a prefix "N" (sometimes "RN"):

- N1 road: Libreville – Kougouleu – Bifoun – Lambaréné – Mouila – Ndendé – Tchibanga - (Republic of Congo)
- N2 road: Bifoun – Alembe – Viate – Mitzic – Bibasse – Oyem – Bitam – Éboro – (Cameroon)
- N3 road: Alembe – Kazamabika – Lastoursville – Moanda – Franceville
- N4 road: Viate – Ekonlong – Makokou – Mékambo
- N5 road: Kougouleu – Bibasse
- N6 road: Mayumba – Tchibanga – Ndendé – Lébamba - Koulamoutou – Lastoursville
- N7 road: Makokou – Bakwaka – Okondja – Lékori - Akiéni – Ngouoni – Franceville

== Water transport ==
=== Merchant marine ===
As of 2002, there was one merchant marine vessel, with a gross tonnage of 2,419/3,205 tonnes deadweight (DWT).

=== Waterways ===
Gabon has 1,600 km of perennially navigable waterways, including 310 km on the Ogooué River.

=== Seaports and harbors ===
Gabon’s seaports and harbors are overseen by the Office des Ports et Rades du Gabon (OPRAG), the national port authority. Owendo, Libreville, and Port-Gentil are identified as its ports, and AIVP notes that OPRAG is empowered to manage the country’s harbors, including Mayumba, Mondah, Port-Gentil, Libreville, and Fernan-Vaz. In 2017, the New Owendo International Port (NOIP) was inaugurated near Libreville as part of the Nkok Special Economic Zone programme. Built in around 18 months for an investment of about US$300 million, its multipurpose terminal has a 420-metre quay and two berths dredged to 13 metres to accommodate Panamax vessels, with an annual handling capacity of roughly 130,000 TEU; it was developed through a partnership between Bolloré Transport & Logistics and the Olam-backed GSEZ Ports. Owendo also hosts a dedicated mineral port, used chiefly for the export of manganese.

All cargo destined for Gabon must be covered by a BIETC (Bordereau d’Identification Électronique de Traçabilité des Cargaisons), an electronic cargo tracking note. The BIETC is issued and validated by the Conseil Gabonais des Chargeurs (Gabonese Shippers' Council), the national shippers' council, which records the bill-of-lading data to enable cargo traceability and customs control. BIETC is compulsory for customs clearance and, BIETC number must appear on the bill of lading and the manifest; shipping guidance also lists the usual supporting documents as the bill of lading, commercial invoice, freight invoice, and customs declaration.

== Air transport ==
There are three international airports: Libreville, Port-Gentil, and Franceville.

=== Airports - with paved runways ===
total: 11
over 3,047 m: 1
2,438 to 3,047 m: 1
1,524 to 2,437 m: 8
914 to 1,523 m: 1 (1999 est.)

=== Airports - with unpaved runways ===
total: 45
1,524 to 2,437 m: 9
914 to 1,523 m: 16
under 914 m: 25 (1999 est.)

== Pipelines ==
Crude oil 270 km; petroleum products 14 km

== See also ==
- COMILOG Cableway
