= Air Service Gabon =

Airline of Gabon

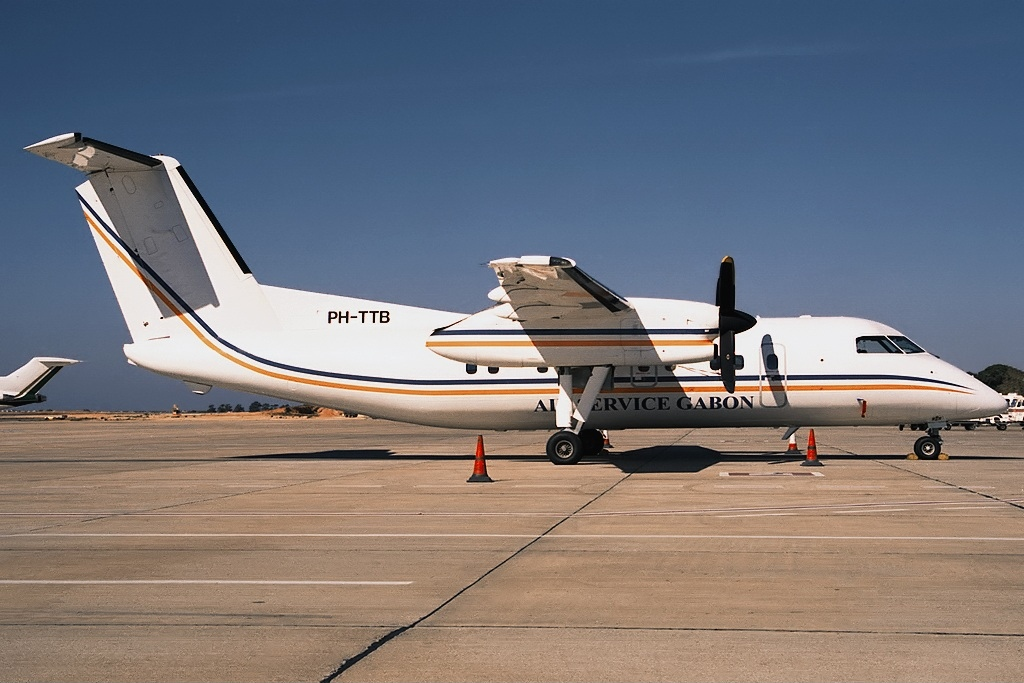
- Bombardier Dash 8-102A, Air Service Gabon
IATA	ICAO	Call sign
G8	AGB	—
- Founded: 1965
- Ceased operations: 2010
- Hubs: Libreville International Airport
- Fleet size: 5
- Headquarters: Libreville, Gabon
- Website: http://www.airservice.aero/?id_Sessionlangue=2

Air Service Gabon was an airline based in Libreville, Gabon. It was established in 1965 and operated scheduled flights and passenger and charter services in West Africa. Its main base was Libreville International Airport. The company announced that it ceased operation as of August 3, 2010.

The airline is on the List of air carriers banned in the European Union.

== Destinations ==
Air Service Gabon operated scheduled services to the following destinations (at March 2009):

- Cameroon
  - Douala (Douala International Airport)
- Gabon
  - Franceville (M'Vengue El Hadj Omar Bongo Ondimba International Airport)
  - Gamba (Gamba Airport)
  - Koulamoutou (Koula Moutou Airport)
  - Libreville (Libreville International Airport)
  - Makokou (Makokou Airport)
  - Mouila (Mouila Airport)
  - Oyem (Oyem Airport)
  - Port-Gentil (Port-Gentil International Airport)
- Republic of the Congo
  - Brazzaville (Maya-Maya Airport)
  - Pointe-Noire (Pointe Noire Airport)
- São Tomé and Príncipe
  - São Tomé (São Tomé International Airport)

== Fleet ==
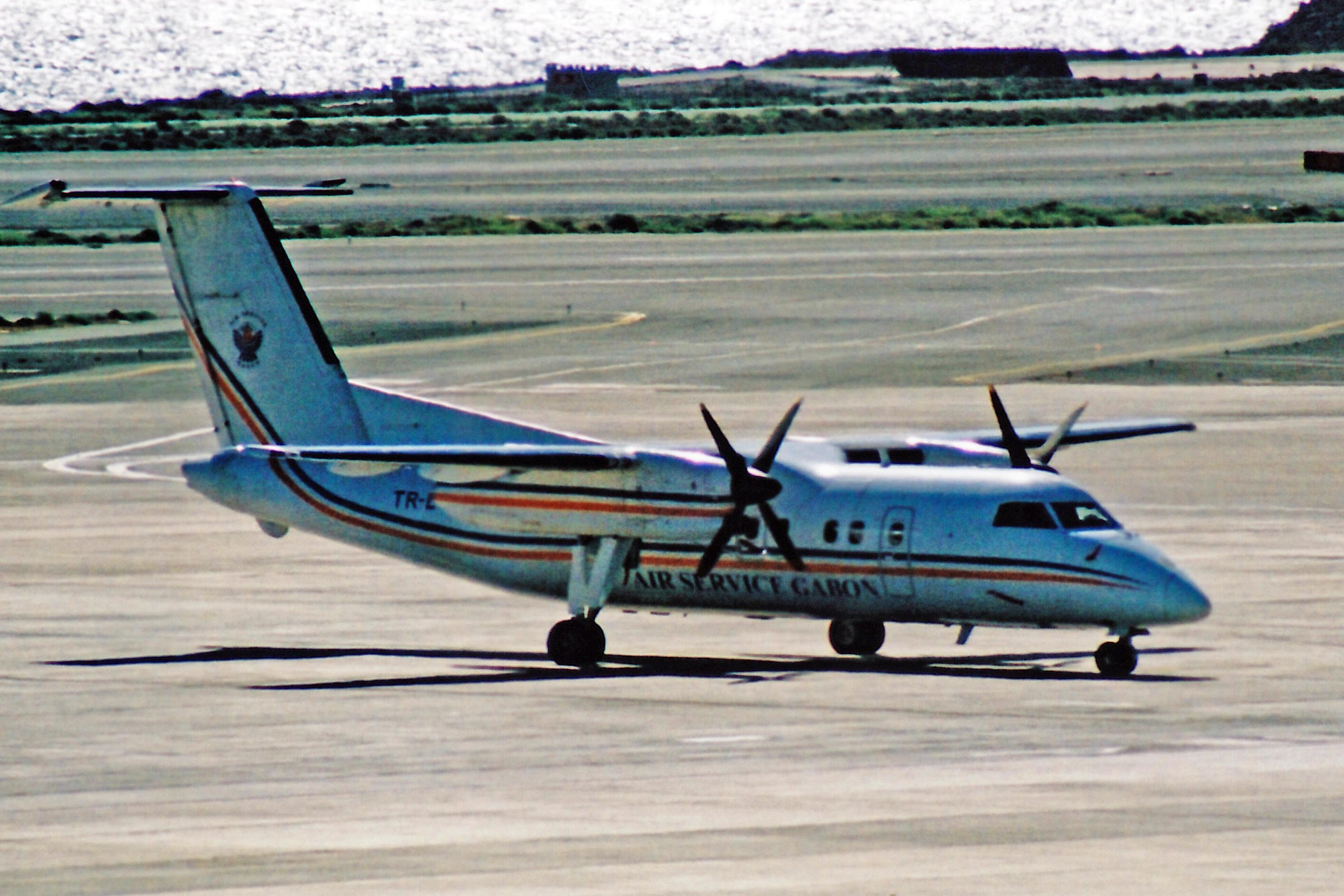
A Dash 8-100 at La Palma in 2003.

The Air Service Gabon fleet consisted of the following aircraft (as of 15 November 2009):

- 4 Bombardier Dash 8-100
- 1 Bombardier Dash 8-300
