= List of airlines of the Republic of the Congo =

This is a list of airlines currently operating in the Republic of the Congo. All of the currently operating airlines are banned from operating in the EU (except in some special cases).

Airline	IATA	ICAO	Callsign	Image
Africa Airlines				
Brazza Airlines				
Canadian Airways Congo				
Equatorial Congo Airlines	EJ	EQA	ECAIR	
Equaflight	E7	EKA	EQUAFLIGHT	
Trans Air Congo	Q8	TSG	TRANS-CONGO	

== See also ==
- List of airlines
- List of defunct airlines of Africa
- List of defunct airlines of the Republic of the Congo
