= 2011 Trans Air Congo Antonov An-12 crash =

Aviation accident in Republic of the Congo

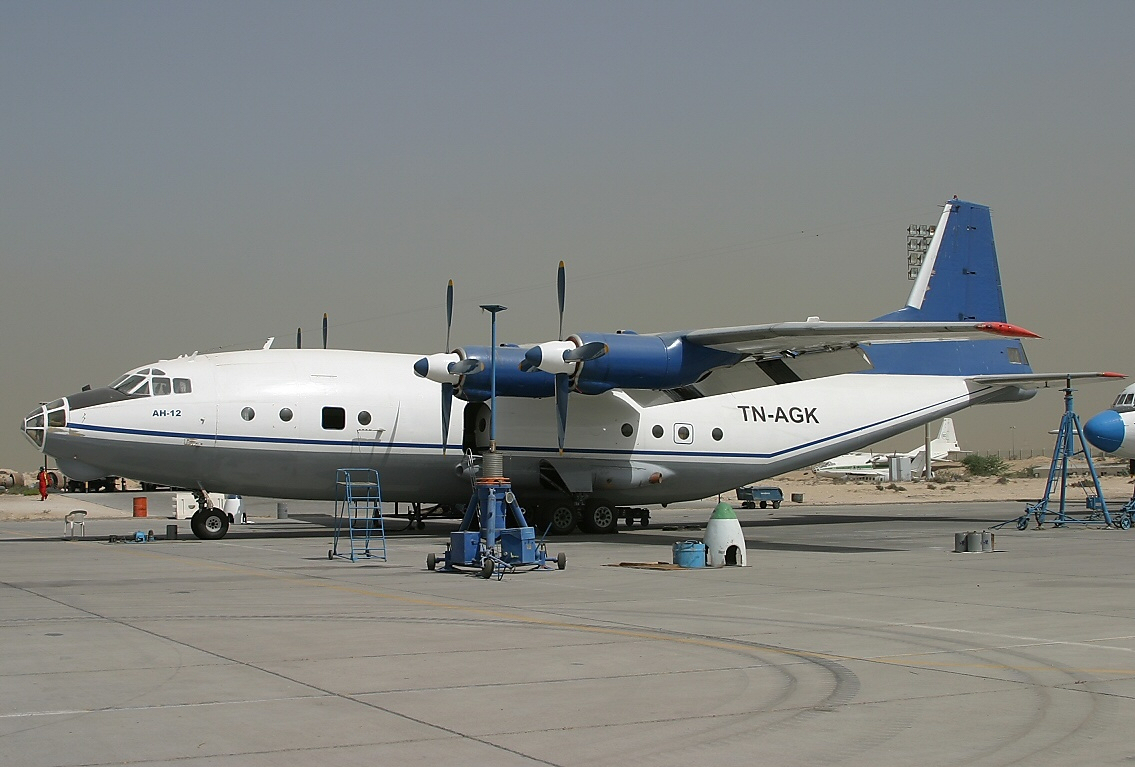
- TN-AGK, the AN-12 involved, seen at Sharjah Airport in 2004

Accident
- Date: 21 March 2011
- Summary: Loss of control
- Site: Pointe-Noire, Republic of the Congo; 04°46′39″S 011°52′19″E
- Total fatalities: 23
- Total injuries: 14

Aircraft
- Aircraft type: Antonov An-12
- Operator: Trans Air Congo
- Registration: TN-AGK
- Flight origin: Maya-Maya Airport, Brazzaville, Republic of the Congo
- Destination: Agostinho-Neto International Airport, Pointe-Noire, Republic of the Congo
- Occupants: 4
- Crew: 4
- Fatalities: 4
- Survivors: 0

Ground casualties
- Ground fatalities: 19
- Ground injuries: 14

On 21 March 2011, a non-airworthy Antonov An-12 transport aircraft of Trans Air Congo crashed into a densely populated neighbourhood of Pointe Noire, Republic of the Congo, while on final approach to land. All four occupants of the aircraft and 19 people on the ground were killed. Fourteen more people on the ground were injured.

== Accident ==
The Antonov An-12 was on a domestic cargo flight from Brazzaville to Pointe Noire Airport in the Republic of the Congo. At around 15:30 local time on 21 March (14:30 UTC), while on final approach to the airport's runway 17, the aircraft rolled inverted and crashed to the ground in the Mvoumvou district of Pointe Noire. Weather conditions at the time were reported as good. According to the Russian Embassy, the flight had attempted an emergency ditching in the sea, but was unable to do so.

Four crew members were on board. It was initially reported that five 'illegal' passengers were also on board, but this was later stated not to be the case. The use of the Antonov An-12 for carrying passengers is prohibited in the Republic of the Congo.

There were conflicting reports about the number of dead and injured, with figures of 16, 17, and 19 reported. On 23 March, the Pointe-Noire mayor Roland Bouiti-Viaudo stated that 23 bodies had been recovered to date. The number of injured was 14. On 23 March, Congo's Agence Nationale de l'Aviation Civile du Congo issued an update stating only four crew were on the aircraft. They were killed, as were 19 on the ground.

A video of the accident shows the Antonov rolling to starboard and nosediving to the ground inverted. In the video, the aircraft appears to be correctly configured for landing, with landing gear and flaps extended, but only engines No. 1 and 2 appear to be operating, trailing the characteristic smoke. A failure of both engines on the same wing for the aircraft type involved could reportedly lead to loss of control, due to the rudder not having sufficient authority to counter the asymmetric thrust.

== Aircraft ==
The aircraft involved was a Soviet-built Antonov An-12 with Congolese registration TN-AGK. It was fitted with four turboprop engines Ivchenko AI-20. Built in 1963, the aircraft was no longer airworthy, according to a list published in 2006 by the International Civil Aviation Organization.

== Investigation ==
A joint committee was set up by the Congolese Government to investigate the accident. Committee members include members of the Government, the police and representatives from the aviation industry in the Republic of the Congo.
