= Gabon Express Flight 221 =

2004 aviation accident in Gabon

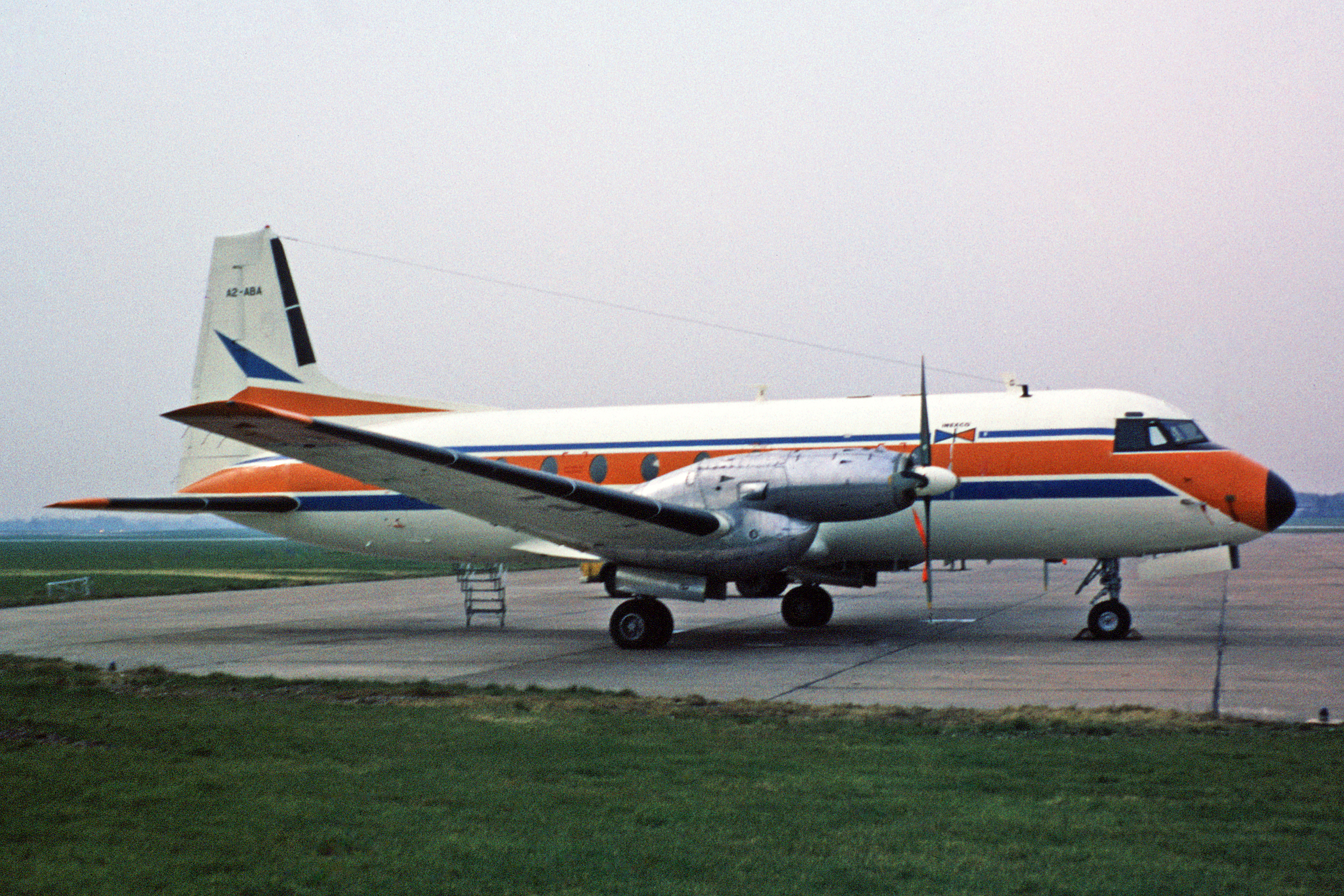
- A2-ABA, the aircraft involved in the accident in 1974 while still in service with Air Botswana

Occurrence
- Date: 8 June 2004
- Summary: Hydraulic failure due to engine failure
- Site: Gulf of Guinea, near Libreville International Airport, Libreville, Gabon; 0.450°N 9.393°E

Aircraft
- Aircraft type: Hawker Siddeley HS 748
- Operator: Gabon Express
- Registration: TR-LFW
- Flight origin: Libreville International Airport, Libreville, Gabon
- Stopover: Port-Gentil International Airport, Port-Gentil, Gabon
- Destination: M'Vengue El Hadj Omar Bongo Ondimba International Airport, Franceville, Gabon
- Occupants: 30
- Passengers: 26
- Crew: 4
- Fatalities: 19
- Injuries: 11
- Survivors: 11

Gabon Express Flight 221 was a scheduled domestic passenger flight which ditched 100 metres offshore into the Gulf of Guinea on 8 June 2004. The Hawker Siddeley HS 748 was carrying 26 passengers and 4 crew and was flying from Gabon's capital Libreville to Franceville via Port-Gentil when an engine failed. The crew returned to Libreville International Airport; however they overflew it and landed in the sea, within metres of a beach. At least 19 people were killed as a result of the crash. It was the second deadliest plane crash in Gabon. Gabon President Omar Bongo declared three days of national mourning in response to the disaster.

== Aircraft and crew ==
The aircraft involved was a 37-year-old Hawker Siddeley HS 748 registered as TR-LFW. It was powered by two Rolls-Royce Dart engines. The aircraft was carrying 26 passengers and 4 crew members.

== Accident ==
On 8 June 2004, shortly after take-off from Libreville International Airport, the right-hand engine failed. The crew returned to Libreville but had problems lowering the undercarriage. At 09:34, uncertain on whether the landing gear was extended, the pilot ditched the aircraft offshore, around 3 kilometres (1.9 mi; 1.6 nmi) away from the airport, a few dozens of metres away from the beach of La Sablière.

=== Search and rescue ===
Immediately after the crash, fire crew and emergency services were deployed. Eleven survivors were evacuated from the scene and were taken by helicopters to local hospital in Libreville; none had received serious injuries. Divers were deployed by authorities to rescue people trapped inside the wreckage. Local fishermen, Gabonese firefighters, the French Navy, and the French military also joined the rescue effort. As the aircraft did not immediately sink, fishermen were able to rescue multiple passengers.

== Aftermath ==
The following day, President of Gabon Omar Bongo declared three days of national mourning in honor to the victims of the crash, with the government's office stating that a national funeral would be organised. Families of the victims boycotted the official mourning ceremony organized by the government, which had been scheduled for 14 June, believing that faster rescue efforts would have prevented the fatalities.

The crash also renewed debates of aviation safety and the effectiveness of rescues in the event of a disaster in Gabon. On 15 June, the airline ceased operations.

=== Investigation ===
By 29 July, according to the investigation's preliminary findings, the hydraulic pump on the left engine experienced problems, preventing the failure of the right engine from being compensated. In addition, documents relating to the aircraft's maintenance operations were only correctly maintained until 9 April 2004. An investigation later revealed that the crash was caused by the government's poor aircraft maintenance standards.
