= TCH =

TCH may refer to:

- TCH (chemotherapy), a chemotherapy regimen
- Chad, by international vehicle registration code
- Czechoslovakia, by International Olympic Committee code
- Texas Children's Hospital
- Thomas Crosbie Holdings, Irish media group
- Trans-Canada Highway
- Tchibanga Airport, by IATA code
- Canberra Hospital, ACT Australia (formally known as the Woden hospital)

== See also ==
- ТСН (Televiziyna Sluzhba Novyn), a Ukrainian news programme
