= FCBB =

FCBB may refer to:

== Buildings and structures ==
- Maya-Maya Airport (IATA: BZV, ICAO: FCBB) is an airport located in Brazzaville, the capital of the Republic of the Congo.

== Sports ==
- FC Bayern Munich (basketball) (also abbreviated as FC Bayern (basketball) or FCBB) is a German professional team.
