= EKG (disambiguation) =

EKG may refer to:

- EKG (album), by Edyta Górniak
- Afric Aviation, a Gabonese airline
- Ekari language
- Electrocardiography
- Evangelisches Kirchengesangbuch, a hymnal
