= Impfondo Airport =

- IATA: ION; ICAO: FCOI

Summary
- Airport type: Public
- Serves: Impfondo, Republic of the Congo
- Elevation AMSL: 1,099 ft / 335 m
- Coordinates: 01°35′22″N 018°02′42″E

Map
- Location in the Republic of the Congo

Runways
Direction	Length		Surface
Direction	m	ft	Surface
09/27	2,050	6,726	Asphalt
- Source: GCM Google Maps

Impfondo Airport (IATA: ION, ICAO: FCOI) is an airport serving the city of Impfondo, Republic of the Congo.

The runway has an additional 63 metres (207 ft) of paved overrun on each end. East approach and departure will cross the Ubangi River, which is the international border with the Democratic Republic of the Congo.

== Airlines and destinations ==
Airlines	Destinations
Canadian Airways Congo	Brazzaville

== See also ==
- List of airports in the Republic of the Congo
- Transport in the Republic of the Congo
