= List of defunct airlines of the Republic of the Congo =

This is a list of defunct airlines of the Republic of the Congo.

Airline	Image	IATA	ICAO	Callsign	Commenced operations	Ceased operations	Notes
ACA Air					1998	1998	
Aero Freight Partner					2005	2006	
Aero Fret Business					2006	2009	AOC revoked. Operated Antonov An-12
Aéro-Service		BF	RSR	CONGOSERV	1967	2019	
Africargo Airlines					1987	1988	
Air Afrique		RK	RKA	AIRAFRIC	1961	2002	
Air Atlantic Congo					2001	2004	Operated Antonov An-24, ATR 72, Boeing 707, Boeing 727
Air Congo (Brazzaville)					1964	1965	Renamed to Lina Congo
Air Congo (Compagnie Congolaise de Transports Aeriens)					1961	1964	Renamed to Air Congo (Brazzaville)
Air CEMAC					2001	2018	never flew
Air Congo International					2006	2008	Renamed to Air Congo. Operated BAe 146, Boeing 737, Comac ARJ21, Xian MA60
Air Espace					1999	1999	Operated HS 748
Airlink Congo					1993	1996	
Bravo Air Congo Brazzaville		K6	BRV		2007	2007	Operated Douglas DC-9
Brazza Airways					2008	2009	Operated Antonov An-12
Cargo Express Congo				ARGO EXPRESS	1997	1998	Operated HS Andover, Douglas DC-4
Clesh Aviation					2007	2009	Operated Boeing 727
Compagnie Aériénne Maouene					2004	2009	Operated Let Turbolet
Congo Airlines					2004	2006	
ECL-Air					1980s	1980s	Operated Douglas DC-4
Emeraude					2012	2020	Air taxi service. AOC revoked
Equatorial Congo Airlines		LC	PTI	ECAIR	2010	2016	
Kalanga Air Services					2005	2006	Operated HS 748
Lina Congo		GC	GCB	LINACONGO	1961	2002	
Mani Air Fret					2007	2009	Operated Antonov An-12
Mistral Aviation					2008	2014	Operated Douglas DC-9
Natalco Air Lines		OD	NCO		2003	2009	
Nouvelle Air Congo					2008	?	
Protocole Aviation					2005	2009	Operated Douglas DC-8

== See also ==
- List of airlines of the Republic of the Congo
- List of airports in the Republic of the Congo
