= Antonio Agostinho Neto Airport =

Antonio Agostinho Neto Airport may refer to:

- Dr. Antonio Agostinho Neto International Airport serving Luanda in Angola
- Agostinho-Neto International Airport serving Pointe-Noire in Republic of Congo
