= National Airways =

National Airways may refer to:

- National Airways Cameroon, a defunct Cameroon airline
- National Airways Ethiopia, an airline having started its operations in 2007 in Ethiopia
- National Airways Gabon, an airline having started its operations in 2002 in Gabon
- National Airways Corporation (South Africa), a South African commercial aviation company
- New Zealand National Airways Corporation, a defunct New Zealand airline
