= La Nationale =

Airline of Gabon

La Nationale Transport Nationale Régionale
IATA	ICAO	Call sign
-	NRG	LA NATIONALE
- Founded: 2002
- Hubs: Libreville International Airport
- Fleet size: 2
- Destinations: 9
- Headquarters: Libreville, Gabon

La Nationale (formerly Nationale Regionale Transport, French: Transport Nationale Régionale) is a domestic airline based in Libreville, Gabon. Its main base is Libreville International Airport. It was rebranded in 2009 from National Airways Gabon to La Nationale.

== Destinations ==
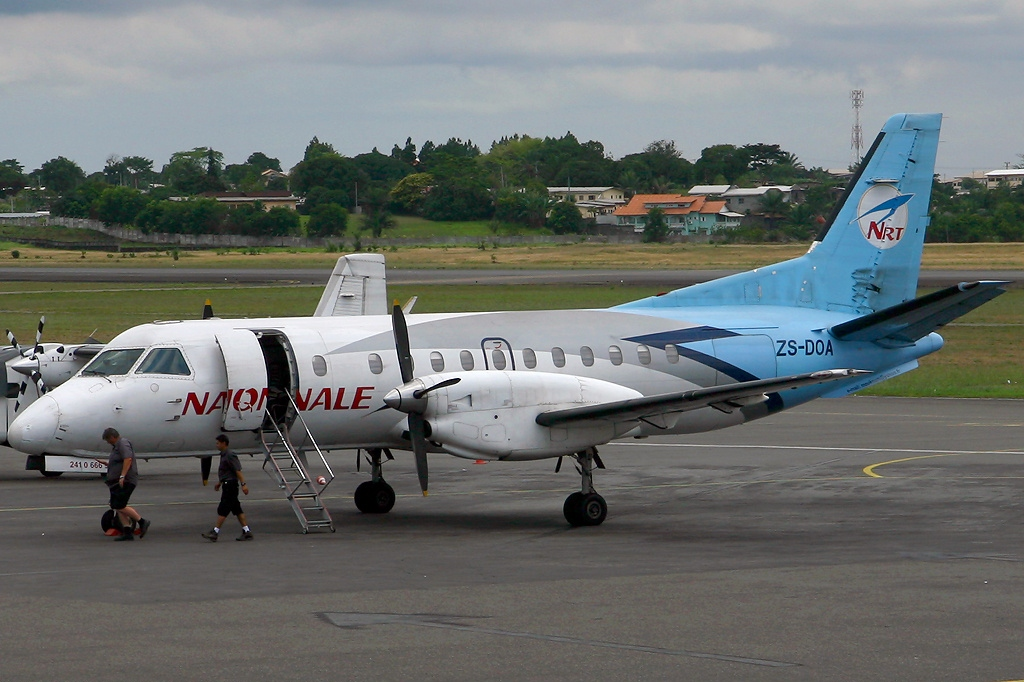
A Nationale Regionale Transport Saab 340A at Libreville, Gabon. (2008)

^{[Base]}	Base

City	Country	IATA	ICAO	Airport
Franceville	Gabon	MVB	FOON	M'Vengue El Hadj Omar Bongo Ondimba International Airport
Koulamoutou	Gabon	KOU	FOGK	Koulamoutou Airport
Libreville	Gabon	LBV	FOOL	Libreville International Airport ^{[Base]}
Makokou	Gabon	MKU	FOOK	Makokou Airport
Mayumba	Gabon	MYB	FOOY	Mayumba Airport
Mouila	Gabon	MJL	FOGM	Mouila Airport
Oyem	Gabon	OYM	FOGO	Oyem Airport
Port-Gentil	Gabon	POG	FOOG	Port-Gentil International Airport
Tchibanga	Gabon	TCH	FOOT	Tchibanga Airport

== Fleet ==
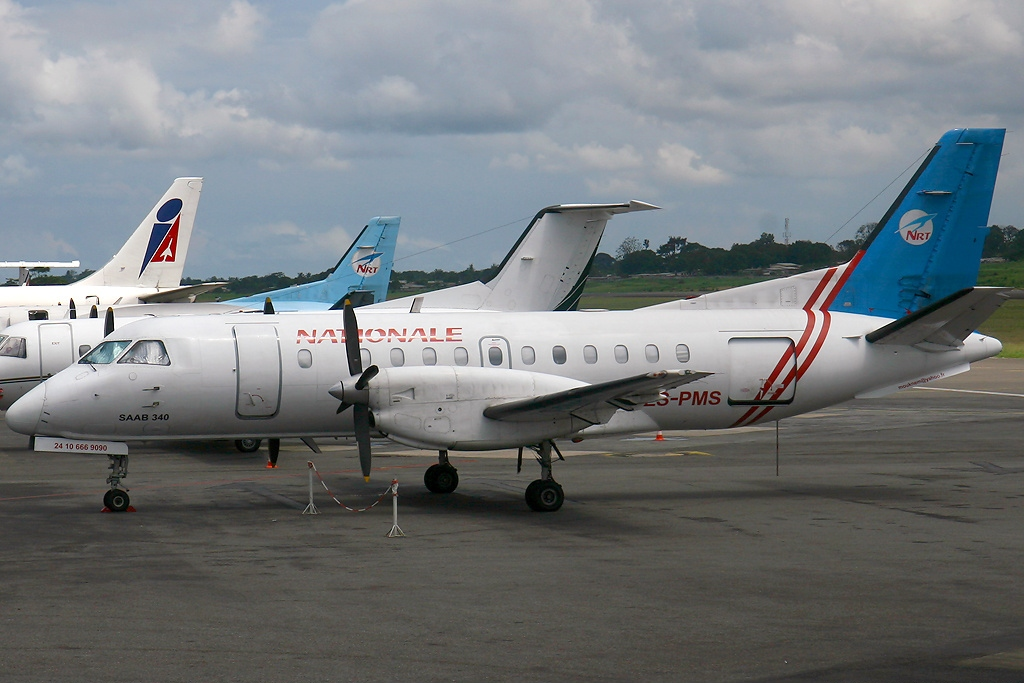
A Nationale Regionale Transport Saab 340A at Libreville, Gabon. (2008)

=== Current ===
As of April 2019, The Nationale Regionale Transport fleet includes the following aircraft:

Nationale Regionale Transport fleet
Aircraft	In fleet	Notes
Embraer 120ER	2	Operated by Sahara African Aviation
Embraer 120RT	1	Stored at MQP
Total	3	

=== Previously operated ===
Nationale Regionale Transport has also operated the following aircraft:

- Saab 340A

== Accidents and incidents ==
- On October 12, 2011, a Nationale Regionale Transport EMB-120, registration ZS-PYO (MSN: 120245) performing a charter flight from Libreville to Port Gentil (Gabon), overran runway 21's end and came to a stop with the nose gear intact, both main gear struts bent backwards causing the engines to "pitch down" together with the wings. A few passengers sustained minor injuries, but the aircraft was damaged beyond repair and was written off
