= 2012 Aéro-Service Ilyushin Il-76 crash =

Aviation accident in the Republic of the Congo

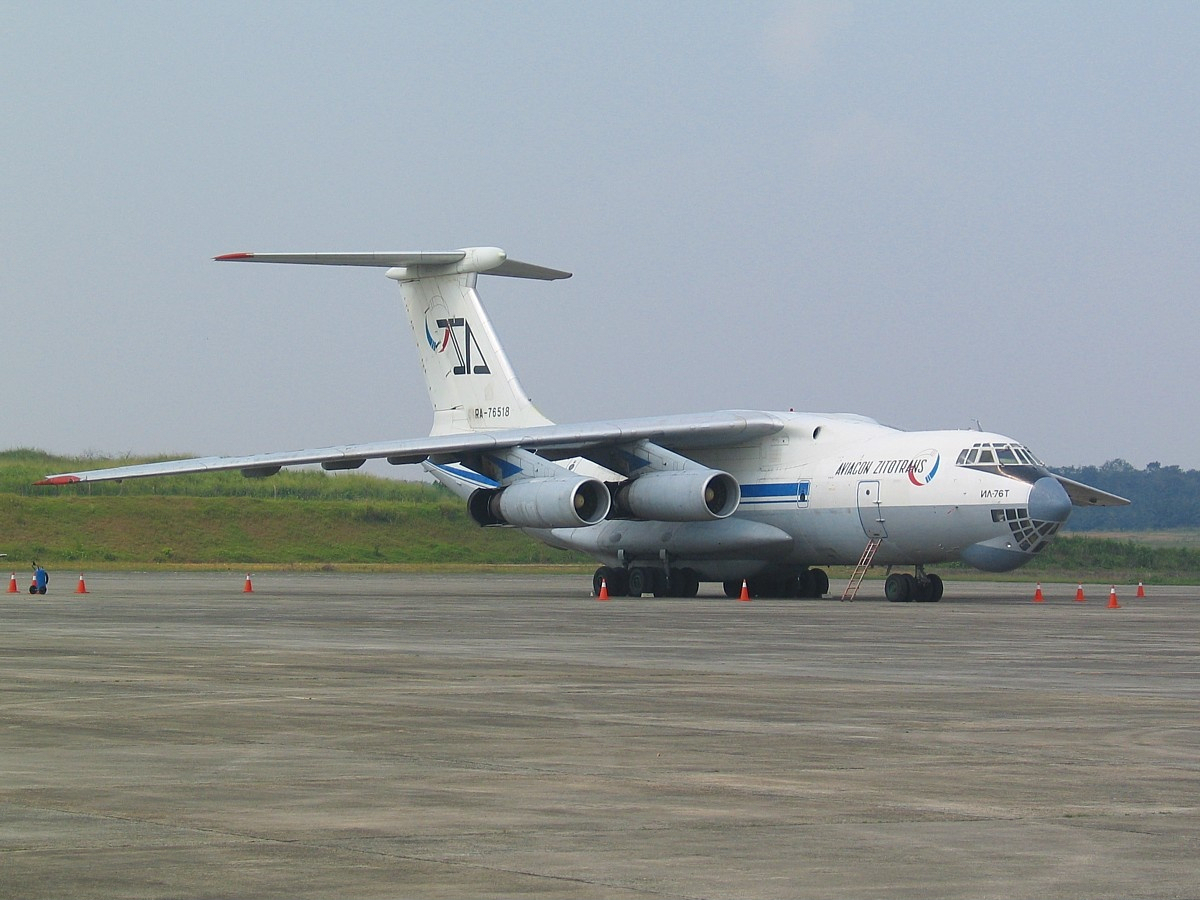
- An Ilyushin Il-76 similar to the aircraft involved

Accident
- Date: 30 November 2012
- Summary: Crashed during final approach; under investigation
- Site: Maya-Maya Airport, Brazzaville, Republic of the Congo; 4°15′50.50″S 15°14′6.92″E
- Total fatalities: 32
- Total injuries: 14

Aircraft
- Aircraft type: Ilyushin Il-76T
- Operator: Air Highnesses on behalf of Aéro-Service
- Registration: EK-76300
- Flight origin: Pointe Noire Airport, Republic of the Congo
- Destination: Maya-Maya Airport, Brazzaville, Republic of the Congo
- Occupants: 6
- Passengers: 1
- Crew: 5
- Fatalities: 6
- Survivors: 0

Ground casualties
- Ground fatalities: 26
- Ground injuries: 14

On 30 November 2012, an Ilyushin Il-76 freighter aircraft, operated by the Armenian cargo airline Air Highnesses on behalf of Congolese cargo airline Aéro-Service, crashed on landing at Brazzaville, Republic of the Congo, killing all six occupants and 26 people on the ground.

The aircraft was on a domestic flight from Pointe Noire Airport to Maya-Maya Airport and was attempting to land on runway 5L in heavy rain when it clipped high trees about 1,000 metres (3,300 ft; 1,100 yd) from the runway threshold, disintegrating over 500 metres (1,600 ft; 550 yd). The aircraft caught fire and was destroyed, killing all five Armenian crew and an Armenian policeman present on board, as well as 26 local residents, injuring a further 14.

== Investigation ==
In February 2013, the Russian Interstate Aviation Committee (IAC) received the flight data recorder and the cockpit voice recorder for analysis on behalf of the Ministry of Transport of the Republic of the Congo, and was working to download the data.
