= Ouésso Airport =

Airport on the Republic of the Congo

- IATA: OUE; ICAO: FCOU

Summary
- Airport type: Public
- Operator: Government
- Location: Ouésso
- Elevation AMSL: 1,158 ft (353 m)
- Coordinates: 1°36′55″N 16°02′15″E

Map
- Location in the Republic of the Congo

Runways
Direction	Length		Surface
Direction	m	ft	Surface
01/19	3,000	9,843	Asphalt
- Source: WAD GCM Google Maps

The Ouésso Airport (IATA: OUE, ICAO: FCOU) is an airport serving Ouésso, the capital of the Sangha Department in the Republic of the Congo.

The Ouésso non-directional beacon (Ident: OU) is in the town, 1.3 nautical miles (2.4 km) east of the airport.

== History ==
The Ouésso Airport was opened in 2007 by president Denis Sassou Nguesso. The airport was renovated in 2020, which lowered the number of total flights.

== Airlines and destinations ==
Airlines	Destinations
Canadian Airways Congo	Brazzaville

== See also ==
- List of airports in the Republic of the Congo
- Transport in the Republic of the Congo
