= Equaflight =

Congolese airline

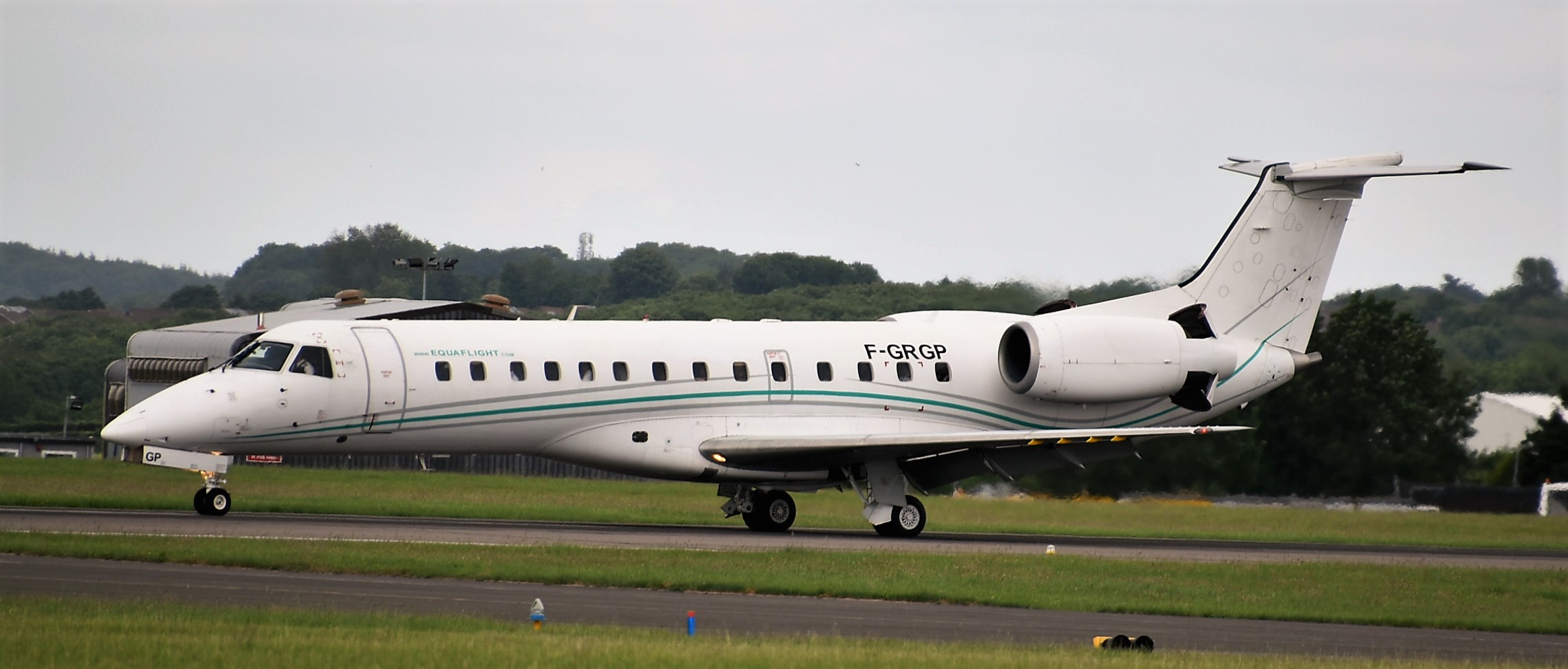
IATA	ICAO	Call sign
E7	EKA	EQUAFLIGHT
- Founded: 1998
- Hubs: Pointe Noire Airport
- Subsidiaries: Afric Aviation
- Fleet size: 3
- Destinations: 3 (scheduled)
- Parent company: Regourd Aviation
- Headquarters: Pointe-Noire, Republic of the Congo
- Website: www.equaflight.com

Equaflight (also known as Equaflight Services) is an airline based in Pointe-Noire, Republic of the Congo, operating scheduled and chartered flights (passenger as well as cargo) out of its base at Pointe Noire Airport. The company was founded in 1998. Along with all airlines registered in the Republic of the Congo, Equaflight is banned from entering the European Union since 2009. It is a subsidiary of Regourd Aviation.

== Destinations ==
Equaflight operates scheduled passenger flights to the following destinations:

Republic of the Congo

- Brazzaville – Maya-Maya Airport
- Pointe-Noire – Pointe Noire Airport base

Gabon

- Port-Gentil – Port-Gentil International Airport

Additionally, the airline operates on-demand business charter flights under the Equajet brand.

Angola

- Luanda – Quatro de Fevereiro Airport

== Fleet ==
As of April 2019, the Equaflight fleet consisted of the following aircraft:

Equaflight fleet
Aircraft	In service	Passengers (Economy)	Notes
Dassault Falcon 900X	1		
Beechcraft 1900C	1	19	
Embraer ERJ 135	1	37	
Total	3		

=== Former fleet ===
- 1 ATR 42-300
- 1 ATR 42-320
- 1 Embraer EMB 120 Brasilia
- 1 Dornier 228-212

== Certification ==
Equaflight is IOSA registered since July 15, 2011, and become the first airline in Central Africa to obtain this label.
