= WIETC =

Chinese construction contractor

Weihai International Economic & Technical Cooperative Co., Ltd.
- Company type: Privately-owned enterprise
- Industry: Construction
- Headquarters: Weihai, China
- Website: Official website (in English)

WIETC
- Simplified Chinese: 威海国际经济技术合作股份有限公司
- Traditional Chinese: 威海國際經濟技術合作股份有限公司
Transcriptions
Standard Mandarin
- Hanyu Pinyin: Wēihǎi Guójì Jīngjì Jìshù Hézuò Gǔfènyǒuxiàngōngsī

Weihai International Economic & Technical Cooperative Co., Ltd. (abbreviated as WIETC) is a Chinese construction contractor that specializes in overseas construction and engineering projects. Based on international project revenue of $228.8 million in 2012, the company was listed among the 250 largest international contractors by the Engineering News-Record.

The company has a major presence in building key infrastructure in Congo-Brazzaville including 15 projects, according to a 2009 report. One project is the construction of upgrades to Maya-Maya International Airport in a $160 million project. The upgrades consisted of primarily building two modules of a new terminal for handling domestic and international traffic separately, and work on a new runway, rehabilitation of another runway, and building of a transformer sub-station. The company works with the Congolese government in a public-private partnership to build up the national housing stock, a shortage that is one of the main concerns of poverty alleviation.

In China Safari, a book published in 2008 about China-Africa relations, the company features prominently in a chapter about Congo-Brazzaville. The author documents a symbiotic relationship between the Congolese minister of construction and housing, Claude Alphonse N'Silou, who needed to get public goods delivered fast to win his parliamentary seat, with WIETC which was able to build infrastructure at a speed that impressed the minister. In the book the minister heaps praise on the company in the following quote: "They come from so far away, yet look how quickly they adapt. They live modestly, as we do, and we all get along very well with one another."
