= Oyem Airport =

Oyem Airport Aéroport d'Oyém
- IATA: OYE; ICAO: FOGO

Summary
- Owner: Government
- Location: Oyem, Gabon
- Elevation AMSL: 2,165 ft / 660 m
- Coordinates: 1°32′30″N 11°34′50″E

Map
- Location within Gabon

Runways
Direction	Length		Surface
Direction	m	ft	Surface
03/21	1,800	5,906	Asphalt
- Sources: GCM

Oyem Airport (French: Aéroport d'Oyém) (IATA: OYE, ICAO: FOGO) is an airport serving the city of Oyem, in Woleu-Ntem Province, Gabon. The airport is 4 kilometres (2.5 mi) south of the city.

== Airlines and destinations ==
Airlines	Destinations
AfriJet	Libreville, Port-Gentil
Nationale Regionale Transport	Libreville, Port-Gentil

== See also ==
- List of airports in Gabon
- Transport in Gabon
