= Lomé–Tokoin International Airport =

International airport serving Lomé, Togo

Gnassingbé Eyadéma International Airport Aéroport international Gnassingbé Eyadéma
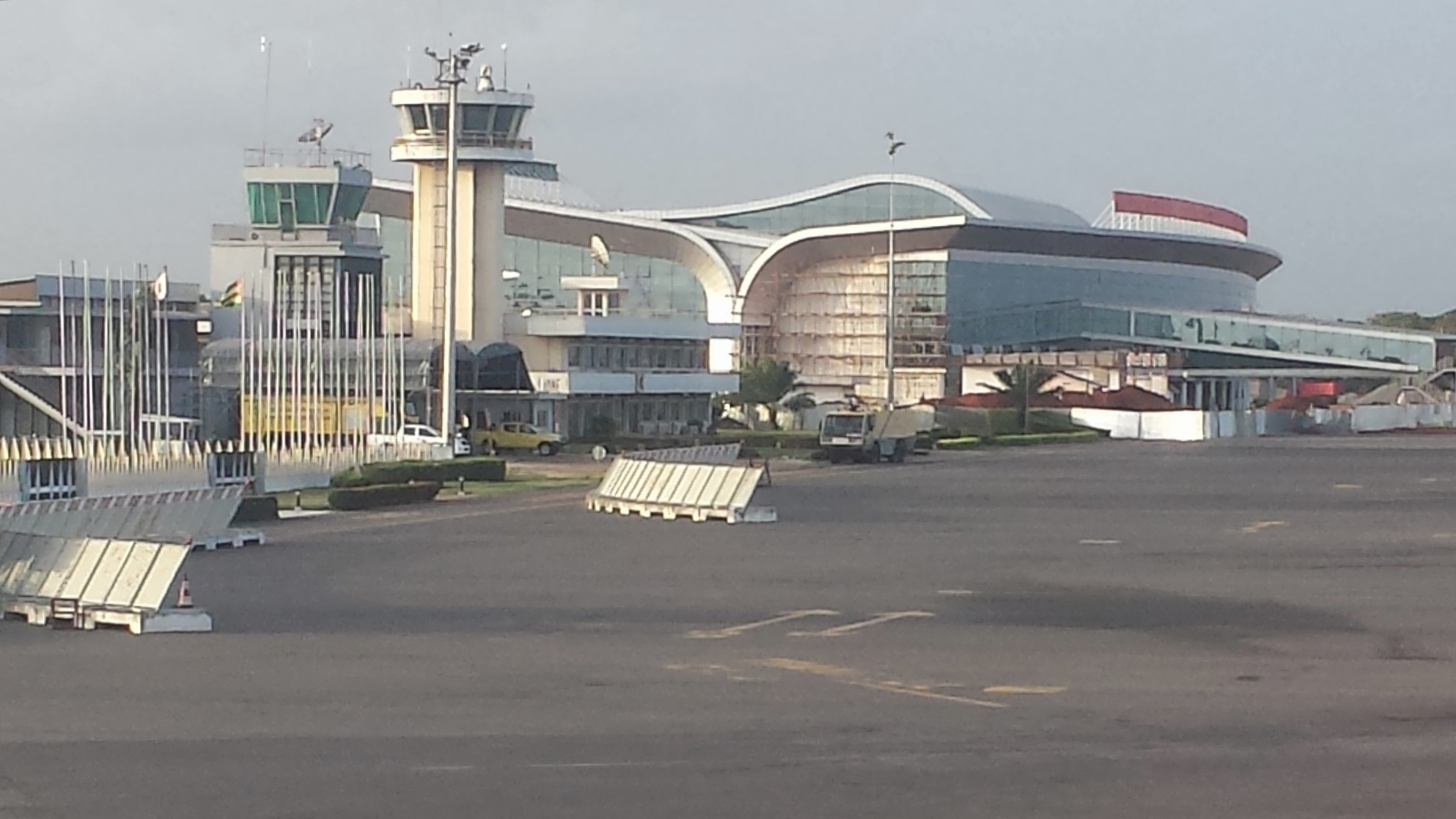
- IATA: LFW; ICAO: DXXX

Summary
- Airport type: Public/Military
- Serves: Lomé
- Location: Lomé, Togo
- Hub for: ASKY Airlines, Ethiopian Airlines
- Elevation AMSL: 72 ft (22 m)
- Coordinates: 06°09′56.2″N 01°15′16.24″E
- Website: aeroportdelome.com

Map
- Location of airport in Togo

Runways
Direction	Length		Surface
Direction	ft	m	Surface
04/22	9,843	3,000	Asphalt

Statistics (2014)
- Passengers: 616,800

Gnassingbé Eyadéma International Airport (IATA: LFW, ICAO: DXXX) (French: Aéroport international Gnassingbé Eyadéma), commonly known as Lomé–Tokoin International Airport, is an international airport serving Lomé, the capital of Togo. ASKY Airlines has its hub at the airport. The airport is named after Gnassingbé Eyadéma, the third President of Togo.

In 2014, the airport served 616,800 passengers. A new terminal at the airport opened in early 2016, with the capacity for up to 2 million passengers annually.

== Airlines and destinations ==
Airlines	Destinations
Air France	Paris–Charles de Gaulle
ASKY Airlines	Abidjan, Abuja, Accra, Bamako, Bangui, Banjul, Bissau, Brazzaville, Conakry, Cotonou, Dakar–Diass, Douala, Freetown, Kinshasa–N'Djili, Lagos, Libreville, Luanda–Neto, Malabo, Monrovia–Roberts, Nairobi–Jomo Kenyatta, N'Djamena, Niamey, Ouagadougou, Pointe-Noire, Praia, São Tomé, Yaoundé
Ethiopian Airlines	Addis Ababa, Newark, Washington–Dulles
Royal Air Maroc	Casablanca

== Statistics ==
Traffic by calendar year, official ACI statistics
	Passengers	Change from previous year	Aircraft operations	Change from previous year	Cargo (metric tons)	Change from previous year
2005	218,966	▼6.6%	9,496	▼4.6%	2,977	▼12.9%
2006	297,769	▲20.79%	12,101	▲26.5%	3,801	▲27.7%
2007	274,235	▼7.9%	14,875	▲23.9%	3,422	▼10.0%
2008	264,464	▼3.6%	13,562	▼8.8%	3,531	▲3.2%
2009	241,079	▼9.7%	10,400	▼30.4%	3,139	▲12.5%
2010	307,246	▲27.4%	9,252	▼11.0%	4,908	▲56.4%
2011	551,608	▲44.3%	8,983	▼3.0%	5,484	▲10.5%
2012	472,313	▼14.4%	7,256	▼19.2%	4,431	▼19.2%
2013	589,416	▲24.8%	6,413	▼11.6%	5,134	▲15.9%
2014	616,800	▲4.6%	9,670	▲50.8%	5,448	▲6.1%
2015	N/A	N/A	N/A	N/A	N/A	N/A
2016	758,784	N/A	N/A	N/A	N/A	N/A
2017	N/A	N/A	N/A	N/A	N/A	N/A
2018	N/A	N/A	N/A	N/A	N/A	N/A
2019	916,659	N/A	N/A	N/A	N/A	N/A
2020	459,961	▼49.8%	N/A	N/A	N/A	N/A
Sources: Airports Council International. World Airport Traffic Reports (Years 2005, 2006, 2007, 2011, 2012, 2013, and 2014); Togo First (Years 2019, 2020)

== Accidents and incidents ==
- 26 December 1974: A Grumman American G-1159 Gulfstream II (5V-TAA) of the Togolese government crashed on approach to Lome from Niamey, killing 3 of the 6 occupants (the 3 crew were killed, but all 3 passengers survived). The plane was returning from a flight carrying Nigerien president Seyni Kountche back to Niger. The presidential jet was a replacement for a Douglas C-47 lost in January 1974.
- 22 October 1977: a Lockheed L-749A-79-52 Constellation (N273R) of Lanzair, a stationary British cargo airline, was destroyed by fire.
- 2 February 2008: a Boeing 747-2D7B (N527MC) on Atlas Air Flight 14 (Lome-Amsterdam) had its cargo break loose during takeoff, breaking through the bulkhead and causing severe damage which led to the plane being written off.
