= 2010 Aéro-Service C-212 crash =

Passenger plane crash in Cameroon

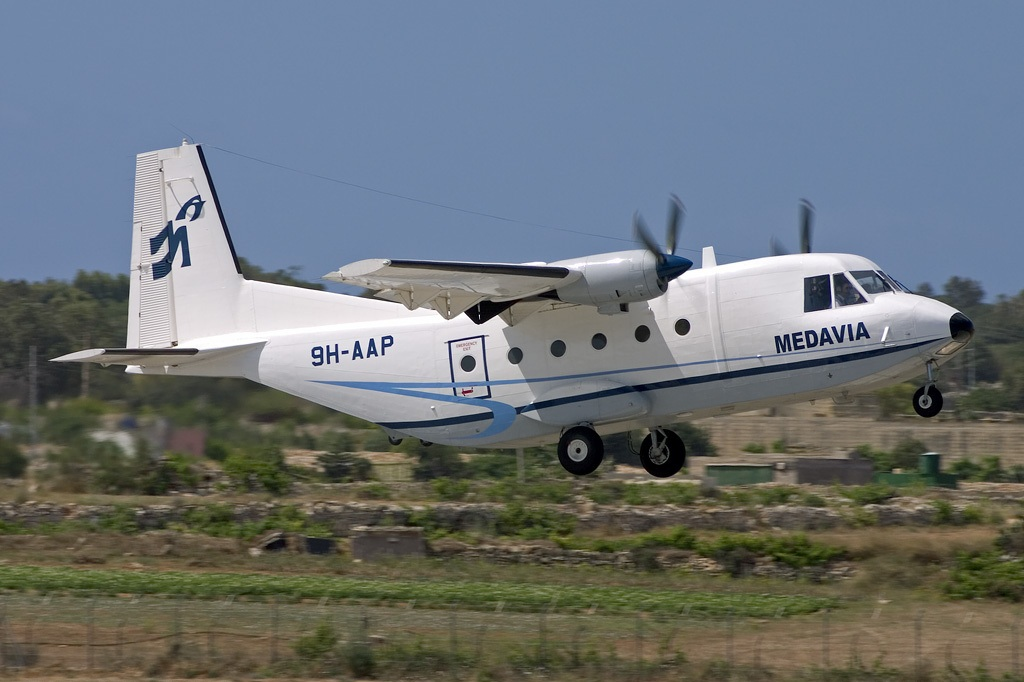
- An Aviocar similar to the accident aircraft

Accident
- Date: 19 June 2010
- Summary: Under investigation
- Site: Near Dima, South Region, Cameroon; 2°28′43″N 13°26′50″E

Aircraft
- Aircraft type: CASA C-212 Aviocar
- Operator: Aéro-Service
- Registration: TN-AFA
- Flight origin: Yaoundé Airport, Yaoundé, Cameroon
- Destination: Yangadou, Republic of the Congo
- Occupants: 11
- Passengers: 9
- Crew: 2
- Fatalities: 11
- Survivors: 0

On 19 June 2010, a CASA C-212 Aviocar transport aircraft crashed on a flight from Yaoundé, Cameroon, to Yangadou, Republic of the Congo, killing all eleven people on board. Among the victims were the entire board of Australian mining conglomerate Sundance Resources, including mining executive Ken Talbot.

== Accident ==
On 19 June 2010, Cam Iron – Sundance's Cameroon subsidiary – chartered a CASA C-212 Aviocar from Aéro-Service to fly their board members from Yaoundé, the capital of Cameroon, to the remote mining town of Yangadou, Republic of the Congo. The Aviocar was chartered because the company's private jet was too large to operate into the destination airfield.

The aircraft departed from Yaoundé Airport at 09:13 (Note: All times are local times, which are UTC+1.) and contact was last made with the aircraft at 09:51. The aircraft was scheduled to arrive at Yangadou at 10:20.

A search for the aircraft was carried out by the French Military, and the Cameroon Government, using a Transall C-160 and a Eurocopter AS532 Cougar helicopter. The search was hampered by local fog. The wreckage of the aircraft was found on 22 June at Dima, 30 kilometres (19 mi) short of its destination and near the regional capital Djoum, Cameroon. There were no survivors among the eleven people on board.

== Aircraft ==
The aircraft involved was CASA C-212 Aviocar registered TN-AFA. It was operated by Aéro-Service an airline that is banned from operating in the European Union due to safety concerns.

== Victims ==
The victims were of various nationalities, and included mining magnate Ken Talbot.

| Nationality | Crew | Passengers | Total |
|---|---|---|---|
| Australia | | 6 | 6 |
| France | 1 | 1 | 2 |
| United Kingdom | 1 | 1 | 2 |
| United States | | 1 | 1 |
| Total | 2 | 9 | 11 |
