= Aircraft Accident Investigation Bureau (Republic of the Congo) =

The Aircraft Accident Investigation Bureau (French: Bureau d'Enquêtes et des Accidents d'Aviation, BEA Congo) is the aircraft accident and incident investigation agency of the Republic of the Congo. Its head office is on the property of Maya Maya Airport in Brazzaville. It is an agency of the Ministry of Transport, Civil Aviation, and Merchant Marine.

It was created by decree # 2011–732, issued on 6 December 2011.

In 2022 the agency signed a memorandum of understanding with the Civil Security Command.

== See also ==
- Agence nationale de l'aviation civile (Republic of the Congo)
