= Príncipe Airport =

Airport in São Tomé and Príncipe

Príncipe Airport Aeroporto de Príncipe
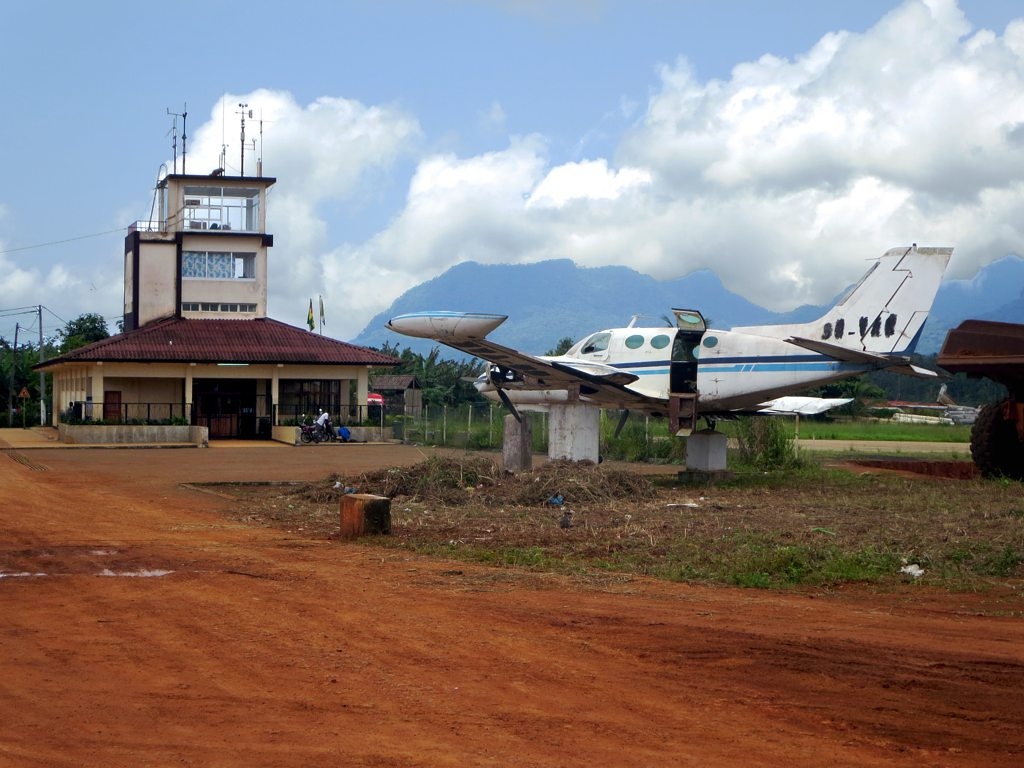
- IATA: PCP; ICAO: FPPR

Summary
- Airport type: Public
- Serves: Príncipe Island, São Tomé and Príncipe
- Elevation AMSL: 591 ft (180 m)
- Coordinates: 01°39′46″N 007°24′42″E

Map
- Location of airport in São Tomé and Príncipe

Runways
Direction	Length		Surface
Direction	m	ft	Surface
18/36	1,750	5,741	19mm seal with slurry (Cape Seal)
- Source: DAFIF

Príncipe Airport (IATA: PCP, ICAO: FPPR) is an airport on the island of Príncipe, located 3 kilometres (2 mi) north of Santo António, the island's capital. It is the only airport on Príncipe and one of the three airports serving São Tomé and Príncipe. It was built in 1968 during Portuguese colonial rule. The only commercial flights available are to São Tomé International Airport in the capital, but private and charter flights are also available.

East of the airport is the settlement of Aeroporto named after the airport.

== Airlines and destinations ==
Airlines	Destinations
Afrijet	São Tomé
STP Airways	São Tomé

== Renovations ==
In 2012, the Portuguese construction firm Mota-Engil was hired to modernize the airport. The main focus was on lengthening the runway to allow it to accommodate mid-size jets. Although regional President José Cardoso Cassandra originally announced the work would be completed within 17 months, it was not finished until October 2015. The renovations were funded by a $18 million investment by a South African firm, which also involved the construction of a five-star eco-tourism hotel on the island.

== Facilities ==
The airport resides at an elevation of 591 feet (180 m) above mean sea level. It has 1 runway designated 18/36 with an asphalt surface. Prior to the 2012 renovations, it measured 1,320 by 30 metres (4,331 ft × 98 ft), but it has since been lengthened to 1,750 metres (5,740 ft). Unlike the airport in São Tomé, the airport in Príncipe is not certified for Instrument Flight Rules. The airport does have customs facilities, but there are no commercial international flights into Príncipe, so the facilities are only for passengers arriving on charter and private flights.
