= Gabon Express =

Airline of Gabon

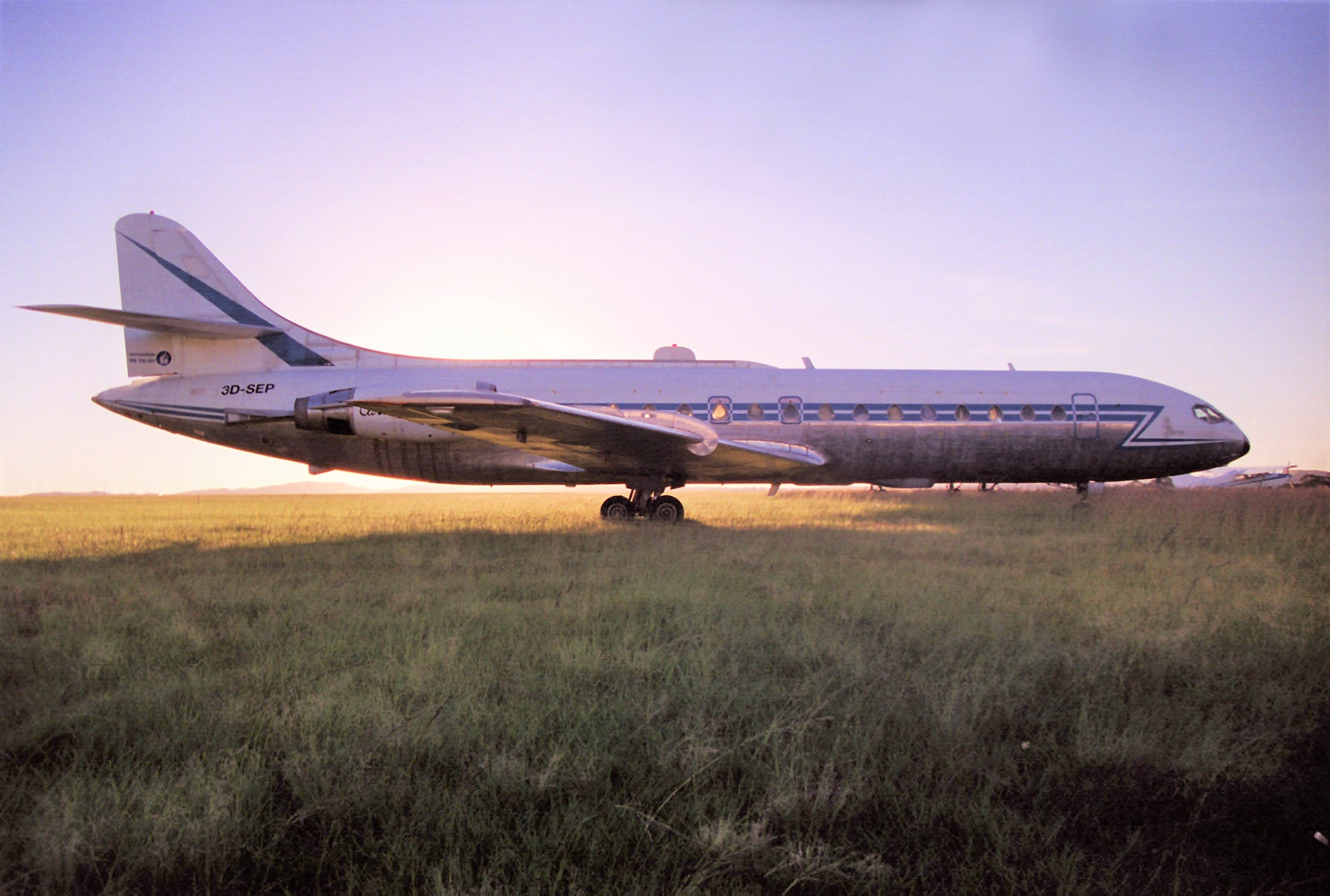
- Gabon Express Sud Aviation Caravelle
IATA	ICAO	Call sign
—	GBE	GABEX Sign
- Commenced operations: 26 October 1998
- Ceased operations: 15 June 2004
- Operating bases: Libreville International Airport
- Fleet size: See Fleet below
- Destinations: See Services below
- Headquarters: Libreville, Gabon

Gabon Express was an airline based in Libreville, Gabon. It operated scheduled passenger services and passenger and cargo charters. It ceased operations in June 2004.

== History ==
The airline was established in 1998 and started operations on 26 October 1998 between Libreville and Port-Gentil. The airline operated both Caravelle and HS 748 Aircraft. It grew to become the second largest airline in Gabon, operating 60 scheduled flights a week from Libreville. The airline's operations were suspended following the crash of one of its aircraft on 8 June 2004. Operations ceased on 15 June 2004.

At the time the airline ceased operations, it was the only airline still operating Caravelle aircraft in scheduled passenger services.

== Accidents and incidents ==
- On June 8, 2004, a Gabon Express flight using a Hawker Siddeley HS 748 Series 2A, departed from Libreville for a scheduled passenger flight to Franceville. Engine problems forced the crew to turn back for Libreville but the aircraft crashed 100 m offshore. Of the 30 people on board, 19 of them were killed. The Gabonese government proposed legal action against the company and banned it from operating, claiming it had failed to insure its aircraft.

== Fleet ==
Over the years, Gabon Express operated the following aircraft types:

- 3 – Hawker Siddeley HS 748
- 2 – Grumman Gulfstream I
- 2 – Sud Aviation Caravelle
- 1 – Fokker F27
- 1 – NAMC YS-11
