= Amelia (airline) =

French airline

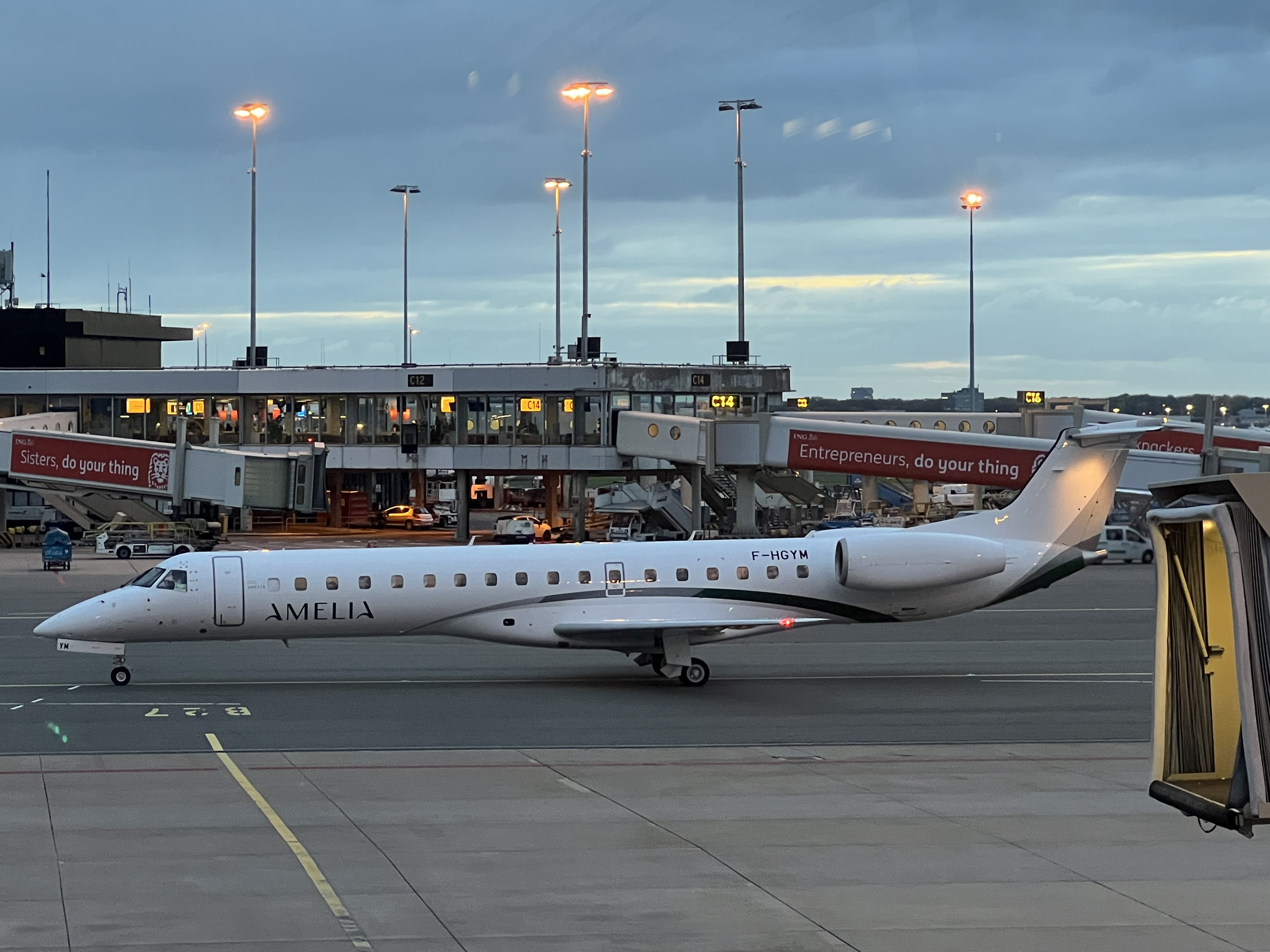
- Embraer E145
IATA	ICAO	Call sign
8R	AIA	AMELIA
- Founded: 1976; 50 years ago
- Fleet size: 6
- Headquarters: Paris, France
- Key people: Alain Regourd (CEO)
- Employees: 250
- Website: flyamelia.com/en/

Amelia is a French airline which originated from Regourd Aviation Group in 2019. The company specialises in wet leasing aircraft, charter flights, sport teams transport, corporate transport, crew transport and aircraft maintenance. Amelia also operates Public Service Obligation flights in Europe.

== History ==
Regourd Aviation Group was founded in 1976 by Alain Regourd. In 2019 gave life to Amelia as a tribute to American aviation pioneer Amelia Earhart. Flight operations started on 12 July 2019. Regourd Aviation now only acts as a holding company which owns Slovenian subsidiary Amelia International (formerly Aero4M) and African subsidiaries Equaflight (EKA), EquaJet (EK), and Equa2R.

In March 2022, it was announced that Amelia would take over the Public Service Obligation (PSO) routes from Strasbourg to Munich and Amsterdam Schiphol on 9 April 2022.

== Codeshare and interline agreements ==
Amelia currently has a codeshare agreement with Air France and an interline agreement with APG Airlines.

== Fleet ==
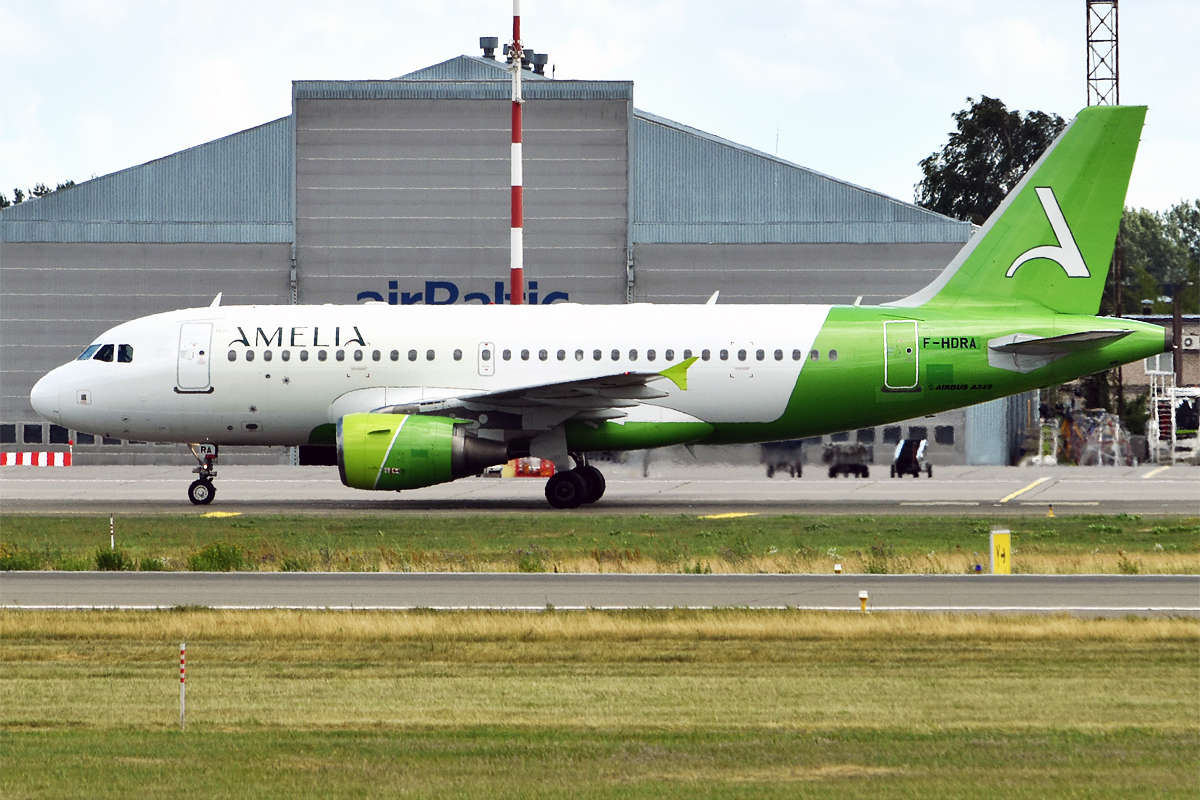
Airbus A319-100

As of March 2026, Amelia operates the following aircraft:

Aircraft	In service	Passengers	Notes
Airbus A319-100	2	144/60	1 in 60 seat executive configuration
Airbus A320-200	4	178	
Embraer E190	2	98	1 Operated for Aerovias DAP and SilverSea Cruises
Embraer E145	8	50	
Total	16		
