= Léon-Mba International Airport =

Airport in Libreville, Gabon

Léon-Mba International Airport Aéroport international Léon-Mba
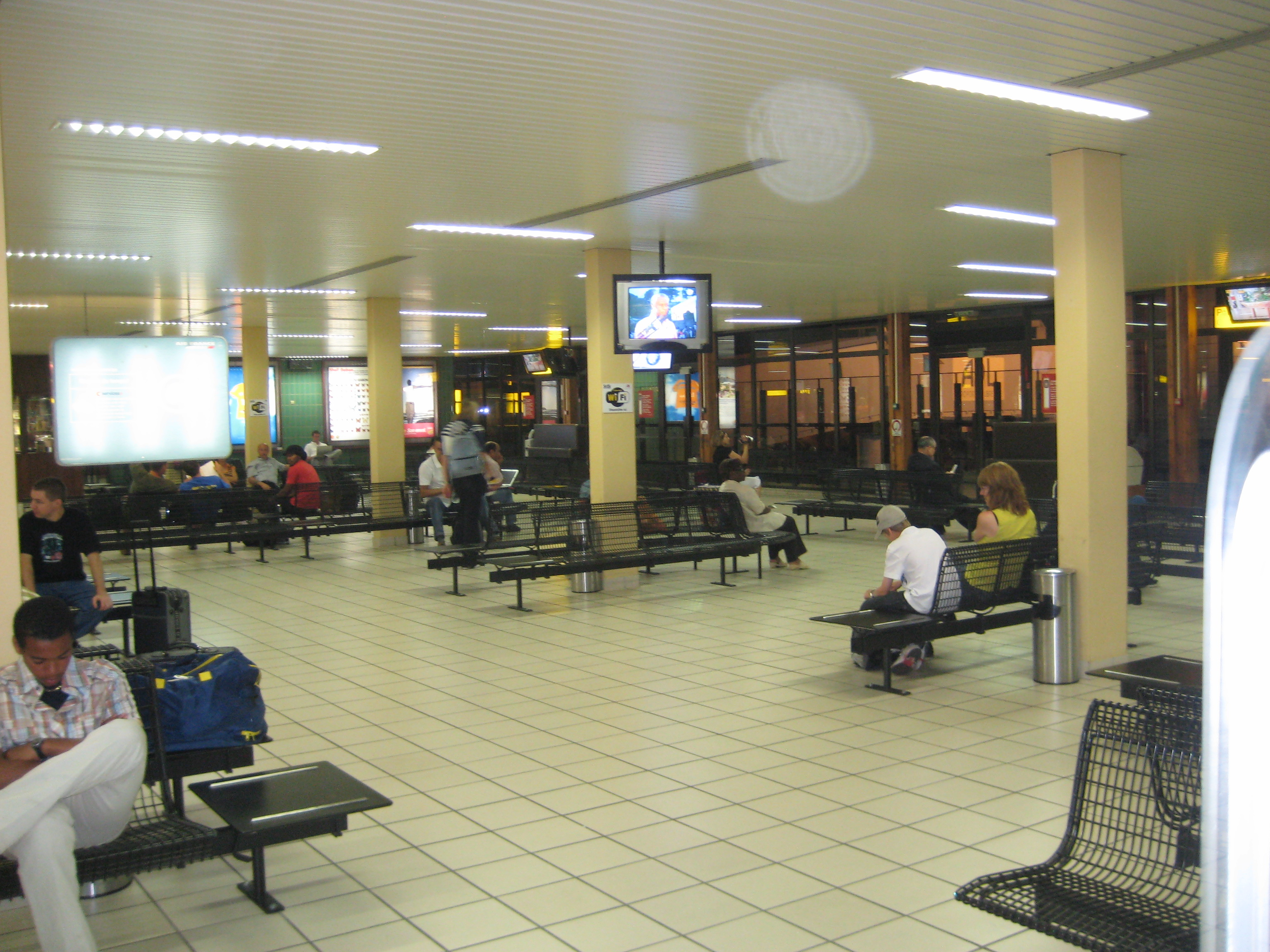
- IATA: LBV; ICAO: FOOL

Summary
- Airport type: Public and military
- Operator: Handling Partners Gabon
- Serves: Libreville
- Location: Libreville, Gabon
- Hub for: Nationale Regionale Transport
- Elevation AMSL: 39 ft (12 m)
- Coordinates: 00°27′31″N 009°24′44″E
- Website: www.libreville-aeroport.com

Map
- Location of Airport in Gabon LBV (Africa)

Runways
Direction	Length		Surface
Direction	m	ft	Surface
16/34	3,000	9,844	Asphalt

Statistics (2009)
- Passengers: 721,411
- Source: DAFIF

Léon-Mba International Airport (IATA: LBV, ICAO: FOOL, French: Aéroport international Léon-Mba) is an international airport serving Libreville, the capital and the largest city Gabon. Constructed in the 1950s, it is the main international airport in the country.

== Airlines and destinations ==
=== Passenger ===
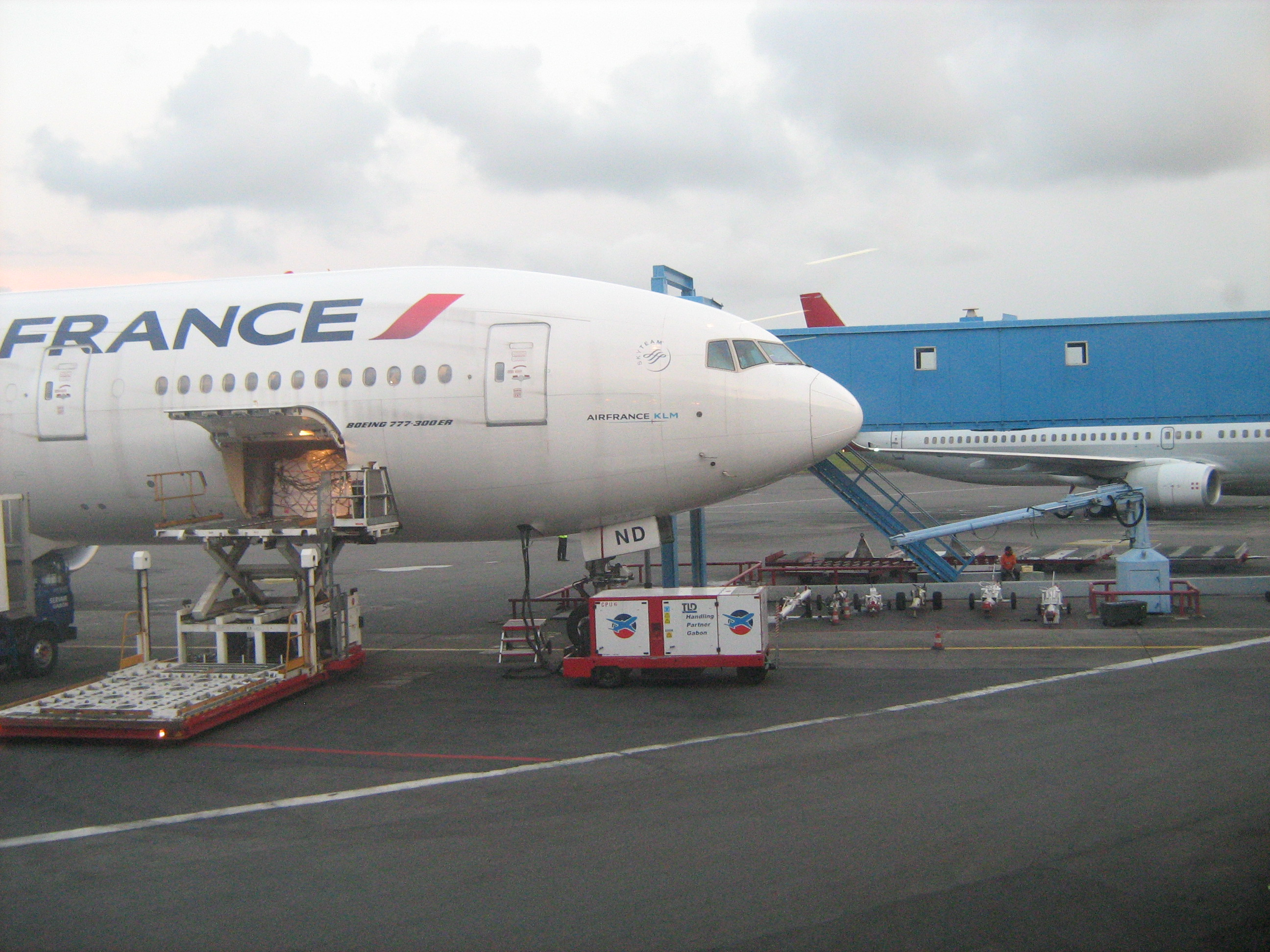
Air France Boeing 777 arrived from Charles de Gaulle Airport, France.

Airlines	Destinations
AfriJet	Bangui, Brazzaville, Cotonou, Douala, Franceville, Oyem, Pointe-Noire, Port Gentil, Príncipe, São Tomé, Yaoundé
Air Algérie	Algiers,
Air Côte d'Ivoire	Abidjan, Brazzaville, Cotonou, Lagos, Pointe-Noire
Air France	Paris–Charles de Gaulle
ASKY Airlines	Douala, Johannesburg–OR Tambo, Kinshasa–N'djili, Lomé, São Tomé, Yaoundé
Camair-co	Cotonou, Douala, Pointe-Noire, Yaoundé
FlyGabon	Johannesburg–OR Tambo
Ethiopian Airlines	Addis Ababa, Malabo
Nationale Regionale Transport	Franceville, Koulamoutou, Makokou, Mouila, Oyem, Port-Gentil, Tchibanga
Royal Air Maroc	Casablanca
RwandAir	Douala, Kigali, Yaoundé
Trans Air Congo	Douala, Pointe-Noire
Turkish Airlines	Istanbul, Luanda, Pointe-Noire (all flights suspended)

=== Cargo ===
Airlines	Destinations
Cargolux	Luxembourg
DHL Aviation	Abidjan, Franceville, Port-Gentil
Ethiopian Cargo	Abidjan, Addis Ababa
Royal Air Maroc Cargo	Addis Ababa, Casablanca

== Accidents and incidents ==
- On 2 April 1977, an Aviogenex (Yugoslavia) Tupolev Tu-134 registered YU-AJS, crashed on landing, killing the eight crew on board.
- On 8 June 2004, a Gabon Express twin-engine Hawker Siddeley HS 748 operating Gabon Express Flight 221 ditched into the Gulf of Guinea after suffering an engine failure and hydraulic problems shortly after take-off, leading to the deaths of 19 out of the 30 onboard.
- On 6 June 2011, Antonov An-26 TR-LII of Solenta Aviation, operating Flight 122A for DHL Aviation ditched in the sea near Libreville International Airport. Four people on board were rescued and transported to a local hospital, but were not seriously injured. The crew reported hydraulic problems and eyewitnesses stated that the aircraft's propellers were not turning at the time of the ditching.

== See also ==
- List of airports in Gabon
- Transport in Gabon
