= Tchibanga =

- Coat of arms

- Location in Gabon
- Coordinates: 2°56′0″S 11°0′0″E
- Country: Gabon
- Province: Nyanga Province

Population (2008)
  - Total: 24,000

Tchibanga is a city in the Nyanga Province of southern Gabon, situated on the Nyanga River. It has an estimated population of 24,000 (2008). The town lies on the N6 road and is home to Tchibanga Airport and a market. It lies near the Ivela Falls.

Tchibanga is the capital of the Nyanga province. Tchibanga is home to approximately 15,000 Gabonese people, but is also home to a sizeable refugee population from Congo-Brazzaville. The UNHCR runs an office there providing services for the refugees and locals. The majority of people living in Tchibanga, including most Congolese refugees, belong to the Bapounou ethnic group.

Tchibanga sits on the banks of the Nyanga River. It is located in Gabon's southern grassland region and does not have the deep jungle environment of many Gabonese cities. Tchibanga has a thriving commercial district, a hospital, two high schools, a post office, a large Catholic church, and an airport. A small power station and a fresh water spring provide electricity and running water to the centre of town. President Omar Bongo has a summer house in Tchibanga that he has never used. The Minister of the Interior also has a house there.

Tchibanga is accessible by a twelve-hour bush taxi ride from Libreville or by aircraft to Tchibanga Airport. A local green and white taxi costs approximately 200 CFA francs.

Tchibanga has a number of restaurants serving both Western and traditional food. Some restaurants serve bushmeat, including snake and antelope in a traditional palm oil sauce called Nyengui. Tchibanga is known for having the best manioc (cassava) in Gabon. Batons, or sticks of manioc wrapped in leaves, may be purchased for 100 Central African Francs at the market. A wide variety of other local produce is available at the market, including locally grown bananas, peanuts and hot peppers; the markets often sell bushmeat, such as antelope and monkey. Tchibanga is also a good place to buy traditional woven goods, including mats and baskets.

== Notable people ==
- Annie-Flore Batchiellilys (born 1967), Gabonese singer, musician, and composer

== Climate ==
Tchibanga has a tropical savanna climate (Köppen climate classification Aw), typical of this region of west-central Africa and not dissimilar to Kinshasa or Pointe-Noire. Unlike most places with a tropical savanna climate, the dry season from June to September is exceedingly foggy and sunless due to the influence of the cold Benguela Current. In fact, with only about 1,260 hours of sunshine per year, Tchibanga is one of the least sunny places in Africa and receives less sunshine than such cities as London or Juneau.

Climate data for Tchibanga (1961-1990)
| Month | Jan | Feb | Mar | Apr | May | Jun | Jul | Aug | Sep | Oct | Nov | Dec | Year |
|---|---|---|---|---|---|---|---|---|---|---|---|---|---|
| Mean daily maximum °C (°F) | 31.2 (88.2) | 31.9 (89.4) | 32.5 (90.5) | 32.7 (90.9) | 31.4 (88.5) | 28.8 (83.8) | 27.8 (82.0) | 26.7 (80.1) | 28.8 (83.8) | 30.3 (86.5) | 30.5 (86.9) | 30.5 (86.9) | 30.3 (86.5) |
| Daily mean °C (°F) | 26.8 (80.2) | 27.1 (80.8) | 27.5 (81.5) | 27.7 (81.9) | 26.8 (80.2) | 24.3 (75.7) | 23.3 (73.9) | 22.8 (73.0) | 25.0 (77.0) | 26.3 (79.3) | 26.4 (79.5) | 26.4 (79.5) | 25.9 (78.6) |
| Mean daily minimum °C (°F) | 22.3 (72.1) | 22.3 (72.1) | 22.5 (72.5) | 22.6 (72.7) | 22.2 (72.0) | 19.8 (67.6) | 18.7 (65.7) | 18.8 (65.8) | 21.1 (70.0) | 22.3 (72.1) | 22.2 (72.0) | 22.3 (72.1) | 21.4 (70.5) |
| Average precipitation mm (inches) | 176.2 (6.94) | 169.9 (6.69) | 205.9 (8.11) | 200.6 (7.90) | 104.7 (4.12) | 5.5 (0.22) | 0.1 (0.00) | 0.3 (0.01) | 6.0 (0.24) | 127.9 (5.04) | 272.5 (10.73) | 171.6 (6.76) | 1,441.2 (56.74) |
| Average precipitation days | 13.6 | 14.5 | 16.2 | 14.8 | 7.0 | 0.7 | 0.2 | 0.4 | 2.1 | 14.1 | 20.3 | 15.1 | 119.0 |
| Average relative humidity (%) | 81 | 80 | 79 | 80 | 81 | 80 | 78 | 78 | 77 | 79 | 81 | 82 | 80 |
| Mean monthly sunshine hours | 137.2 | 137.5 | 146.6 | 144.8 | 116.9 | 77.5 | 80.1 | 58.9 | 43.2 | 87.9 | 112.6 | 115.0 | 1,258.2 |
Source: NOAA
