= Mouila Airport =

Mouila Ville Airport Aéroport de Mouila
- IATA: MJL; ICAO: FOGM

Summary
- Owner: Government
- Serves: Mouila, Gabon
- Elevation AMSL: 283 ft / 86 m
- Coordinates: 1°50′53″S 11°03′28″E

Map
- Location within Gabon

Runways
Direction	Length		Surface
Direction	m	ft	Surface
17/35	1,800	5,906	Asphalt
- Sources: Google Maps GCM

Mouila Ville Airport (French: Aéroport de Mouila) (IATA: MJL, ICAO: FOGM) is an airport serving the town of Mouila, in Ngounié Province, Gabon.

The Mouila Ville non-directional beacon (Ident: ML) is located 7 kilometres (4.3 mi) north of the field.

== Airlines and destinations ==
Airlines	Destinations
Nationale Regionale Transport	Libreville

== See also ==
- List of airports in Gabon
- Transport in Gabon
