= Makokou Airport =

Airport in Ogooué-Ivindo Province, Gabon

Makokou Airport Aéroport Makokou
- IATA: MKU; ICAO: FOOK

Summary
- Airport type: Public
- Location: Makokou
- Elevation AMSL: 1,726 ft (526 m)
- Coordinates: 0°34′45″N 12°53′25″E

Map
- Location in Gabon

Runways
Direction	Length		Surface
Direction	m	ft	Surface
07/25	1,910	6,266	Asphalt
- Sources: DAFIF GCM Google Maps

Makokou Airport (French: Aéroport Makokou) (IATA: MKU, ICAO: FOOK) is an airport serving Makokou, Ogooué-Ivindo Province, Gabon. The runway is 4 kilometres (2.5 mi) northeast of town.

The Makokou non-directional beacon (Ident: KO) is located on the field.

== Airlines and destinations ==
Airlines	Destinations
Nationale Regionale Transport	Libreville

== See also ==
- List of airports in Gabon
- Transport in Gabon
