= Agence nationale de l'aviation civile (Republic of the Congo) =

Civil aviation authority of the Republic of the Congo

Agence nationale de l'aviation civile (ANAC Congo) is the civil aviation authority of the Republic of the Congo, headquartered in Camp Clairon in Brazzaville.

It was created in 1978. As of 2015 the director is Serge Florent Dzota.

== See also ==
- Aircraft Accident Investigation Bureau (Republic of the Congo)
