= São Tomé International Airport =

Airport in São Tomé and Príncipe

São Tomé International Airport Aeroporto Internacional de São Tomé
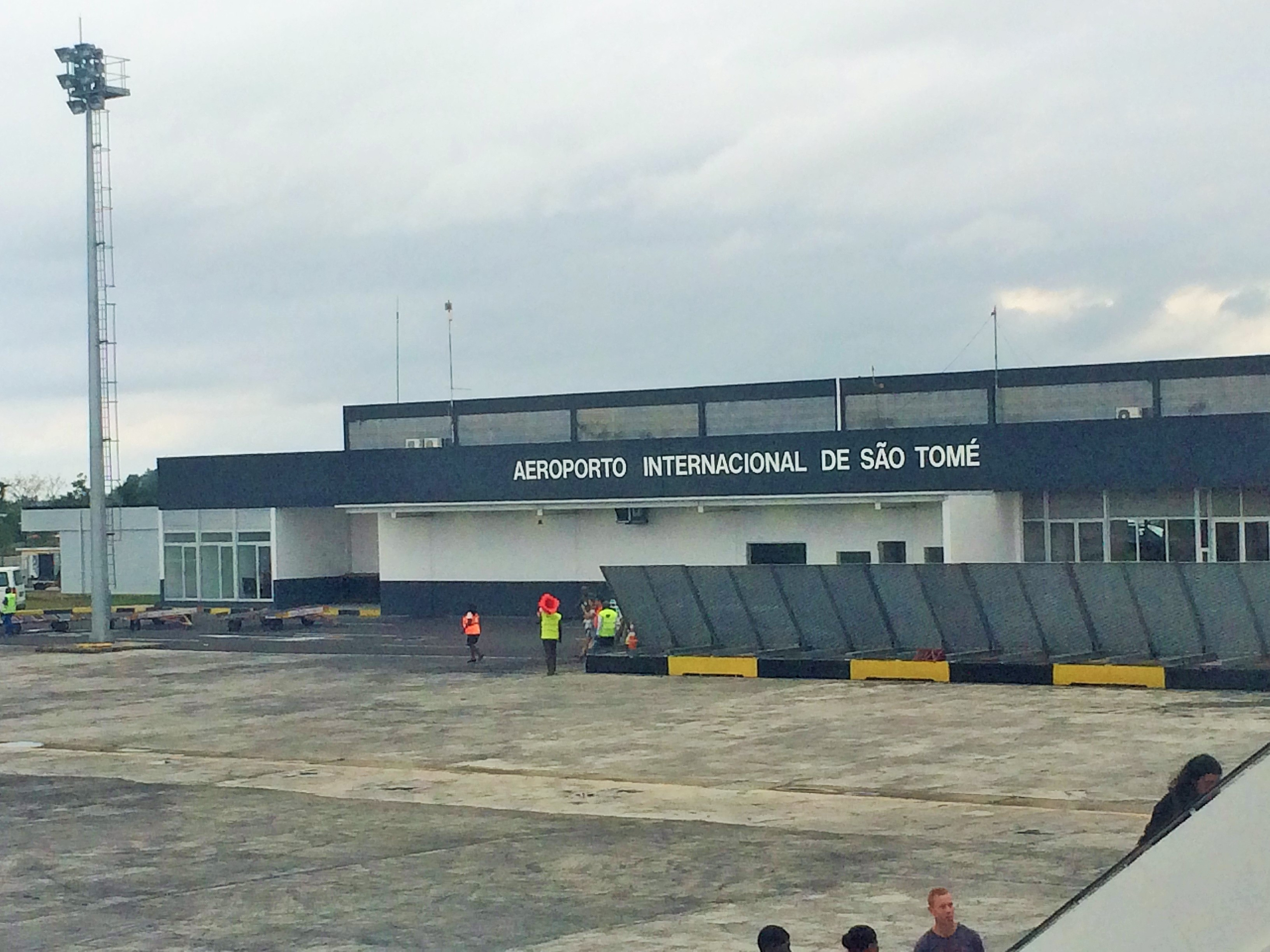
- IATA: TMS; ICAO: FPST

Summary
- Airport type: Public
- Serves: São Tomé, São Tomé Island, São Tomé and Príncipe
- Elevation AMSL: 33 ft (10 m)
- Coordinates: 00°22′41″N 006°42′44″E

Map
- Location of airport in São Tomé and Príncipe

Runways
Direction	Length		Surface
Direction	m	ft	Surface
11/29	2,220	7,283	Asphalt
- Source: DAFIF

São Tomé International Airport (Portuguese: Aeroporto Internacional de São Tomé) (IATA: TMS, ICAO: FPST) is an international airport located on São Tomé Island, 5 kilometres (3 mi) from the city of São Tomé. It is the main airport serving São Tomé and Príncipe.

== Facilities ==
The airport is at an elevation of 33 feet (10 m) above mean sea level. It has one runway designated 11/29 with an asphalt surface measuring 2,220 by 45 metres (7,283 ft × 148 ft).

== History ==
During the 1967–70 secession war from Nigeria (Nigerian Civil War), the airport served as the major base of operations for the Biafran airlift. The airlift was an international humanitarian relief effort (the largest civilian airlift to date) that transported food and medicine to eastern Nigeria. It is estimated to have saved more than a million lives.

== Airlines and destinations ==
Airlines	Destinations
Afrijet	Libreville, Príncipe
ASKY Airlines	Libreville, Lomé
STP Airways	Lisbon, Príncipe
TAAG Angola Airlines	Luanda–Agostinho Neto
TAP Air Portugal	Accra, Lisbon

== Incidents and accidents ==
- On 22 November 1962, Douglas C-54D-10-DC 7502 of the Portuguese Air Force crashed shortly after take-off for Portela Airport, Lisbon, Portugal, killing 22 of the 37 people on board.
- On 15 May 1979: A Lockheed L-100-20 Hercules, registration D2-FAF, of TAAG Angola Airlines crashed on landing at São Tomé International Airport. There were no fatalities.
- On 29 July 2017, Antonov An-74TK100 UR-CKC of CAVOK Air crashed on take-off and was damaged beyond repair. A birdstrike was reported and the aircraft overran the end of the runway whilst attempting to abort the take-off.
