= Tchibanga Airport =

Tchibanga Airport Aéroport de Tchibanga
- IATA: TCH; ICAO: FOOT

Summary
- Owner: Government
- Location: Tchibanga, Gabon
- Elevation AMSL: 269 ft (82 m)
- Coordinates: 2°53′15″S 10°57′20″E

Map
- Location within Gabon

Runways
Direction	Length		Surface
Direction	m	ft	Surface
15/33	2,000	6,562	Asphalt
- Sources: Bing Maps GCM

Tchibanga Airport (French: Aéroport de Tchibanga) (IATA: TCH, ICAO: FOOT) is an airport serving the city of Tchibanga, in the Nyanga Province of Gabon. The runway is 5 kilometres (3.1 mi) northwest of the city.

The Tchibanga non-directional beacon (Ident: TC) is located on the field.

== Airlines and destinations ==
Airlines	Destinations
Nationale Regionale Transport	Libreville

== See also ==
- List of airports in Gabon
- Transport in Gabon
