= National Airways Gabon =

Airline of Gabon

IATA	ICAO	Call sign
-	-	-
- Commenced operations: 2001
- Ceased operations: 2009
- Fleet size: See Fleet below
- Headquarters: Libreville, Gabon

National Airways Gabon was an airline based in Libreville, Gabon. It operated passenger services. It was established and started operations in 2001, and rebranded in 2009 as Nationale Regionale Transport.

== Fleet ==
As of January 2005, the National Airways Gabon fleet included:

- 1 Fokker F27 Mk300
