= TCH (chemotherapy) =

- Specialty: Oncology

TCH is a chemotherapy regimen consisting of Taxotere (docetaxel), carboplatin and Herceptin (trastuzumab), which is used to treat breast cancer. TCHP is a variation that adds pertuzumab.
