= Koulamoutou Airport =

Airport in Koulamoutou, Ogooué-Lolo, Gabon

Koulamoutou Airport (Koula Moutou Airport) Aéroport de Koula Moutou
- IATA: KOU; ICAO: FOGK

Summary
- Airport type: Public
- Location: Koulamoutou, Gabon
- Elevation AMSL: 1,070 ft (330 m)
- Coordinates: 01°11′04″S 012°26′28″E

Map
- Location of Koulamoutou Airport in Gabon

Runways
Direction	Length		Surface
Direction	m	ft	Surface
15/33	1,780	5,841	Asphalt
- Source: DAFIF GCM Google Maps

Koulamoutou Airport or Koula Moutou Airport (French: Aéroport de Koulamotou) (IATA: KOU, ICAO: FOGK) is an airport serving Koulamoutou, the capital of the Ogooué-Lolo Province in central Gabon.

The Koulamoutou non-directional beacon (Ident:KL) is located just north of the runway.

== Facilities ==
The airport resides at an elevation of 1,070 feet (326 m) above mean sea level. It has one runway designated 15/33 with an asphalt surface measuring 1,780 by 45 metres (5,840 ft × 148 ft).

== Airlines and destinations ==
Airlines	Destinations
Nationale Regionale Transport	Libreville

== See also ==
- List of airports in Gabon
- Transport in Gabon
