= AfriJet =

Gabonese airline

Afrijet Business Service
IATA	ICAO	Call sign
J7	ABS	AFRIJET
- Founded: 2004
- Hubs: Léon-Mba International Airport
- Frequent-flyer program: Le CLUB
- Fleet size: 8
- Destinations: 12
- Headquarters: Libreville, Gabon
- Website: flyafrijet.online/en

Afrijet Business Service is a Gabonese airline operating scheduled service to a number of airports throughout Cameroon, Gabon, and São Tomé, as well as the Republic of the Congo.

== History ==
Afrijet was founded in 2004 by a group of private investors, initially flying private charters using Falcon 900 aircraft. In 2016, Afrijet commenced scheduled domestic flights throughout Gabon, and have since expanded to neighboring countries.

On 9 December 2021, AfriJet announced it had partnered with La Compagnie to launch seasonal flights between Paris Orly and Libreville's Léon-Mba International Airport from 16 December 2021

AfriJet is looking towards the future of sustainable aviation. At the 54th Paris Air Show on June 21, 2023, the airline signed a Memorandum of Understanding with AURA AERO, a French aircraft manufacturer, for the 19-seater ERA, an electric regional aircraft expected to enter commercial service before 2030.

== Destinations ==
As of September 2020, Afrijet serves the following destinations:

Country	City/Locality	Airport	Notes
Cameroon	Yaounde	Yaoundé Nsimalen International Airport	
Gabon	Franceville	M'Vengue El Hadj Omar Bongo Ondimba International Airport	
Gabon	Libreville	Léon-Mba International Airport	Hub
Gabon	Port Gentil	Port-Gentil International Airport	
Republic of the Congo	Brazzaville	Maya-Maya Airport	
Republic of the Congo	Pointe-Noire	Pointe Noire Airport	
São Tomé	São Tomé	São Tomé International Airport	

=== Interline agreements ===
- APG Airlines

== Fleet ==
=== Current fleet ===
As of August 2025, AfriJet operates the following aircraft:

Afrijet Fleet
Aircraft	In service	Orders	Passengers				Notes
Aircraft	In service	Orders	C	Y+	Y	Total	Notes
ATR 42-500	1	—	—	—			
ATR 72-500	1	—	—	—			
ATR 72-600	6	—	—	—			
Total	8	—					

=== Former fleet ===
AfriJet Business service previously operated the following aircraft:

- 1 ATR 42-300
