= Trans Air Congo =

Airline of the Republic of the Congo

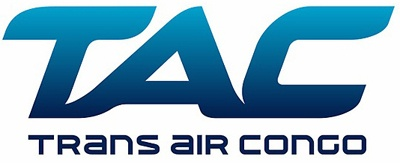
IATA	ICAO	Call sign
Q8	TSG	TRANS-AIR-CONGO
- Founded: 24 August 1994; 32 years ago
- Hubs: Brazzaville; Pointe–Noire
- Frequent-flyer program: MilesPlus
- Fleet size: 2
- Destinations: 5
- Headquarters: Pointe-Noire, Republic of the Congo
- Website: www.flytransaircongo.com

Trans Air Congo (TAC) is an airline based at Pointe Noire Airport in Pointe-Noire, Republic of the Congo. It is banned from flying into EU airspace.

== History ==
The company was established on 24 August 1994 by the El-Hage family and started services with a single Let 410 aircraft. Early services were largely between Brazzaville and Pointe Noire. In December 1994 an Antonov An-24 joined the fleet, followed in 1996 by a Boeing 727-200 and Yakovlev Yak-42. Late 1997 saw the airline having to move temporarily to Johannesburg in South Africa to avoid a civil war.

== Destinations ==
Trans Air Congo operates services to the following destinations:

- Domestic scheduled destinations: Brazzaville and Pointe Noire.
- International scheduled destinations: Cotonou, Douala, Libreville, and Abidjan

== Fleet ==
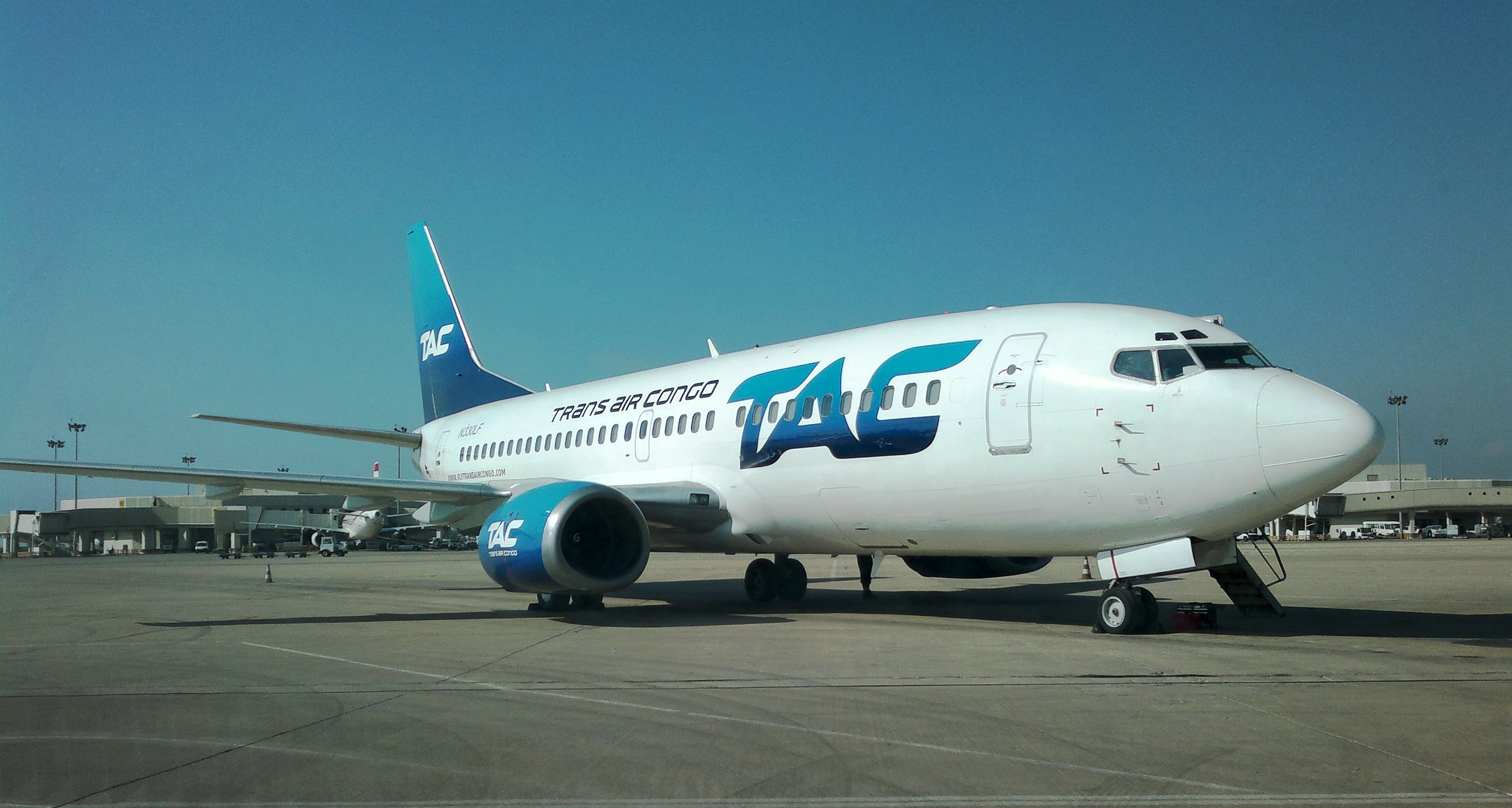
Trans Air Congo Boeing 737-300

=== Current fleet ===
As of July 2026, Trans Air Congo operates the following aircraft:

Trans Air Congo Fleet
Aircraft	In Service	Orders	Passengers	Notes
Boeing 737-300	2	0	148	
Total	2	0		

=== Former fleet ===
As of August 2025, Trans Air Congo operated 3 Boeing 737-300 and 1 Boeing 737-500

The airline also previously operated the following aircraft:

- 1 Boeing 727-200
- 5 Boeing 737-200
- 3 Boeing 737-300
- 2 Boeing 737-500
- 1 McDonnell Douglas MD-82
- 2 Embraer EMB 120 Brasilia
- 1 Let L-410 Turbolet
- 1 Antonov An-24
- 1 Yakovlev Yak-42

== Certification ==
Trans Air Congo has been delivered the IOSA certificate until 2015.

== MilesPlus ==
MilesPlus is the frequent flyer program developed by TAC. Registration is free and open to every passengers. First company in Congo to develop a fidelity program, MilesPlus has proved to be a successful tool as the program enrolled more than 2200 members since its creation in 2012. MilesPlus offers 4 different cards (Blue, Silver, Gold and Platinum).

== Incidents and accidents ==
- On 21 March 2011, a transport Antonov An-12 on a flight from Brazzaville Maya-Maya Airport to Pointe-Noire Antonio Agostinho Neto International Airport, registered TN-AGK, carrying a crew of 4, crashed into the Mvou-Mvou residential area in Pointe-Noire, Republic of the Congo. According to sources with the Congo National Agency of Civil Aviation, the aircraft had been cleared to land, and was on a 3-mile final approach when it crashed. The Russian Embassy in Congo reported that the 3 Russian and 1 Kazakhstani crewmembers were killed in the crash. Local medical services report that 23 bodies were recovered from the crash site, along with 15 injured people.
