= Aéro-Service =

Airline based in Pointe-Noire, Republic of the Congo

IATA	ICAO	Call sign
BF	RSR	CONGOSERV
- Founded: 1967
- Ceased operations: 2019
- Hubs: Pointe Noire Airport
- Fleet size: 5
- Headquarters: Pointe-Noire, Republic of the Congo
- Website: aero-service.net

Société Aéro-Service Afrigo was an airline headquartered in Pointe-Noire, Republic of the Congo. It operated chartered cargo and business passenger flights within Congo and to neighbouring countries out of its base at Pointe-Noire Airport.

== History ==
The airline was established and started operations in 1967 as an air freight transport department of a frozen food company. It later became an independent airline and was wholly owned by the TAG Light Aviation Department. Since 16 November 2009, Aéro-Service is banned from entering the European Union, along with all other airlines registered in the Republic of the Congo.

== Fleet ==
As of May 2011, the Aéro-Service fleet consists of the following aircraft:

Aéro-Service fleet
Aircraft	In service
Britten-Norman Islander	2
CASA C-212 Aviocar	2
Yakovlev Yak-40	1
Total	5

== Accidents and incidents ==
- In June 1981, an Aéro-Service Britten-Norman Islander (registered TN-ADS) suffered a crash landing and was subsequently written off.
- On 11 March 1994, an Aéro-Service Swearingen Merlin (registered TN-ADP) was damaged beyond repair in a crash landing at Pointe Noire Airport, following a chartered flight from Port-Gentil with 4 passengers and 2 crew members on board. Upon landing approach, the landing gear failed to deploy, and the pilots did not manage to execute a go-around, but belly-landed on the runway.
- On 23 December 2005, an Aéro-Service Antonov An-24 (registered ER-AZX), which was leased from Pecotox Air, was substantially damaged when it ran off the runway upon landing.
- On 25 January 2008, an Aéro-Service Antonov An-12BP (registered EK-11660) suffered a brake failure whilst taxiing at Pointe Noire Airport, so that it ran into a parked Boeing 727-247 (9L-LEF). Both aircraft were damaged beyond economic repair.
- On 19 June 2010 at ca 10:00 local time, an Aéro-Service CASA C-212 Aviocar (registered TN-AFA) crashed near Djoum, Cameroon, killing all nine passengers and the two crew members on board.
- On 30 November 2012, an Aéro-Service Ilyushin Il-76T on a cargo flight from Pointe Noire to Brazzaville crashed during landing short of runway 5L at Maya-Maya Airport in Brazzaville in bad weather, in a residential area. All six crew members, five of them from Armenia, one police officer on board the aircraft, and 26 people on the ground were killed, and 14 people on the ground were injured.
