= Canadian Airways Congo =

Congolese airline

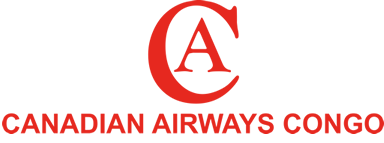
- Founded: 2004
- Hubs: Maya-Maya Airport
- Fleet size: 4
- Destinations: 4
- Headquarters: Brazzaville, Congo
- Website: www.canairco.net

Canadian Airways Congo (alternatively known as Canair Congo) is a Congolese passenger airline company. It was established in 2004. The airline's hub is Maya-Maya Airport, in Brazzaville.

The airline is on the list of airlines banned within the European Union, as are all Congolese airlines.

== Fleet ==
=== Current fleet ===
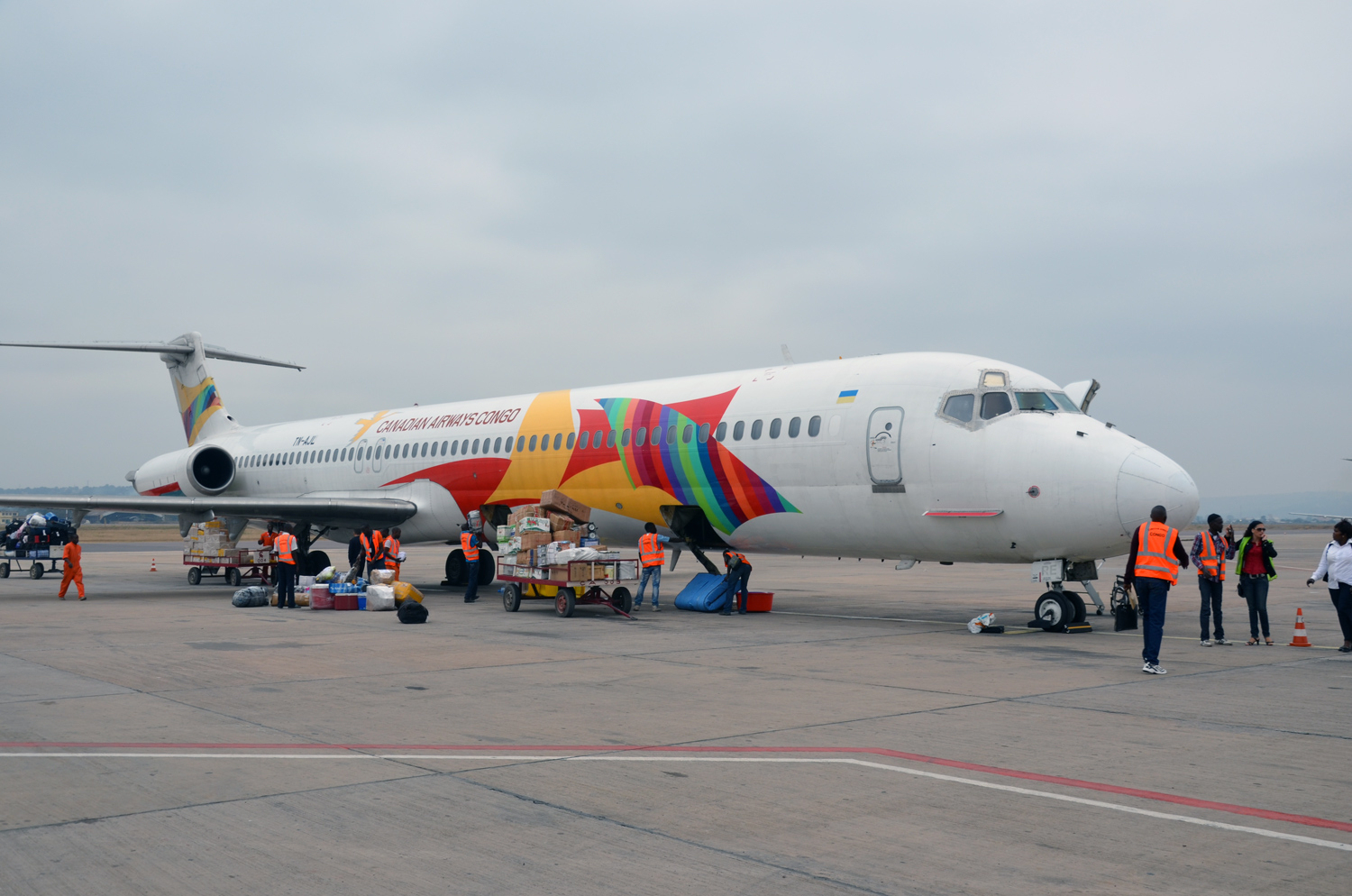
McDonnell Douglas MD-82

As of July 2026, Canadian Airways Congo operates the following aircraft:

Canadian Airways Congo Fleet
Aircraft	In Service	Orders	Passengers	Notes
McDonnell Douglas MD-82	3	—	156	
McDonnell Douglas MD-83	1	—	158	
Total	4			

=== Former fleet ===
As of August 2025, Canadian Airways Congo operated 1 Boeing 737-300, 3 McDonnell Douglas MD-82 and 1 McDonnell Douglas MD-83.

The airline also previously operated the following aircraft:

- 1 Boeing 737-500

== Accidents and incidents ==
- On Friday, January 25, 2008, a Boeing 727-247 that Canadian Airways Congo had leased from Teebah Airlines was damaged after an Antonov AN-12 ran into it as it was parked. The 727 was written off after the accident, which happened at Pointe Noire Airport, Pointe Noire, Congo. There were no occupants inside the Boeing 727, and no fatalities on the Antonov airplane. The Boeing 727 was wearing basic Iraqi Airways livery with Canadian Airways Congo titles when the accident took place.

== See also ==
List of airlines of the Republic of the Congo
