= Maya-Maya Airport =

Airport in Brazzaville, Republic of Congo

Maya–Maya International Airport Brazzaville International Airport
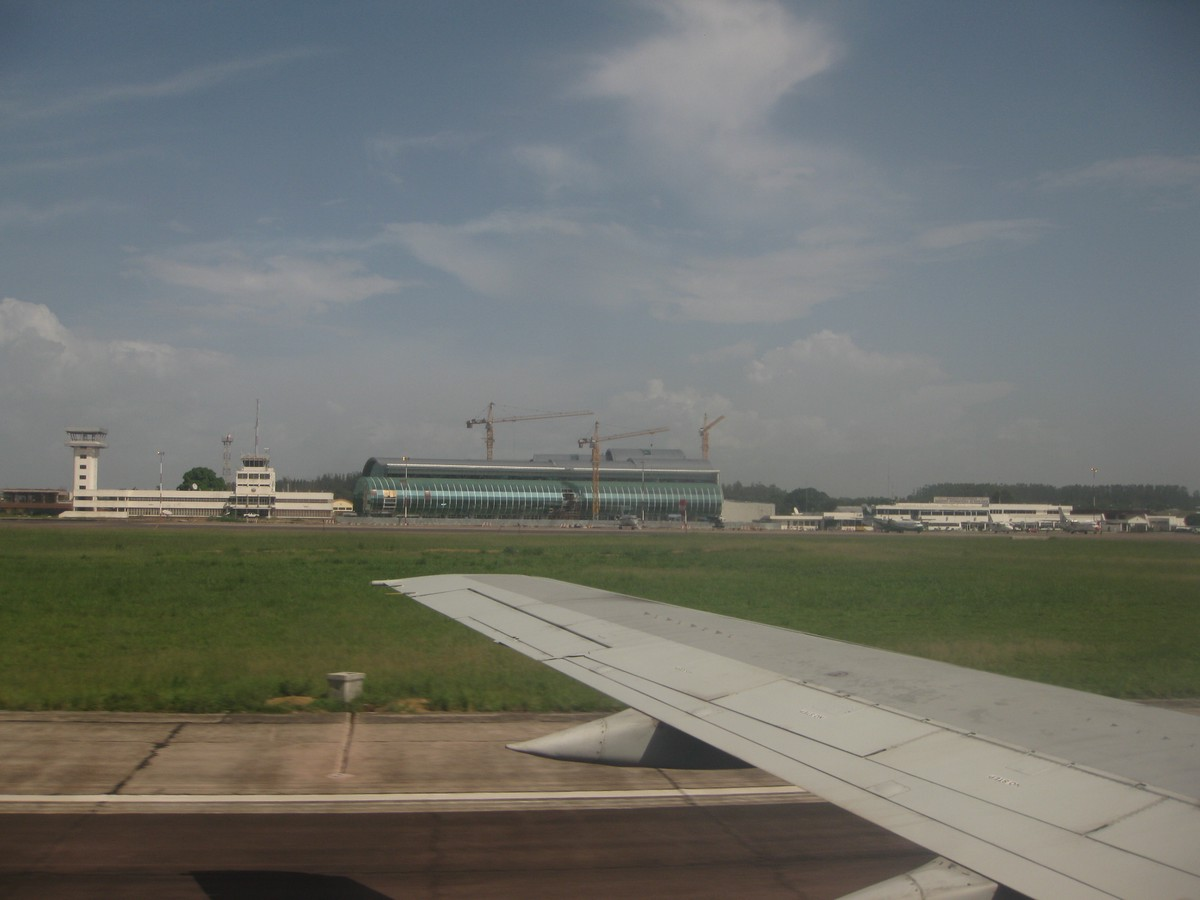
- Image of Maya–Maya International Airport
- IATA: BZV; ICAO: FCBB

Summary
- Airport type: Public / Military
- Serves: Brazzaville
- Location: Brazzaville, Republic of Congo
- Elevation AMSL: 1,048 ft (319 m)
- Coordinates: 04°15′06″S 15°15′11″E
- Website: www.brazzaville-airport.com

Map
- Location of airport in the Republic of Congo

Runways
Direction	Length		Surface
Direction	m	ft	Surface
05/23	3,300	10,827	Asphalt

Maya–Maya International Airport (IATA: BZV, ICAO: FCBB) (French: Aéroport international Maya-Maya) is an international airport serving Brazzaville, the capital of the Republic of Congo.

== Facilities ==
In 2010, a new 3,300-metre (10,800 ft) long runway and a new terminal with three air bridges were opened. The older runway was repaired and now is used as a taxiway. A second phase of the new terminal was completed in 2013, the construction of which, valued at $160 million, was undertaken by Chinese construction firm Weihai International Economic & Technical Cooperative Co., Ltd.

The head office of the republic's air accident investigation agency, Aircraft Accident Investigation Bureau (BEA Congo), is on the property of the airport.

== Airlines and destinations ==
=== Passenger ===
Airlines	Destinations
Afrijet	Libreville
Air Côte d'Ivoire	Abidjan, Accra, Libreville, Kinshasa–N'djili
Air France	Paris–Charles de Gaulle
ASKY Airlines	Kinshasa–N'djili, Lomé
Camair-Co	Douala
Canadian Airways Congo	Impfondo, Ouesso, Pointe-Noire
Ethiopian Airlines	Addis Ababa
Kenya Airways	Luanda, Nairobi–Jomo Kenyatta
Mauritania Airlines	Bamako, Cotonou, Nouakchott
Royal Air Maroc	Casablanca
RwandAir	Cotonou, Kigali
TAAG Angola Airlines	Luanda–Agostinho Neto
Trans Air Congo	Douala, Libreville, Pointe-Noire

=== Cargo ===
Airlines	Destinations
Air France Cargo	Bangui
Cargolux	Luxembourg
Etihad Cargo	Abu Dhabi, Lagos
Ethiopian Airlines Cargo	Addis Ababa

== Accidents and incidents ==
- On 19 September 1989, UTA Flight 772, a McDonnell Douglas DC-10-30 (registration N54629) operating the Brazzaville-N'Djamena-Paris CDG sector, was bombed 46 minutes after take-off from N'Djamena causing the aircraft to crash while flying over Niger, killing all 156 passengers and 14 crew members on board. This incident marked the deadliest air disaster involving a French-operated airliner, in terms of loss of life for nearly 20 years until Air France Flight 447 in June 2009.
- 23 November 1996: Hijackers forced Ethiopian Airlines Flight 961, bound from Mumbai and Addis Ababa to Abidjan through many stops (including Brazzaville), to crash into the Indian Ocean.
- On 26 August 2009, an Antonov An-12 of Aero-Fret (registered TN-AIA) crashed on approach. The flight had originated from Pointe Noire Airport. The five Ukrainian crew and one Congolese passenger were killed.
- On 30 November 2012, an Aéro-Service (initially mistakenly attributed to Trans Air Congo) Ilyushin Il-76T on a cargo flight from Pointe-Noire to Brazzaville crashed during landing short of runway 5L at Maya–Maya Airport in Brazzaville in bad weather, in a residential area. All six crew members, five of them from Armenia, one police officer on board the aircraft, and 26 people on the ground were killed, and 14 people on the ground were injured.
