= Port-Gentil International Airport =

Port-Gentil International Airport Aéroport international de Port-Gentil
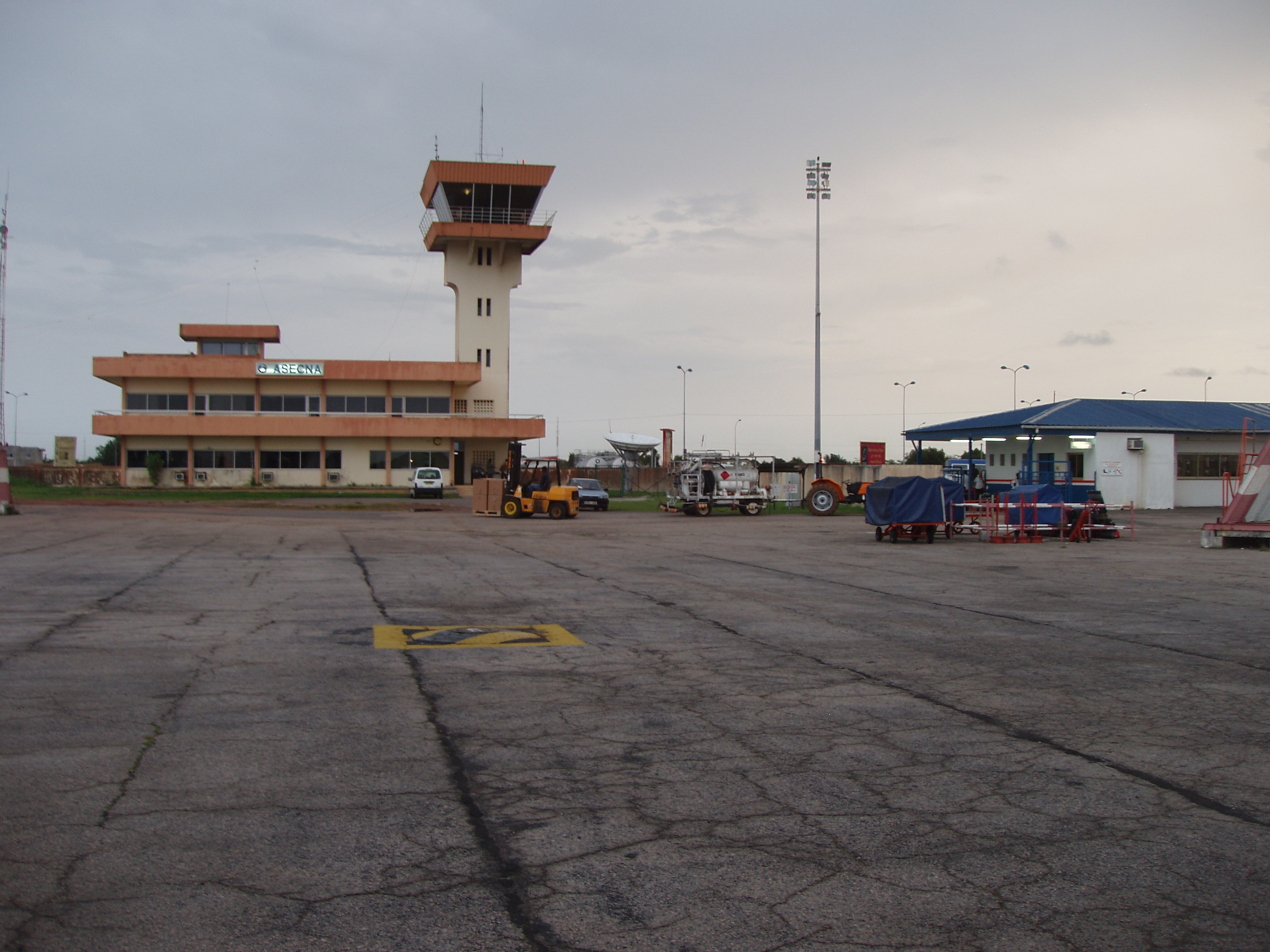
- IATA: POG; ICAO: FOOG

Summary
- Airport type: Public
- Serves: Port-Gentil, Gabon
- Elevation AMSL: 13 ft / 4 m
- Coordinates: 0°42′45″S 8°45′15″E
- Website: portgentilinternational.com

Map
- Location of Airport in Gabon

Runways
Direction	Length		Surface
Direction	m	ft	Surface
03/21	2,591	8,501	Asphalt
- Sources: SkyVector Google Maps GCM

Port-Gentil International Airport (French: Aéroport international de Port-Gentil) (IATA: POG, ICAO: FOOG) is an airport serving the city of Port-Gentil, in Ogooué-Maritime Province, Gabon.

The Port-Gentil VOR (Ident: PG) and Port-Gentil non-directional beacon (Ident: PG) are located on the field.

== Airlines and destinations ==
=== Passenger ===
Airlines	Destinations
Afrijet	Libreville
Equaflight	Pointe-Noire
Nationale Regionale Transport	Libreville, Oyem
Tropical Air Gabon	Charter: Libreville, Onal

== Accidents and incidents ==
- On October 12, 2011, a Nationale Regionale Transport EMB-120, registration ZS-PYO (MSN: 120245), performing a charter flight from Libreville to Port-Gentil (Gabon), overran the end of runway 21, and came to a stop with the nose gear intact but with both main gear struts bent backwards, causing the engines to "pitch down" together with the wings. A few passengers sustained minor injuries, but the aircraft was damaged beyond repair and was written off.

== See also ==
- List of airports in Gabon
- Transport in Gabon
