= Agostinho-Neto International Airport =

Airport in Pointe-Noire, Republic of the Congo

- IATA: PNR; ICAO: FCPP

Summary
- Serves: Pointe-Noire, Republic of the Congo
- Hub for: Equaflight, Trans Air Congo
- Elevation AMSL: 55 ft / 17 m
- Coordinates: 04°48′48″S 11°53′09″E

Map
- Location of Airport in Republic of the Congo

Runways
Direction	Length		Surface
Direction	m	ft	Surface
17/35	2,600	8,530	Asphalt
- Sources: GCM

Antonio-Agostinho-Neto International Airport (IATA: PNR, ICAO: FCPP) is an airport serving Pointe-Noire, a coastal city in the Republic of the Congo. The runway is surrounded by the densely populated city, and is 3 kilometres (1.9 mi) inland from the Atlantic shore.

== History ==
The airport was inaugurated in 1934; a new passenger terminal opened in 2006.

== Airlines and destinations ==
=== Passenger ===
Airlines	Destinations
Afrijet	Libreville
Air Côte d'Ivoire	Abidjan, Libreville, Kinshasa–N'djili
Air France	Luanda, Paris–Charles de Gaulle
ASKY Airlines	Lomé, Luanda
Camair-Co	Douala, Libreville
Canadian Airways Congo	Brazzaville
Equaflight	Port-Gentil
Ethiopian Airlines	Addis Ababa
Mauritania Airlines	Bamako, Cotonou, Nouakchott
TAAG Angola Airlines	Luanda
Trans Air Congo	Brazzaville, Cotonou, Douala, Libreville
Turkish Airlines	Istanbul, Libreville (all flights suspended)

=== Cargo ===
Airlines	Destinations
Air France Cargo	Paris–Charles de Gaulle
Ethiopian Airlines Cargo	Addis Ababa, Liège, Luxembourg

== Accidents and incidents ==
- On 4 June 1969, a Douglas DC-3 of the Direcção de Exploração dos Transportes Aéreos was hijacked on a domestic flight from N'zeto Airport to Soyo Airport, Angola. The aircraft landed at Pointe Noire.
- On 11 March 1994, Aéro-Service Swearingen Merlin TN-ADP was written off in a landing accident when the crew neglected to lower the undercarriage.
- On 10 May 2007, Tenir Air Ilyushin Il-76TD EX-093 was destroyed in a fire whilst being loaded for a cargo fire.
- On 15 September 2007, Veteran Airlines Antonov An-12B UR-CEN was damaged beyond economic repair in a fire which occurred when the engines were being started.
- On 25 January 2008, Canadian Airways Congo Boeing 727–247 9L-LEF was damaged beyond economic repair when it was struck on the ground by Aéro-Service Antonov An-12BP EK-11660 which suffered a brake failure while taxiing. The An-12 was also damaged beyond economic repair, but there were no injuries reported.
- On 10 November 2008, Veteran Airlines Antonov An-12 UR-PLV suffered an in-flight fire. A safe landing was made at Pointe-Noire but the aircraft was subsequently destroyed by fire.
- On 21 March 2011, Trans Air Congo Antonov An-12 TN-AGK crashed on approach to Pointe Noire airport. All four crew were killed, as well as a number of people on the ground.
- On 11 April 2020, an unoccupied Air France Airbus A330 F-GZCK was damaged by two gunshots while on the ground at Pointe Noire airport. The aircraft had been assisting in repatriation efforts during the 2019–20 coronavirus pandemic.

== See also ==
- List of airports in the Republic of the Congo
- Transport in the Republic of the Congo
