= M'Vengue El Hadj Omar Bongo Ondimba International Airport =

M'Vengue El Hadj Omar Bongo Ondimba International Airport Aéroport International M'Vengue El Hadj Omar Bongo Ondimba
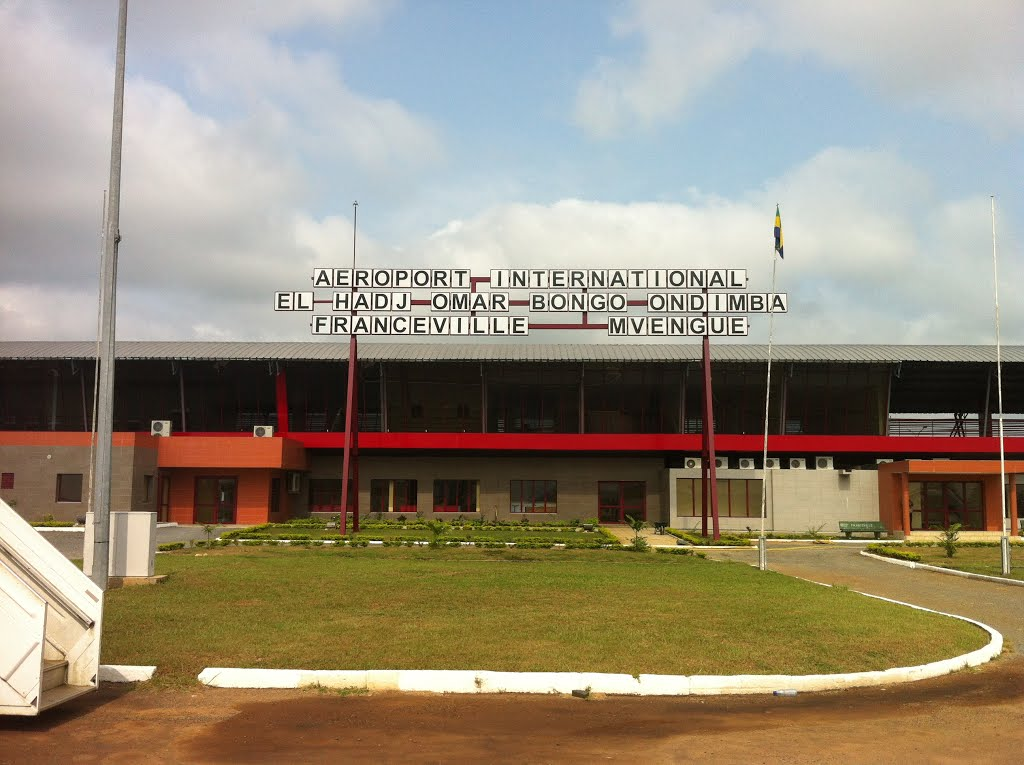
- IATA: MVB; ICAO: FOON

Summary
- Airport type: Civil/Military
- Serves: Franceville
- Location: M'Vengue, Gabon
- Elevation AMSL: 1,450 ft / 442 m
- Coordinates: 01°39′22″S 13°26′17″E

Map
- Location within Gabon

Runways
Direction	Length		Surface
Direction	m	ft	Surface
15/33	3,200	10,499	Asphalt
- Sources: GCM

M'Vengue El Hadj Omar Bongo Ondimba International Airport (French: Aéroport International M'Vengue El Hadj Omar Bongo Ondimba) (IATA: MVB, ICAO: FOON) is an airport serving the city of Franceville, Haut-Ogooué Province, Gabon. The airport is 16 kilometres (9.9 mi) west of the city, near the village of M'Vengue.

== Airlines and destinations ==
Airlines	Destinations
Afrijet	Libreville
Nationale Regionale Transport	Libreville

== See also ==
- List of airports in Gabon
- Transport in Gabon
