= Girma Wake =

Chief executive officer of Uganda Airlines (born 1943)

- Born: June 23, 1943 (age 83); Yeka district, Addis Ababa
- Occupations: Management consultant and Interim Acting CEO of Uganda Airlines

Girma Wake (born 23 June 1943) is an Ethiopian business executive who has served as acting chief executive officer of Uganda Airlines since 16 February 2026.

Before that, he served as the chairman of the Ethiopian Airlines Group from 2022 until 2023. He was previously the CEO of Ethiopian Airlines from 2004 to 2011, and served as the chairman of the board of directors of Rwandair from 2012 until 2017. Girma returned to Ethiopian Airlines in 2018 by joining its board of directors and was elevated to chairman in 2022.

In June 2023, Girma was replaced as chairman by Yilma Merdassa, who is the head of the Ethiopian Air Force The company stated in a press release that Girma's "contribution to the growth and success of the airline group has been enormous and will take a special place in the history of the group"

== Early life and education ==
Girma was born in 1943 in Yeka district, Addis Ababa. He attended the Dejazmatch Wondiyirad School and then the Kotebe Teacher's College. He attended the University College of Addis Ababa, then the country's only higher education institution. He was recruited in his second year by the airline.

== Career ==
Girma joined Ethiopian Airlines upon his graduation in 1965. At the time, the airline was dominated by Americans, primarily from TWA, which had assisted in the airline's development. Girma was one of the first Ethiopians to rise in the airline's executive hierarchy. Girma stayed at the airline for nearly three decades, until debates in 1993 between the new Ethiopian People's Revolutionary Democratic Front government and the airline leadership led to several resignations, including that of Girma.

In November 2003, Seyoum Mesfin, chairman of Ethiopian Airlines, and then-minister of foreign affairs, offered Girma, then at Gulf Air as head of cargo operations, the position of Ethiopian Airlines' CEO. Girma, then 60, was at first reluctant to take the position but he eventually relented with the intention for only staying in the post for five years and also serving the carrier without government interference under his leadership.

When Girma became CEO in February 2004, Ethiopian Airlines had only twelve jetliners. It carried 1.2 million passengers annually to 42 international and 16 domestic destinations. Girma spent most of 2004 devising a plan with the assistance from the local branch of Ernst and Young. The plan that was formulated was Vision 2010 that was launched in 2005, however the plan was received with skepticism. Despite this, between 2005 and 2010 the airline grew at an average rate of 25% per annum. The 1.2 million passengers the airline used to carry annually when Girma took office almost tripled and now stood at 3.2 million by the end of the plan. The 12 planes the airline had increased by more than three-fold to 37, and the airline's fleet was one of the youngest globally. The airline went from having one codeshare agreement to becoming as a member of Star Alliance, which it joined in 2011.

Under Girma, Ethiopian Airlines Girma’s created 1,500 new jobs including 250 for foreigners. The profits the airline has made have significantly raised employees’ incomes by an average of 167 percent. Ethiopian also increased its presence in other African markets, forming a strategic partnership with the West African ASKY Airlines, in which it has a 45% stake.

After he stepped down in 2011 and was replaced by Tewolde Gebremariam, he became chairman of the United Insurance Company. In 2012, he became chairman of Rwandair, the flag carrier of Rwanda, a position he held until 2017. In December 2018, he joined the board of directors of Ethiopian Airlines Group.

In February 2026, Yoweri Museveni, the president of Uganda appointed Girma as a special consultant and acting chief executive officer of Uganda Airlines, the national carrier of Uganda. Girma was tasked to oversee the appointment of a substantive CEO for the airline following the termination of the services of Jenifer Bamuturaki. He was tasked to constitute a qualified, competent management team, while overseeing the day-to-day operations. He is expected to work with the airline's board, where necessary.

== See also ==
- Mesfin Tasew Bekele
- Tewolde Gebremariam
- Mohammed Ahmed
- Jenifer Bamuturaki
