= Tewolde Gebremariam =

Ethiopian corporate executive

Tewolde GebreMariam
- ተወልደ ገብረማርያም
- Born: Ethiopia
- Education: Addis Ababa University (Bachelor of Arts in Economics); Open University (Master of Business Administration)
- Occupation: Corporate executive
- Years active: 1985–present
- Known for: Professional competence
- Title: Senior Strategic Advisor at Delta Air Lines, Former CEO at Ethiopian Airlines Group CEO of Air India

Tewolde GebreMariam Tesfay (Amharic: ተወልደ ገብረማርያም ተስፋይ) is an Ethiopian business executive who has been appointed as the chief executive officer of Air India. He previously served as the group chief executive officer of the Ethiopian Airlines Group from 2011 to 2022.He has taken charge officially as the CEO of Air India after getting security clearance from Govt of India.

== Background and education ==
Tewolde GebreMariam is an Ethiopian national. He holds a Bachelor of Arts degree in Economics, obtained from Addis Ababa University. His second degree was a Master of Business Administration degree, obtained from the Open University, in the United Kingdom. He has also received an honorary doctorate from Addis Ababa University in 2019.

He served as Executive Officer of Marketing & Sales to head the Marketing and Sales Operations of Ethiopian Airlines in 2004. On July 1, 2006, he was appointed as chief operating officer of Ethiopian Airlines to head all the operating divisions of the airline Commercial, Flight Operations, Customer Services and Maintenance and Engineering. In addition to his duties as CEO of Ethiopian Airlines, he served as a member on the High-level Advisory Group on Sustainable Transport (HLAG-ST) with United Nations Secretary-General Ban Ki-moon. He also served as a member of the board of governors of the International Air Transport Association (IATA); an Executive Committee member of the African Airlines Association (AFRAA); a board member of the Airlink Advisory Council; a member of board of directors of Africa Travel Association (ATA); a member of board of directors of Ethio-Telecom, a board member of Ethiopian Railway Corporation; a board member of Commercial Bank of Ethiopia; and the chairman of the board of directors of the Ethiopian Tourism Organization (ETO).

Currently he owns and operates a consultancy company TGM Advisory Services LLC and he is working as a Senior Strategic Advisor at Delta Air Lines.

== Career ==
Tewolde joined Ethiopian Airlines in 1985 as a traffic officer based in Addis Ababa. He rose through the ranks to become manager cargo traffic handling. He then served as area manager and regional director for India based in Bombay, Saudi Arabia based in Jeddah, and then North America based in New York City. In 2004, he was appointed to head the Sales and Marketing Department of the airline, and in 2006 as the chief operations officer.

Following the retirement of Girma Wake in 2011, Tewolde was elevated to the role of group chief executive officer and retired on 23 March 2022, citing health reasons. Under his leadership, Ethiopian Airlines grew to become the largest airline in Africa, and a member of Star Alliance.

Tewolde was especially hailed for his leadership following the crash of Ethiopian Airlines flight 302 and during the COVID-19 pandemic. Tewolde led the Airline for over a decade with exceptional performance in many parameters, including exponential growth from US$1 billion annual turn-over to $4.5 billion, from 33 airplanes to 130 airplanes and from 3 million passengers to 12 million passengers (pre-COVID). Under his leadership, the airline group has grown by four fold in all measurements building more than $700 million worth of vital infrastructure like Africa’s biggest hotel, Cargo terminal, MRO hangars and shops, Aviation Academy and Full Flight Simulators. He was awarded the "Ordem de Rio Branco" by the Government of Brazil in recognition of his services repatriating Brazilian nationals and transporting COVID-19 vaccines.

Tewolde retired from Ethiopian Airlines in March 2022, citing personal health reasons. He was succeeded by Mesfin Tasew Bekele.

In August 2026, Tewolde became the new Chief Executive Officer and Managing Director of Air India succeeding Campbell Wilson. The airline's board appointed him after an exhaustive search for executives. At the time of his appointment, Air India was undergoing a major transformation under the Tata Group and was facing significant operational and financial challenges, including huge losses and the aftermath of the June 2025 Air India Flight AI171 crash. “Gebremariam will take Air India through the next phase of execution and expansion, leveraging his experience of leading Ethiopian Airlines,” Air India said.[1]

== Titles, awards and honors ==
Tewolde has been a multiple award winner for his role as CEO of Ethiopian Airlines Group from 2011 to 2022.

- 2012 African CEO of the Year from the African CEO forum.
- 2012 Best African Business Leader.
- 2013 Airline Strategy Award for Regional Leadership in the award’s from Airline Business Magazine
- 2013 Planet Africa Professional Excellence Award 2013.
- 2015 Most Gender Focused CEO Award from the Leading Women of Africa (LWA).
- 2015 International GrandPrix Special Award in Milan.
- 2019 inductee to The African CEO's Hall Of Fame.
- He was among 100 most influential Africans for two consecutive years in 2019 and 2020.
- 2021 Air Cargo Leadership Award on the Airline Strategy Awards from FlightGlobal Magazine.
- 2022 Airline Strategy Awards from FlightGlobal.

== See also ==
- Girma Wake
- Mesfin Tasew Bekele
- Mohammed Ahmed
