= Mesfin Tasew Bekele =

Ethiopian electrical engineer and corporate executive

- Born: Ethiopia
- Citizenship: Ethiopia
- Education: Addis Ababa University (Bachelor of Science in Electrical Engineering) (Master of Science in Communications Engineering); Open University (Master of Business Administration)
- Occupation: Corporate Executive
- Years active: 1984 – present
- Known for: Professional competence
- Title: Chief Executive Officer at Ethiopian Airlines Group

Mesfin Tasew Bekele is an Ethiopian businessman, electrical and communications engineer, who serves as the group chief executive officer of the Ethiopian Airlines Group, since 24 March 2022.

Before that, between 2021 and March 2022, Mesfin T. Bekele was the CEO of Asky Airlines, a private Togolese airline, in which the Ethiopian Airlines Group is a strategic partner, maintains a 40 percent ownership and is the largest shareholder.

== Background and education ==
Mesfin is an Ethiopian national. He holds a Bachelor of Science degree in Electrical Engineering, obtained from Addis Ababa University. His second degree, a Master of Science in Communications Engineering was also awarded by Addis Ababa University. He also holds a Master of Business Administration degree, obtained from the Open University, in the United Kingdom.

== Career ==
For the 11 years between 2010 and 2021, Mesfin was the chief operations officer (COO) of the Ethiopian Airlines Group, based at the group headquarters in Addis Ababa, Ethiopia's capital city. Having joined the airline in 1984, he has served in various roles, including in airline engineering, maintenance and management. Other areas include "aircraft procurement, flight operations and strategic development".

As CEO of Ethiopian Airlines Group, he will lead over 17,000 employees, replacing Tewolde Gebremariam, the previous CEO, who retired on 23 March 2022, for health reasons.

== See also ==
- Girma Wake
- Tewolde Gebremariam
- Mohammed Ahmed
