= Gervais Djondo =

Togolese entrepreneur

Koffi Gbondjidè Gervais Djondo (born c. 1934) is a Togolese entrepreneur. He is the co-founder and former chairman of Ecobank. He is also the founder and current president of ASKY Airlines.

== Awards ==
- Africa Awards for Entrepreneurship’s Lifetime Achievement Award (2014)
