= Ethiopian Airlines =

State-owned airline of Ethiopia

Ethiopian Airlines የኢትዮጵያ አየር መንገድ

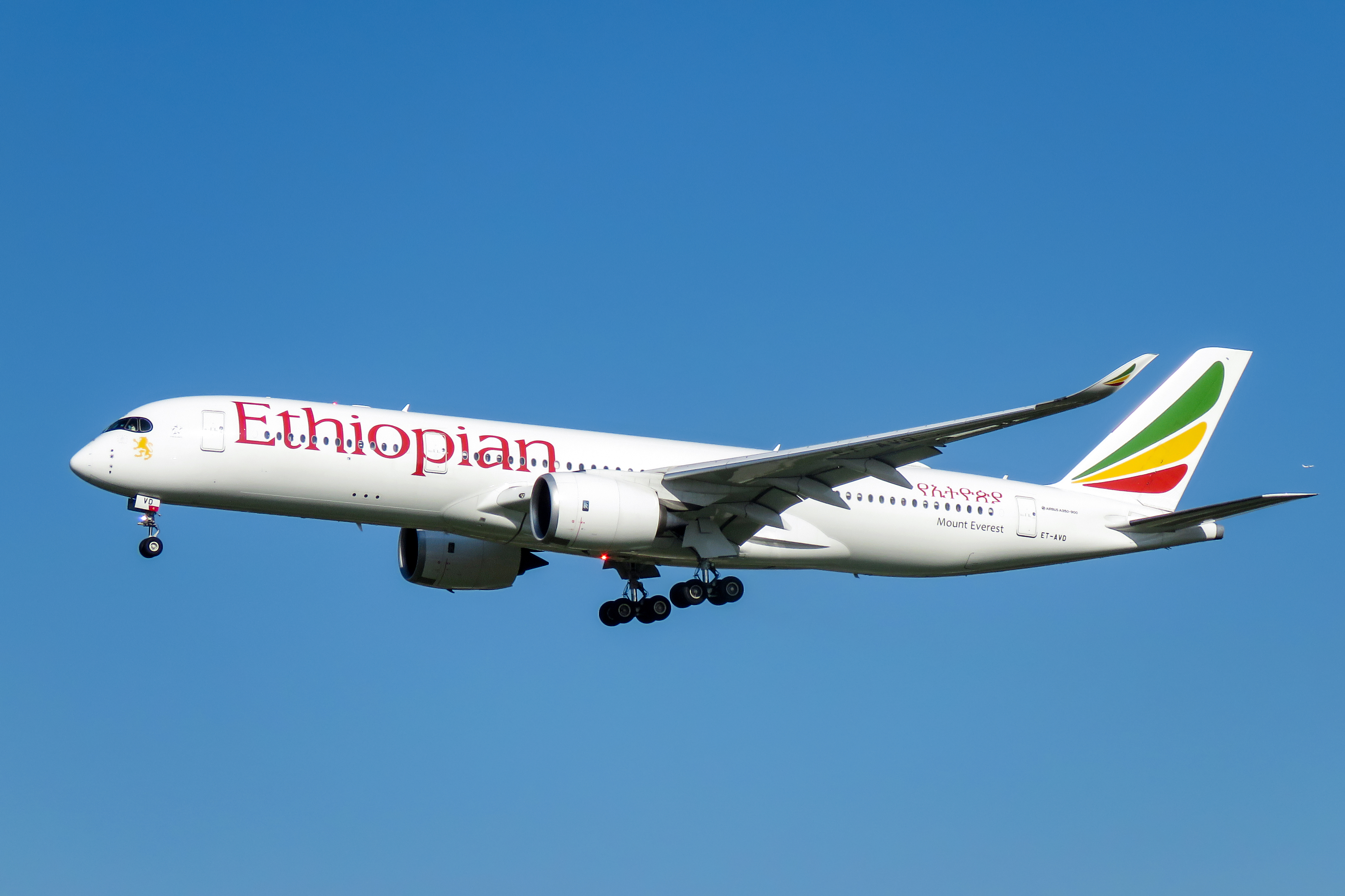
- Ethiopian Airlines Airbus A350-900
IATA	ICAO	Call sign
ET	ETH	ETHIOPIAN
- Founded: 21 December 1945; 80 years ago
- Commenced operations: 8 April 1946; 80 years ago
- Hubs: Addis Ababa
- Secondary hubs: Liège (Ethiopian Airlines Cargo); Lilongwe; Lomé; Lusaka
- Frequent-flyer program: ShebaMiles
- Alliance: Star Alliance
- Subsidiaries: Air Congo 49%; Asky Airlines 27%; Guinea Airways 49%; Malawi Airlines 49%; Zambia Airways 45%; DHL-Ethiopian Airlines Logistics Services S.C. 51%; Ethiopian Sky Technologies 51%; Ethiopian Skylight Hotel 100%
- Fleet size: 147
- Destinations: 161 passenger; 68 cargo
- Parent company: Ethiopian Investment Holdings (100%)
- Headquarters: Bole International Airport, Addis Ababa, Ethiopia
- Key people: Yilma Merdassa (Chairman); Mesfin Tasew (CEO); Adamu Tadele Belay (CFO); Lemma Yadecha (CCO); Retta Melaku (COO)
- Founder: Emperor Haile Selassie I
- Revenue: ▲ETB 396.7 billion (FY 2024)
- Operating income: ▲ETB 61.6 billion (FY 2024)
- Net income: ▼ETB 49.0 billion (FY 2024)
- Total assets: ▲ETB 743.9 billion (FY 2024)
- Total equity: ▲ETB 347.8 billion (FY 2024)
- Employees: 18,000 (November 2023)
- Website: ethiopianairlines.com

Ethiopian Airlines (Amharic: የኢትዮጵያ አየር መንገድ, romanised: Ye-Ītyōṗṗyā āyer menged), formerly Ethiopian Air Lines (EAL), is the flag carrier of Ethiopia, and is wholly owned by the country's government. EAL was founded on 21 December 1945 and commenced operations on 8 April 1946, expanding to international flights in 1951. The firm became a share company in 1965 and changed its name from Ethiopian Air Lines to Ethiopian Airlines.

The airline has been a member of the International Air Transport Association since 1959 and of the African Airlines Association (AFRAA) since 1968. Ethiopian is a Star Alliance member, having joined in December 2011. The company slogan is 'The New Spirit of Africa.' Ethiopian's hub and headquarters are at Bole International Airport in Addis Ababa, from where it serves a network of 155 passenger destinations—22 of them domestic—and 68 freighter destinations. The airline has secondary hubs in Togo and Malawi. Ethiopian Airlines is Africa's largest airline in terms of passengers carried, destinations served, fleet size, and revenue. Ethiopian Airlines is also the world's fourth-largest airline by the number of countries served. Ethiopian Airlines is a subsidiary of the Ethiopian Airlines Group, which is wholly owned by Ethiopian Investment Holdings, the sovereign wealth fund of Ethiopia.

== History ==
=== The 1940s: early years ===
After the liberation of Ethiopia, Emperor Haile Selassie I asked the United States, the United Kingdom, and France to help him establish an airline as part of his modernisation effort. According to the BBC News there is a possibility that the Emperor intended the creation of a quality national airline to help dispel impressions of Ethiopian poverty. In 1945, the Ethiopian government began negotiations with both Transcontinental Air Transport and Western Air Express (later merged into TWA). On 8 September 1945, TWA signed an agreement with the American historian and foreign affairs advisor to Ethiopia John H. Spencer to establish a commercial aviation company in Ethiopia.

The carrier, originally called Ethiopian Air Lines (EAL), was founded on 21 December 1945, with an initial investment of ETB 2,5 million, divided in 25,000 shares that the government entirely held. The company was financed by the Ethiopian government but managed by TWA. At the beginning, it relied upon American pilots, technicians, administrators and accountants; even its General Managers were from TWA. Minister of Works and Communications Fitawrari Tafasse Habte Mikael became EAL's first president and chairman, whereas H. H. Holloway —who was American— was appointed by TWA as general manager. The board held the first meeting on 26 December 1945, with a key point of the agenda being the deposit of E£75,000 in a bank in Cairo for the acquisition of aircraft and spare parts. Shortly afterwards, the airline negotiated for landing rights with Aden, Egypt, French Somaliland, Saudi Arabia and Sudan, and five Douglas C-47s were bought; these aircraft were flown to Addis Ababa in February 1946.

The new airline's maiden flight to Nairobi carried a shipment of East African currency equivalent to US$3.7 million in February 1946, but the first revenue scheduled service was on 8 April 1946; it travelled the Addis Ababa–Asmara–Cairo route using one of five Douglas C-47 Skytrains acquired from the US Government. This route later operated on a weekly basis. The Skytrains were initially intended for military use, although Ethiopian operated them in a mixed passenger-cargo configuration. Soon afterwards, the carrier launched services to Aden and Djibouti, as well as a domestic flight to Jimma. The main five routes in the early years were Addis Ababa–Asmara, Addis Ababa–Djibouti–Aden, Addis Ababa–Khartoum, Addis Ababa–Cairo (routed via Jeddah or Khartoum) and Asmara–Khartoum.

Henry Bruce Obermiller replaced Holloway as a general manager in June 1946. In July of the same year, four more Skytrains joined the fleet. New scheduled services to Sheikh Othman and Nairobi were launched in July 1946 and June 1947, respectively. In 1947, Waldon Gene Golien became the general manager, and the company started operating charter flights to Jeddah during the Hajj season. That year in February, three more Douglas C-47s were acquired to operate new international routes. A service to Mukalla was inaugurated in June 1947. In September, Port Sudan was added to the route network (it was previously a technical stop en route to Cairo), Lydda was incorporated as a scheduled destination in October and charter flights to Bombay were launched in November. Services to Lydda and Mukalla were discontinued in February and April 1948, respectively. In September, the route to Bombay became scheduled, with EAL flying as far as Aden, and BOAC operating the Aden–Bombay sector. The route also included stops at Mesirah Island in Oman and Karachi. For a brief period until April 1948, Mesirah Island was used as a refuelling stop; since then, services to French Somaliland and Aden started on a twice-weekly basis. EAL was allowed to fly to Aden using Sheik 'Othman Airport, located 16 kilometres (10 mi) away from the city, whereas BOAC used the Khormaksar Airport facilities, just 5 km (3 mi) from the city. Aden was under British rule at the time as was Sudan, and the British Empire denied EAL landing rights at Khartoum, forcing the airline to move the refuelling stop on the Aden route to Port Sudan. The carrier recorded a £40,000 profit for 1949.

=== The 1950s: start of long-haul routes ===
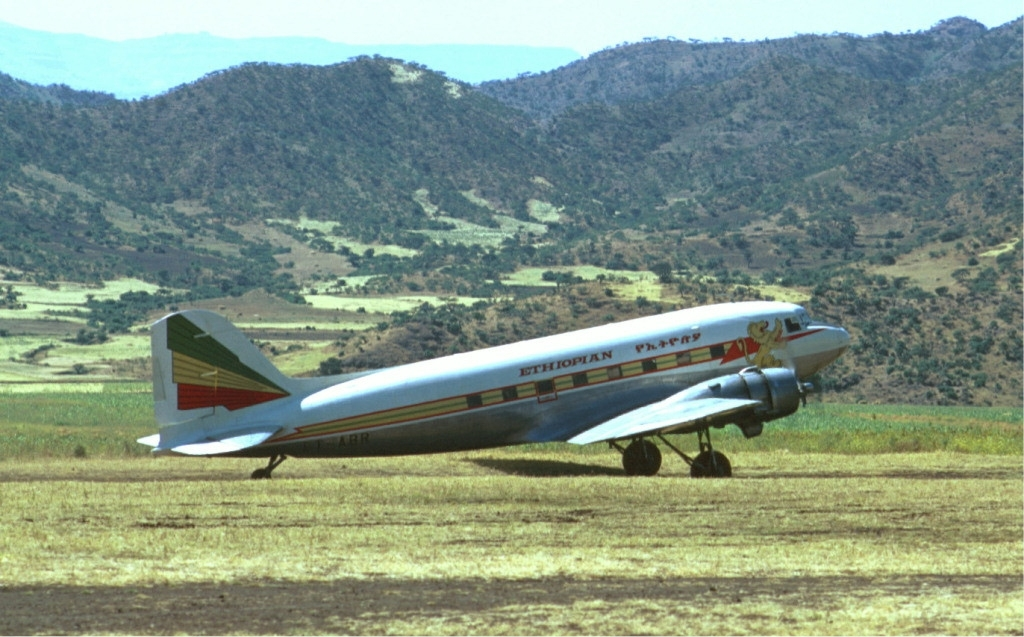
An Ethiopian Airlines Douglas DC-3 at Lalibela Airport in 1974.

Services to Bombay were withdrawn in July 1950. Also this year, a US$1,000,000 (equivalent to $13,381,743 in 2025) loan granted from the Ex-Im Bank enabled the carrier to incorporate Convair CV-240s, aimed at operating international routes. Two CV-240s, named "Eagle of Ethiopia" and "Haile Selassie I", entered the fleet in December 1950; starting January 1951, these aircraft were subsequently deployed on the Addis Ababa–Cairo, Addis Ababa–Nairobi, and Addis Ababa–Jeddah–Dhahran–Karachi routes, with Dhahran and Sharjah being incorporated to the route network on 20 February. In April 1952, the airline was appointed general sales agent for TWA in Kenya, Tanganyika, Uganda and Zanzibar, and by May the same year the fleet consisted of two Convair-Liner 240s and nine Douglas DC-3s or their subtypes, operating a route network that was 11,000 km (7,000 mi) long. Services to India and Sharjah were discontinued in 1953. On 14 July, a new agreement with TWA that succeeded the original one was signed. Unlike other companies, the airline's preamble stated that it was "the ultimate aim that EAL shall eventually be operated entirely by Ethiopian personnel".

A new service to Athens via Khartoum and Wadi Halfa was launched on 3 April 1954. A third Convair CV-240 ("The Spiritual Power") was purchased from Sabena in 1955 for US$560,000 (equivalent to $6,730,435 in 2025). These aircraft were equipped with rocket-assisted take-off devices. This was a common practice for a small number of airlines in the World that EAL had abandoned by April 1956. Also in 1955, Ethiopian inaugurated a self-owned maintenance facility. That year, Vic Harrell succeeded Swede Golien as general manager of the company. The carrier required newer and larger aircraft, and three different aircraft types —two from the Lockheed Corporation, the Constellation and the Electra, and the Douglas DC-6— were considered for the fleet renewal programme. Two Douglas DC-6Bs were eventually ordered in 1956 for US$4 million, including spares; an option for a third machine was also taken. Another loan obtained from the Ex-Im Bank, a £85 million one dating back to 1955, was partly used to finance the two purchased aircraft.

Benghazi was briefly served between 7 November 1956 and 15 January 1957. In 1957, a third DC-6B was purchased. Likewise, that year the airline had been asked to take a Lockheed L-749 that had been given as a gift to the Emperor, who declined it. Ethiopian paid US$1.6 million for this airframe, and it was incorporated into the fleet on 4 June; the aircraft was destroyed by fire on 10 July in an accident in Sudan. Two Yemeni cities, Hodeida and Taiz were first served on 1 September 1957. On 23 May 1958, flights to Wadi Halfa were terminated. The incorporation of three Douglas DC-6Bs took place between May and July, and EAL started a new link between Addis Ababa and Athens, via Cairo, using these recently delivered aircraft. On 21 Jun, the route was extended both to the north and to the south so that Frankfurt and Nairobi became linked by the same corridor, operated with DC-6Bs. By this time, the Convairs were redeployed to serve domestic and regional routes. Given that radio operators were no longer required as part of flight crews, they were assigned other tasks with the airline. Swissair handled the pilot training for the DC-6B aircraft at Zürich. The suspension of fifth freedom rights between Djibouti and Aden prompted the discontinuance of the route that linked them. EAL joined the International Air Transport Association (IATA) on 1 January 1959. During the year, two Boeing 720Bs were ordered and scheduled for delivery in December 1961, two more DC-6Bs entered the fleet, services to Nairobi were suspended once more and the airline's list of domestic destinations saw the incorporation of Bulchi, Dodollo, Lalibela and Masawa.

=== The 1960s and 1970s: the jet age ===
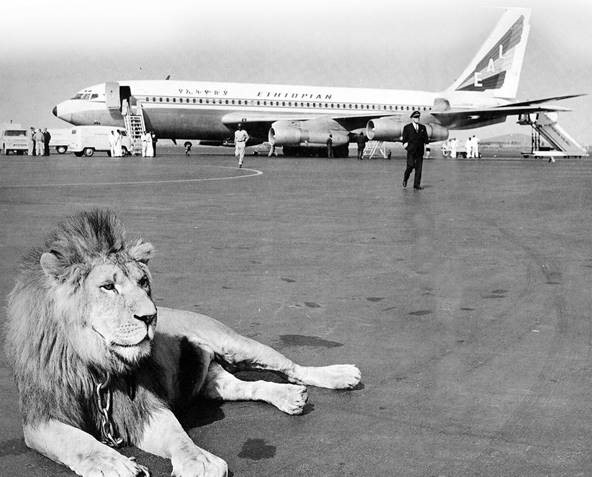
Ethiopian Airlines Boeing 707 with a black-maned Ethiopian lion, the national animal of the country.

Port Sudan was removed from the list of destinations on 1 March 1960. The airline had its first fatal accident on 15 July when a DC-3 crashed en route from Bulchi to Jimma, killing the pilot. A Convair 240 was sold to Allied Stores of Israel on 18 July. On 12 August, an order with Boeing for two Boeing 720B aircraft was placed. EAL's general manager had already brought the idea of acquiring two jet aircraft for long-haul operations up in February, suggesting the Boeing 720B. The Sud SE-210 Caravelle, the de Havilland D.H.106 Comet 4 and the Boeing 720B were all taken into account. Hot and high condition of some EAL operations made the Caravelle inappropriate, whereas the Comet was considered obsolete. The first east-west link made by an African airline started on 8 November, when the Addis Ababa–Accra–Lagos–Monrovia route was launched using DC-6B equipment.

The second fatal accident took place on 5 September 1961 when another DC-3 crashed shortly after takeoff from Sendafar; a flight attendant and four passengers lost their lives in the accident. The event urged the Civil Aviation Department to investigate the accidents. It was found that the lack of infrastructure at many airfields, marginal even for DC-3 operations, was a major contribution. Landing sites at Gore, Mizan Teferi and Tippi were included in the list of airfields that would require closure. On 13 January 1962, the crew and four passengers lost their lives in another accident involving a DC-3—registration ET-T-1, EAL's first aircraft of the type—this time the crash taking place at Tippi while the aircraft was taking off. The event prompted the government to decide to close the airfields at both Mizan Teferi and Tippi. In March 1962, two more DC-3s were acquired and registered ET-ABE and ET-ABF. During the year, the "ET-T-" registration would change to simply "ET-". Jack B. Asire became general manager in April 1962.

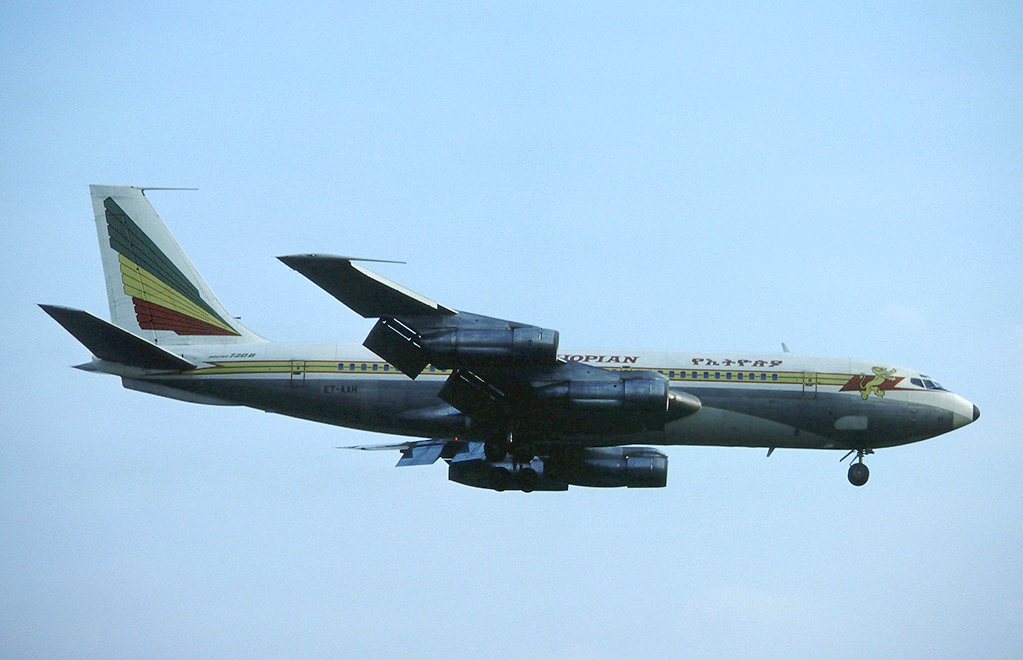
Ethiopian Airlines Boeing 720B in 1982

It was also decided to build a new airport to replace the Lideta Airfield, which was unable to accommodate the Boeing 720 jetliner the company intended to acquire. This was the birth of Bole International Airport, where the company set its headquarters.

In December 1962, the arrival of two Boeing 720s ordered directly from Boeing marked the carrier's entrance into the jet age. These two aircraft were registered ET-AAG and ET-AAH and were named the "Blue Nile" and "White Nile", respectively. The first jet service took place on 15 January 1963 when one of these aircraft was deployed on the route to Nairobi. The following day, a new service to Madrid was flown using the new jet equipment, with Frankfurt joining the jet network soon afterwards. On 1 April, the Boeing 720 replaced the DC-6B on the Addis Ababa–Athens route; during that month, the West African corridor also benefited from jet operations. The airline entered into a pool agreement with Aden Airways and Sudan Airways on the Khartoum–Asmara–Aden service. A new flight to Conakry was launched on 8 May 1963. Kano, which had been served since 18 March 1962, was removed from the list of destinations that day. On 30 November 1963, the airline lost another DC-3 (ET-AAT) in a test flight at Addis Ababa; the crew of three suffered minor injuries. Rome was served for the first time on 5 June 1964 on a weekly basis; the flight was routed via either Khartoum or Athens as part of a pool agreement with Alitalia.

Also in the early 1960s, the carrier provided some initial aviation support to the Ethiopia-United States Mapping Mission in its operation to acquire topographic maps of Ethiopia. The firm changed from a corporation to a share company in 1965 and changed its name from Ethiopian Air Lines to Ethiopian Airlines.

By 1966, the contractual relationship with TWA was adjusted to reflect the transfer of management with the appointment of an Ethiopian deputy general manager, and Col. Semret Medhane was appointed to the post. Two Boeing 720s were in operation and a Boeing 707-320C was due to be phased in by March 1968, when the carrier ordered a second -320C.

In 1970, the fifth renewal of the original 1945 contract changed TWA's role from manager to adviser. On its 25th anniversary in 1971, the company was ready to continue without foreign assistance. Since then, Ethiopian Airlines has been managed and staffed by Ethiopian personnel. The first Ethiopian General Manager was Col. Semret Medhane, appointed in 1971. Two Boeing 720Bs were acquired from Continental Airlines in 1973. In 1975, the carrier ordered five Dash 7s. By then, Ethiopian Airlines had ended its 30-year relationship with TWA. The airline became a new customer for the Boeing 727 in 1978, ordering two. The 727s arrived in the late 1970s as a replacement for the oldest Boeing 720s.

=== The 1980s and 1990s ===
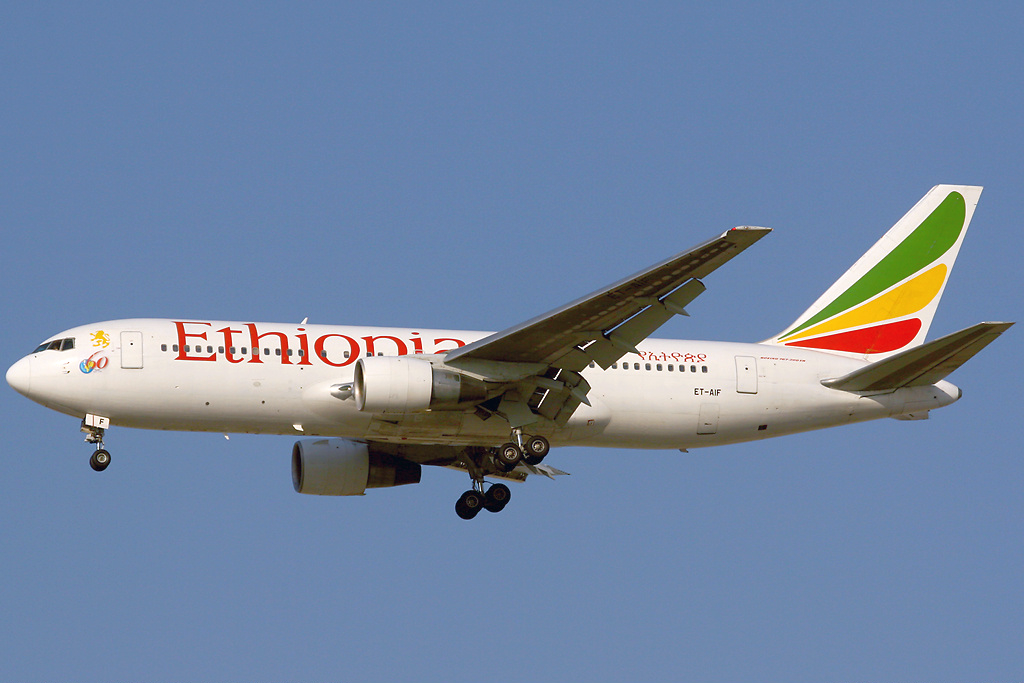
Ethiopian Airlines Boeing 767-200ER in 2006

The DHC-5 Buffalo entered Ethiopian's fleet in the early 1980s. In 1982, Ethiopian became the first African carrier in ordering the Boeing 767, as well as the first airline to order the Boeing 767-200ER. On 1 June 1984, the first of these aircraft set a new distance record for a twinjet, flying 12,100 km (7,500 mi) non-stop from Washington, D.C. to Addis Ababa, on delivery to the company. The Boeing 767-200ERs came to replace the remaining Boeing 720s. ATR 42s and Twin Otters were incorporated into the fleet in the mid-1980s, with the first of six Twin Otters entering the fleet in early 1985. The Boeing 737-200 joined the fleet in late 1987.

In 1990 the carrier secured a $90 million credit through the AfDB to expand the main airport in the capital. Ethiopian became the first passenger airline in taking delivery of the Boeing 757 Freighter, receiving the first of five Boeing 757-200s in 1991. By 1996 the airline was flying to Bangkok, Beijing, Durban and Johannesburg; routes to Ivory Coast and Senegal were also being operated. The Fokker 50 entered the fleet to operate domestic routes; Ethiopian became the last company to take delivery of this aircraft in 1997, just after the collapse of Fokker due to financial problems. In the late 1990s the carrier saw the incorporation of Copenhagen and Maputo to its international network, as well as New York City and Washington, D.C. as transatlantic destinations; the frequent-flyer programme, named "Sheba Miles" after the legendary Queen of Sheba, was launched too. In 1998, the airline's flights to the Eritrean capital Asmara were disrupted when a war erupted between the two countries.

=== 2000 – present ===
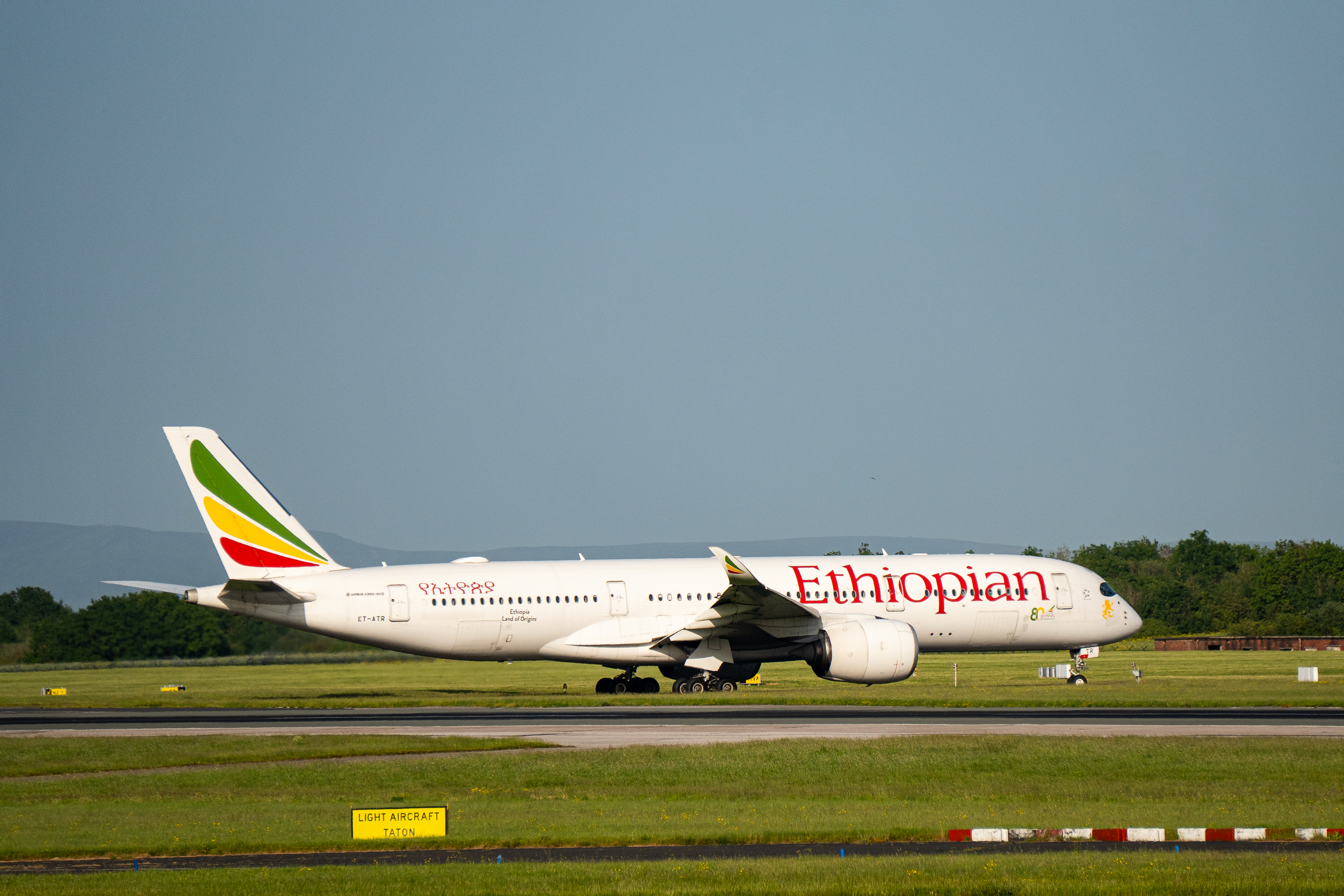
Ethiopian Airlines A350 at Manchester Airport

A fleet renewal started in the early 2000s, with the incorporation of the Boeing 737-700 and the Boeing 767-300ER; The airline discontinued its service to Newark in favour of serving Washington, D.C. in 2004. In the late 2000s the airline announced it would be the launch customer of the Boeing 787 Dreamliner, (Note: However, this did not happen. All Nippon Airways was the launch customer for this aircraft.) and placed orders to acquire new Airbus A350-900s, Boeing 777-200LRs and Bombardier equipment.

In late September 2010, Ethiopian Airlines was invited to join Star Alliance under the mentoring of Lufthansa. The carrier became a member of the alliance in December 2011, the third Africa-based carrier to do so—following EgyptAir and South African Airways—and the 28th member worldwide.

In 2024, Ethiopia offered the unrecognised country of Somaliland equity in the airline in exchange for the use of a Somaliland port. On 20 January 2025, Ethiopia announced that the airline will be launching flights between Addis Ababa and Hyderabad, offering three weekly flights on its Boeing 737 MAX 8 aircraft.

== Corporate affairs ==
=== Business trends ===
Performance figures for the government-owned Ethiopian Airlines are available in their Annual Reports and occasional press reports. Available recent trends are (as of year ending 30 June):

Year	Turnover (US$ bn)	Net profit (US$ m)	Number of employees (Note: at year end)	Number of passengers (m)	Passenger load factor (%) (Note: figures for the calendar year)	Number of destinations	Cargo carried (000s tonnes)	Number of aircraft (Note: at year end)	Refs
2008	0.97	53.9	4,896	2.5		52	72.7	35	
2009	1.1	127	5,075	2.8		56	100	36	
2010	1.2	123	5,555	3.1	72.0	60	134	43	
2011	1.5	75.1	6,129	3.7	71.0	65	160	46	
2012	1.9	41.8	6,557	4.6	71.5	68	180	48	
2013	2.0	110	7,390	5.2	71.4	73	174	58	
2014	2.3	162	8,066	5.9	70.4	82	186	66	
2015	2.4	172	8,977	6.3	68.5	84	236	76	
2016	2.5	284	10,277	7.6	67.9	88	266	77	
2017	2.6	234	11,284	8.7	71.2	95	338	87	
2018	3.3	207	12,994	10.6	74	113	400	108	
2019	3.9	260	13,958	12.1	73	121	432	116	
2020	3.7	183	14,104	9.6	53	127	525	126	
2021	3.5	493	14,736	5.7	57	127	757	130	
2022	5.0	942	17,000	8.6	70	131	768	144	
2023	6.1	941	17,577	13.8	71.0	136	713	154	
2024	7.0	1,053	17,591	17.1	73.4	161	754	156	

=== Management and ownership ===
The airline, which is wholly owned by the Government of Ethiopia, has traditionally been unfettered by government intervention, even during times of significant turmoil and domestic hardship. Whereas many African state-owned airlines were and remain often poorly run, with staffings often serving nepotistic purposes, and business decisions being made on political grounds, Ethiopian Airlines remained professionally run and managed, leading The Christian Science Monitor to term it in 1988 a "capitalist success in Marxist Ethiopia".

The Derg, after expanding the airline's workforce, which had resulted in a decline in service quality and revenues, allowed the airline to be run on a "strictly commercial basis". The carrier had gone through a period of difficulties pending the nomination of Captain Mohammed Ahmed, who would be CEO throughout the entire 1980s, and slashed the workforce by 10%. The airline continued the acquisition of Western, rather than Soviet aircraft, despite the links between the communist government and the Soviet Union, purchasing the Boeing 727 in 1979 and the Boeing 767 in 1984. Despite famine, unfavourable exchange rates, and general economic disarray, the airline managed to retain its reputation, particularly in the provision of maintenance and training. The Financial Times noted that it managed to remain one of the most profitable airlines in Africa throughout the decade.

Despite the violent overthrow of the communist government by the Ethiopian People's Revolutionary Democratic Front in 1991, the airline managed to post a profit for the fiscal year. In 1994, 40 top executives including the general manager Capt. Zelleke Demissie were fired after they signed a letter rebuking a government report, and a new general manager from outside the industry, Ahmed Kellow, was appointed. The airline would regain operational independence when longtime company veteran Bisrat Nigatu was appointed to the top post in 1997, and remained fiscally sound, despite disruptions caused by the Eritrean-Ethiopian War.

In 2018 it was announced that the Ethiopian government would partially or wholly privatise several state-owned enterprises, amongst them Ethiopian Airlines, although it would retain a majority stake in key firms, including the airline. The CEO at the time suggested other African states like Nigeria purchase a minority stake in the airline. In October 2020, the Ministry of Finance postponed the planned privatisation of the state-owned airline.

As of August 2026, the CEO position is held by Mesfin Tasew, who was appointed by the airline's board of directors in March 2022. Mesfin has been working at Ethiopian Airlines since 1984. He also was the CEO of Asky Airlines, a strategic partner of Ethiopian Airlines. Before that, Tewolde GebreMariam served as the airline's Group CEO from 2011 until his resignation in March 2022.

=== Organisation ===
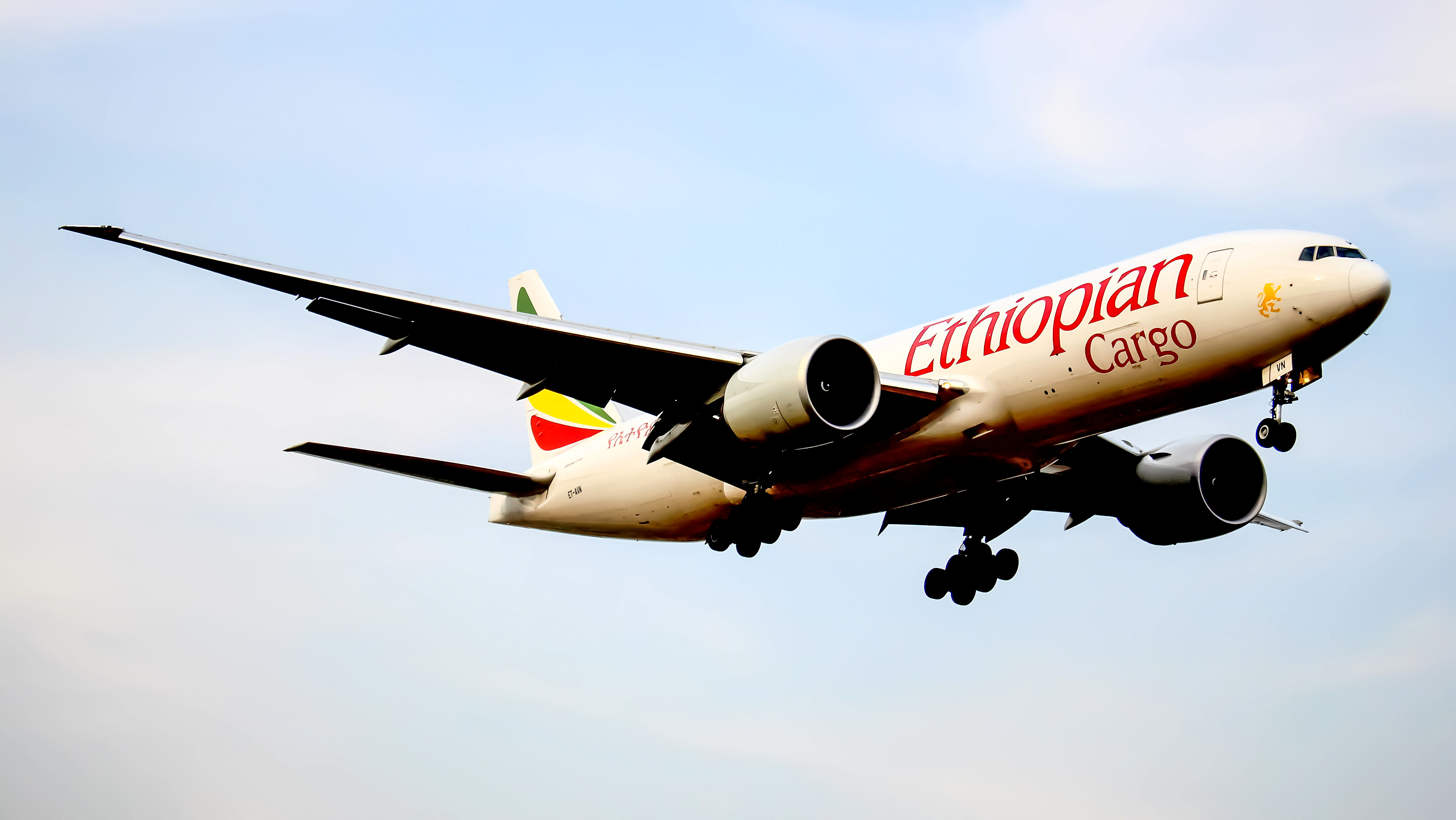
Ethiopian Airlines ET-AVN Boeing 777F Cargo

The Ethiopian government reorganised the airline as a fully owned aviation holding group in July 2017. The aim was to maximise efficiency, enhance customer service to a global standard, and ease longterm planning. The initial group consisted of: The Ethiopian Airports Enterprise (EAE), the Passenger Airline company, Cargo Airline, and Logistics Company, Ethiopian Aviation Academy, Ethiopian In-flight Catering Services, Ethiopian MRO Services, and Ethiopian Hotel and Tourism Services. The MRO Services is the largest such operation serving the continent and the Med-Eastern region; fully accredited by FAA and EASA. The Cargo and Logistical division is expanding to increase annual capacity to 1.5 million tons. Ethiopian Aviation Academy (now upgraded to Aviation University) inaugurated a second campus for pilot training in Hawassa city in 2023.

=== Head office ===
Ethiopian Airlines currently has its head office at Bole International Airport, Addis Ababa, but intends to build a new head office facility. A contest for the design was held in 2009, but none of those plans were proceeded with. On 16 February 2011, it held a second round, and in September 2011 it was announced that BET Architect Plc won the contest. The airline stated that the estimated Br300 million complex will be constructed on a 50,000 m^{2} (540,000 sq ft) plot at Bole International Airport. The company that received 4th place in the competition's second round has threatened to take legal action, accusing the airline of not giving due consideration to the proposed design.

=== Strategic ambitions and landmarks ===
The airline was featured by The Economist as an example of excellence in late 1987, and economist Paul B. Henze recognised it in 2000 as being "one of the most reliable and profitable airlines in the Third World". In July 2011, Ethiopian was named Africa's most profitable airline for the year 2010 by Air Transport World, and it has also been praised by AFRAA for its sustained profitability over recent years.

As a long-term company policy, in addition to the carrier's main activities, revenues are also generated by providing aircraft maintenance to foreign airlines, and specialist training for both Ethiopian and foreign trainees. Every year, pilots and technicians graduate from both the Pilot School, inaugurated in 1964, and the Aviation Maintenance Technician School, established in 1967. The American Federal Aviation Administration accredited the airline's maintenance division with licence No. ETIY 102F.

Ethiopian Airlines started Vision 2010 in 2005, which aimed to increase passenger traffic to 3 million, revenue to US$1 billion and employees to 6,000 by 2010. By 2010, Ethiopian had exceeded all goals set in Vision 2010, and the company's net profit for the fiscal year ended 2010-6-30 was US$121.4 million. The results were attributed in part to an aggressive marketing campaign and major cost-cutting measures.

In 2010, Ethiopian adopted Vision 2025, a 15-year development strategy, under which the airline anticipated increasing its fleet to 120, the number of destinations to 90, carrying more than 18 million passengers and 720,000 tonnes (790,000 short tons) of cargo, with 17,000 employees. Vision 2025 also considered a fourfold expansion of the capacity building for trainees in the airline's aviation academy. Ethiopian achieved its vision 2025 well ahead of time in 2018, with an average growth rate of 25% throughout the decade, a fleet size of 126, and 127 destinations during the 2019/2020 FY. Its net profit in the 2018/19 financial year rose to 260 million USD, while its operating revenue rose to 4 billion USD – figures unmatched by any other carrier on the continent. Tewolde GebreMariam, the then Group CEO, told The Africa Report "Some of the targets we set in 2010 to be achieved by 2025, we achieved by 2016." In 2021/22 FY, the airline posted a revenue of 5 billion USD — a 79% growth compared to the previous year and achieved a 90% growth in profit, culminating in a total of 937 million USD "despite the headwinds of worsening global economic outlook, rising fuel cost and global pandemic".

Having met its 15-year strategic plan Vision 2025 ahead of time, Ethiopian has charted out a more ambitious strategic roadmap called Vision 2035 to further bolster its continuous growth. With this new roadmap, Ethiopian plans to nearly double the fleet size from 145 to 271, and to increase from 133 to 207 international destinations. It aims to increase its passenger traffic from 14 million in 2022 to 65 million passengers in 2035. It has also planned to grow its cargo from 723,000 tons in 2022 to 3 million tons/year. The airline aims to generate 25 billion USD in revenue by the end of the roadmap as compared to 6.1 billion USD in 2022 FY. The overarching goal of Vision 2035 is to position Ethiopian Airlines among the top 20 aviation groups globally.

The airline announced in 2020, its plans to build a new 6 billion dollar mega-airport with the capacity to handle 100 million passengers a year. The new airport will be built in Bishoftu, 38 km south of Addis Ababa. Though existing Bole International Airport in Addis Ababa has undergone massive expansion in 2019, from just 7 million to a capacity of 22 million passengers per year, it is still significantly below the airline's projected capacity demands. Therefore, the new airport is needed to take the pressure off the existing airport as passenger travel grows. Addis Ababa Bole International Airport has taken the crown from Dubai International Airport, in 2018, as the gateway to and from Africa travel.

Ethiopian ordered 67 Boeing aircraft Including 737 MAX & 787 Dreamliners at the Dubai Air Show, in 2023 making it the largest-ever purchase of Boeing airplanes in African history. The order is consistent with the airlines' Vision 2035 roadmap. It has also committed to buy 11 additional Airbus A350-900s with six more purchase rights. The 737 MAX aircraft order came nearly five years after one of the airline's fatal 2019 MAX aircraft crash that led to the grounding of the global fleet. Group CEO of Ethiopian Airlines Mesfin Tasew stated; "We have renewed our confidence in that aircraft. We believe we have checked and confirmed that the design defect of that aircraft has been fully corrected by Boeing." A 2023 report from Brand Finance, a global brand valuation and strategy consultancy firm, listed Ethiopian Airlines as one of the world's top 50 most valuable and strongest airline brands ahead of Juneyao Air, Hawaiian Airlines, Jetstar and Spring Airlines. The firm named Ethiopian Airlines "the fastest-growing airline brand globally, (brand value up 79% to US$498 million)" and "Africa's largest airline brand" with Qatar Airways as its significant challenger (brand value up 23% to US$2.5 billion).

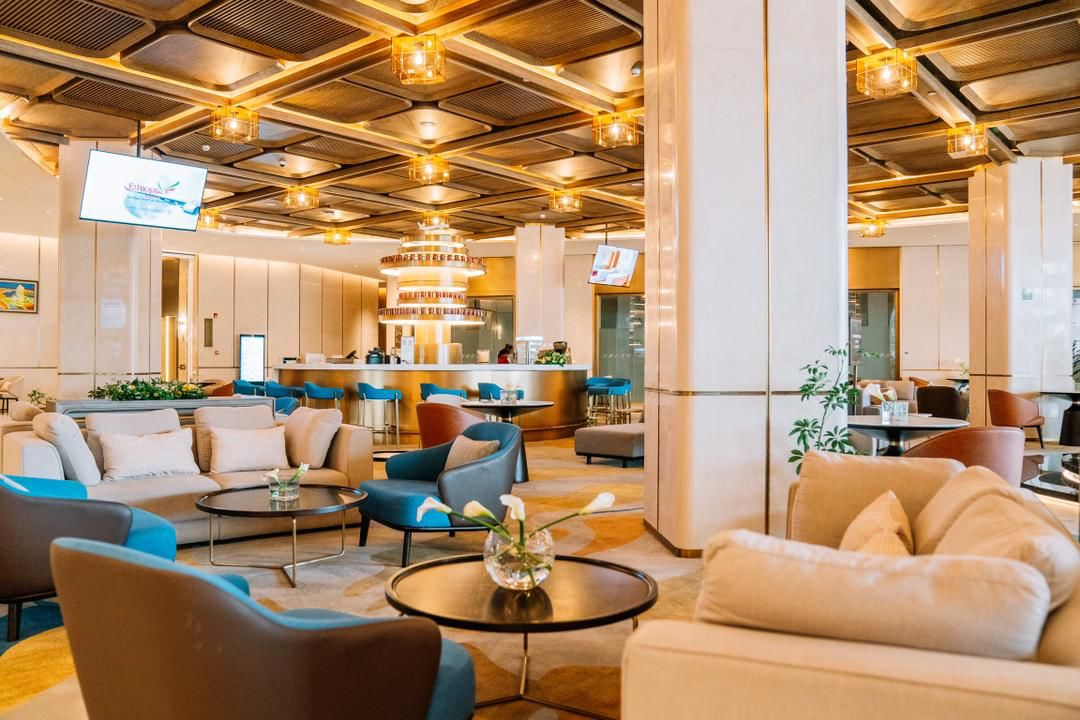
The Skylight Hotel in Addis Ababa owned by Ethiopian Airlines

=== Forging strategic partnerships ===
Ethiopian signed in July 2013 a deal for the acquisition of 49% of the Malawian carrier. The new airline was named Malawi Airlines. The remaining 51% shareholding held by the government of Malawi and private Malawian investors. Malawi Airlines started operations in January 2014. For the operation year 2013–14, Ethiopian Airlines was ranked the most profitable airline in Africa and the 18th most profitable airline in the world with a profit of $228 million.

In January 2018, Ethiopian signed a strategic partnership agreement with the Zambian government to assist in the relaunch of Zambia Airways. The airline has a 45% stake in the airline; the rest of the shares are held by the Zambian government. This move is aimed at developing Lusaka as an aviation hub for Southern Africa and fits with the airline's multiple hub strategy outlined in its 15-year Vision 2025 strategic plan.

In February 2018, Ethiopian and its Togo-based regional airline partner ASKY Airlines formed a strategic partnership with the Guinean government to establish a startup carrier Guinea Airlines by June. This partnership is in line with the airline's 15-year Vision 2025 strategic plan to establish strategic partnerships with many African countries, enabling them to regain market share for travel. It is also in line with the recently launched African Single Air Transport Market.

Ethiopian Cargo and Logistics Services has formed a joint venture entity with DHL, DHL-Ethiopian Airlines Logistics Services S.C. in 2018. The focus of the new company will be providing ground logistics to and from airports, seaports, and the rapidly expanding industrial parks of the region. The company is based in Ethiopia and carries out business all over Africa. The company has opened a container freight station, an 800 sqm facility at Modjo Dry Port, close to the capital, Addis Ababa. Ethiopian Cargo, the largest air cargo service provider in Africa, is building Africa's largest and first of its kind e-commerce hub at $50 million cost at its facility in Addis Ababa Bole International Airport. Upon completion, the e-commerce hub will be equipped with an automated sortation system and electronic transport vehicles (ETV) to handle up to 23 million parcels per annum (150,000 tons per year) of shipments ranging from small parcels to boxes, skids, and built-up units. The airline has also partnered with postal firm MailAmericas, a Latin American company, to develop cross-border e-commerce services within Africa and the Middle East using Addis Ababa as a hub. The tie-up will see Ethiopian Airlines offer MailAmericas its air transport services for carrying goods across its network. As part of the partnership, Ethiopian Airlines will gain access to all bilateral agreements and private networks of MailAmericas, enabling it to offer services to customers in Africa, Latin America, Europe, the Middle East, and other parts of the world.

The business growth continued with an announcement, in April 2018, of a planned aerospace manufacturing facility. There is a small existing unit, under Ethiopian MRO Services, that manufactures wire harnesses for Boeing. The new division, a joint venture with Aerosud of South Africa, will be capable of designing, and manufacturing, aircraft parts for plane makers. Negotiations are underway with Boeing, Honeywell, Airbus, and Bombardier Aerospace among others in search of clients. Accreditation will be sought from the FAA and EASA. The needed human resources will be groomed from the local technical schools and higher learning institutions. In July 2018, Ethiopian Airlines signed an agreement with German ACM Aerospace to set up a facility that will manufacture and supply aircraft seat covers, safety belts, carpets, and other interior parts. In 2023, the airline has signed a deal with the Ethiopian Investment Commission (EIC) and the Ethiopian Industrial Parks Development Corporation (IPDC) to build a new hangar in Addis Ababa for aircraft parts manufacturing through a joint venture with Boeing. The facility will be used to manufacture aerospace parts, including aircraft thermo-acoustic insulation blankets, electrical wire harnesses, and other parts. Ethiopian airlines had inaugurated a manufacturing facility in Addis Ababa in September 2022, to produce insulation blankets for Boeing 737 MAX aircraft in a joint venture with Italy's Geven-SkyTecno. Ethiopian Airlines holds 51% and SkyTecno 49% of the new Joint venture company called "Ethiopian Sky Technologies" which intends to make the aerospace manufacturing company one of the key strategic business units of the airline alongside Ethiopian International flights, Ethiopian Express (domestic), Ethiopian Cargo and Logistics services, Ethiopian MRO, Ethiopian Aviation University, Ethiopian In-flight Catering, Ethiopian Skylight Hotel, Ethiopian airports, and Ethiopian Ground Services.

In 2021, the Ethiopian MRO facility in collaboration with Israel Aerospace Industries established a Passenger to Freighter Conversion Site for Boeing 767-300 Aircraft. The conversion site is to provide solutions in the field of converting passenger aircraft to cargo configuration, aircraft maintenance, and overhaul, staff training and guidance, as well as assistance in acquiring certification and licenses. The site, the largest and the first of its kind in the continent, completed its Boeing B767 freighter conversion in 2022, the first of the airline's three similar aircraft due to be converted. After the start of the Covid pandemic, Ethiopian temporarily converted around 25 of its widebody passenger aircraft into freighters using its in-house MRO capability. The initiative boosted its cargo operations and enabled it to transport around 1bn doses of the COVID-19 vaccine worldwide.

Ethiopian Airlines launched a Mozambican subsidiary, Ethiopian Mozambique Airlines, in December 2018. The carrier competed with LAM Mozambique Airlines and Fastjet in the country's domestic market. However, in May 2021, Ethiopian Mozambique Airlines ceased operations indefinitely citing as reason a drastic drop in domestic travel demand due to COVID-19 pandemic.

In January 2021, Ethiopian Airlines signed an interline agreement with South African carriers CemAir and Airlink to allow passengers to travel with a single ticket and lower fare tickets between points within the carriers' networks.

== Destinations ==
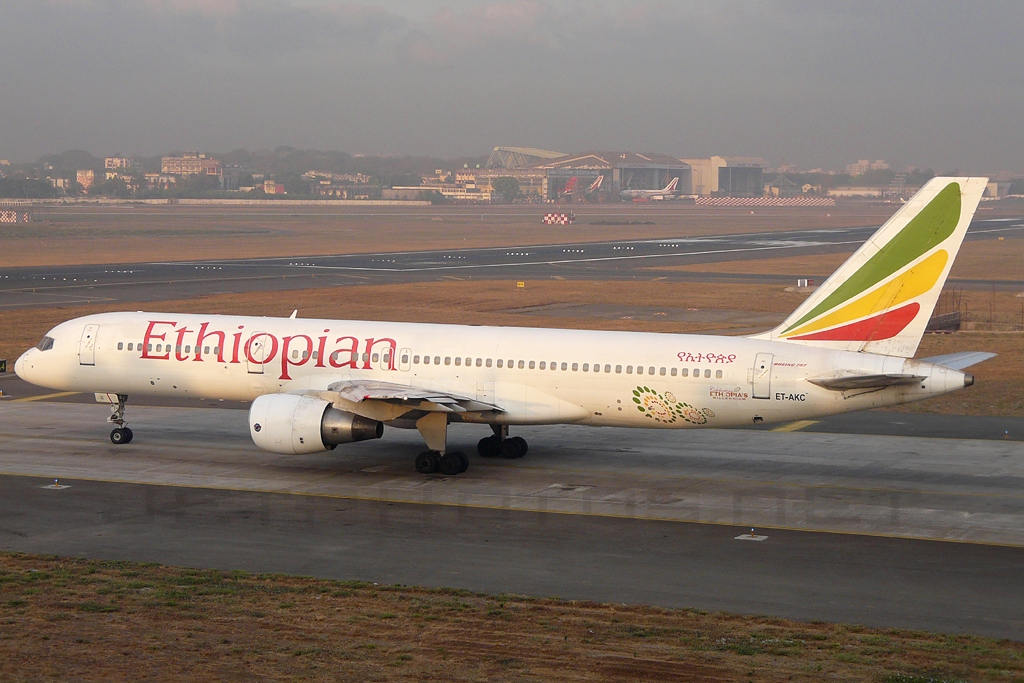
A Boeing 757-200 at Mumbai Airport.

As of January 2026, the carrier served 145 international, 22 domestic passenger destinations, and 70 cargo destinations. Ethiopian serves 65 destinations in Africa, more than any other airline. As of April 2013, the carrier's five densest routes were Addis Ababa–Dubai, Addis Ababa–Johannesburg, Addis Ababa–Guangzhou, Addis Ababa–Nairobi and Addis Ababa–Beijing.

In late April 2012, the airline said it planned to start serving the Latin American market but no firm dates were disclosed. In August that year, Abuja, Accra, Douala, Dubai, Entebbe, Frankfurt, Harare, Johannesburg, Kilimanjaro, Lagos, Lomé, London, Luanda, Lusaka, Malabo, Maputo, Mombasa, Mumbai, Nairobi and Rome would be served on a rotational basis with the first Boeing 787 Dreamliner, and that upon delivery of the second aircraft of the type these would be assigned on fixed scheduled routes.

In February 2013, unofficial reports disclosed the carrier's plans to launch new services to Ho Chi Minh City, Manila and Seoul (Note: There was an official confirmation for the commencement of services to this destination in May 2013.) starting in June of the same year, as well as the company's intention to start flying the 9,899-nautical-mile-long (18,333 km) São Paulo–Lomé–Addis Ababa–Guangzhou run in July 2013. In June 2013, unofficial sources reported that the launch of flights to both Ho Chi Minh City and Manila were cancelled and that they would be replaced with a flight to Singapore starting in September 2013; as announced, flights to Rio de Janeiro and São Paulo commenced in July the same year. Flights to Singapore were launched in December 2013. A new link to Shanghai was launched in March 2014, while new services to Vienna started in June 2014 and to Doha in December the same year.

Tokyo-Narita was added on 20 April 2015. Other new destinations are Los Angeles (the carrier's fifth point to be served in the Americas) and Dublin. A new service to Manila was launched in July 2015. The Addis Ababa–Lomé–Newark run commenced on 3 July 2016.

Buenos Aires became the second stop for the airline in the continent starting on 8 March 2018 as an addition to the existing Addis Ababa-São Paulo run. The list of cargo destinations has grown with the recent addition of: Los Angeles, Mexico City, and three additional cities in Africa. The daily uplift now stands at 650 tons. The plan, by 2025, is to grow the service points to 57 with a fleet of 18 aircraft, having the capacity to uplift 1.5 million tons annually.

Nosy-Be became the second stop, after Antananarivo, in Madagascar starting on 27 March 2018. The thrice-weekly service will be an outbound extension of the existing connection to the Comoros with a direct return to Addis Ababa. On the same day Kisangani and Mbuji Mayi, in the DRC, joined the Ethiopian network; bringing the total points served in Africa to 58.

As part of normalising relations between Ethiopia and Eritrea, the carrier restored service to the latter's capital Asmara on 18 July 2018.

In France, after Paris and Marseille, the company launched a scheduled route between Addis Ababa and Lyon in July 2026.

=== Alliances and codeshare agreements ===
==== Alliances ====
In October 2007, Ethiopian Airlines' frequent flyer programme ShebaMiles and Lufthansa's Miles & More entered into partnership, allowing members of each programme to earn and spend miles on both airlines' networks. In July 2008, the carrier entered a strategic partnership with Lomé-based start-up airline ASKY Airlines, in which Ethiopian holds a 40% stake. Ethiopian Airlines is responsible for aircraft maintenance and operational management. The plan is to turn Lomé into Ethiopian Airline's regional hub for the West African market. ASKY started operations in January 2010 and became profitable after a few months. Ethiopian officially joined Star Alliance in December 2011.

==== Codeshare agreements ====
Ethiopian Airlines has codeshare agreements with the following airlines:

- Aegean Airlines
- Air Canada
- Air China
- Air Côte d'Ivoire
- Air Europa
- Air India
- All Nippon Airways
- Asiana Airlines
- ASKY Airlines
- Austrian Airlines
- Azul Brazilian Airlines
- China Southern Airlines
- EgyptAir
- El Al
- Etihad Airways
- Flynas
- ITA Airways
- Kuwait Airways
- LAM Mozambique Airlines
- Lufthansa
- Malawi Airlines
- Malaysia Airlines
- Oman Air
- RwandAir
- Saudia
- Scandinavian Airlines
- Shenzhen Airlines
- Singapore Airlines
- South African Airways
- SriLankan Airlines
- TAP Air Portugal
- Turkish Airlines
- United Airlines
- Zambia Airways

== Fleet ==
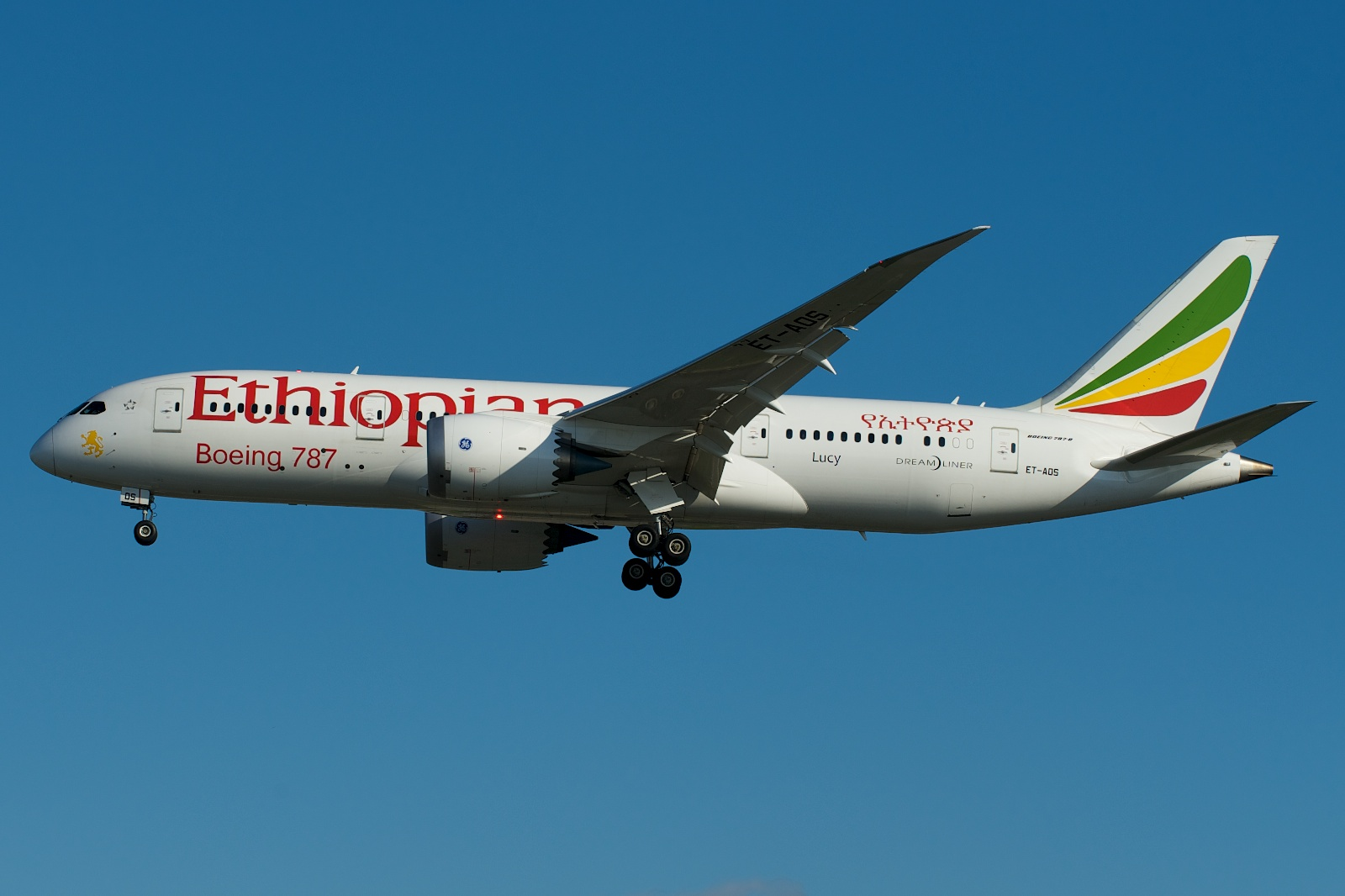
Ethiopian Airlines Boeing 787-8

=== Recent developments ===
In February 2005, Ethiopian Airlines signed a preliminary agreement to buy up to ten Boeing 787 Dreamliners (five firm orders plus five options), becoming the first African carrier to order 787s. On 31 May 2005, Boeing announced that Ethiopian had exercised its purchase rights and confirmed a firm order for ten aircraft. The carrier was the first African airline to order and to operate the Boeing 777-200LR. and took possession of its first (the 900th delivered 777 model) in November 2010. Ethiopian Airlines was also the first African airline to begin operating the Airbus A350 aircraft in 2016. On 14 November 2023 at the Dubai Airshow, Ethiopian Airlines ordered 31 Boeing aircraft, including 20 737 MAXs and 11 787-9s. On 15 November 2023 at the Dubai Airshow, Ethiopian Airlines ordered 11 more Airbus A350s to its fleet, expanding its current order for this type to 33 aircraft. On 5 March 2024, Ethiopian Airlines and Boeing announced an agreement for the purchase of eight 777-9 passenger aircraft, with the option for an additional 12. The agreement secures its position as the launch customer for the Boeing 777X in Africa.

== Services ==
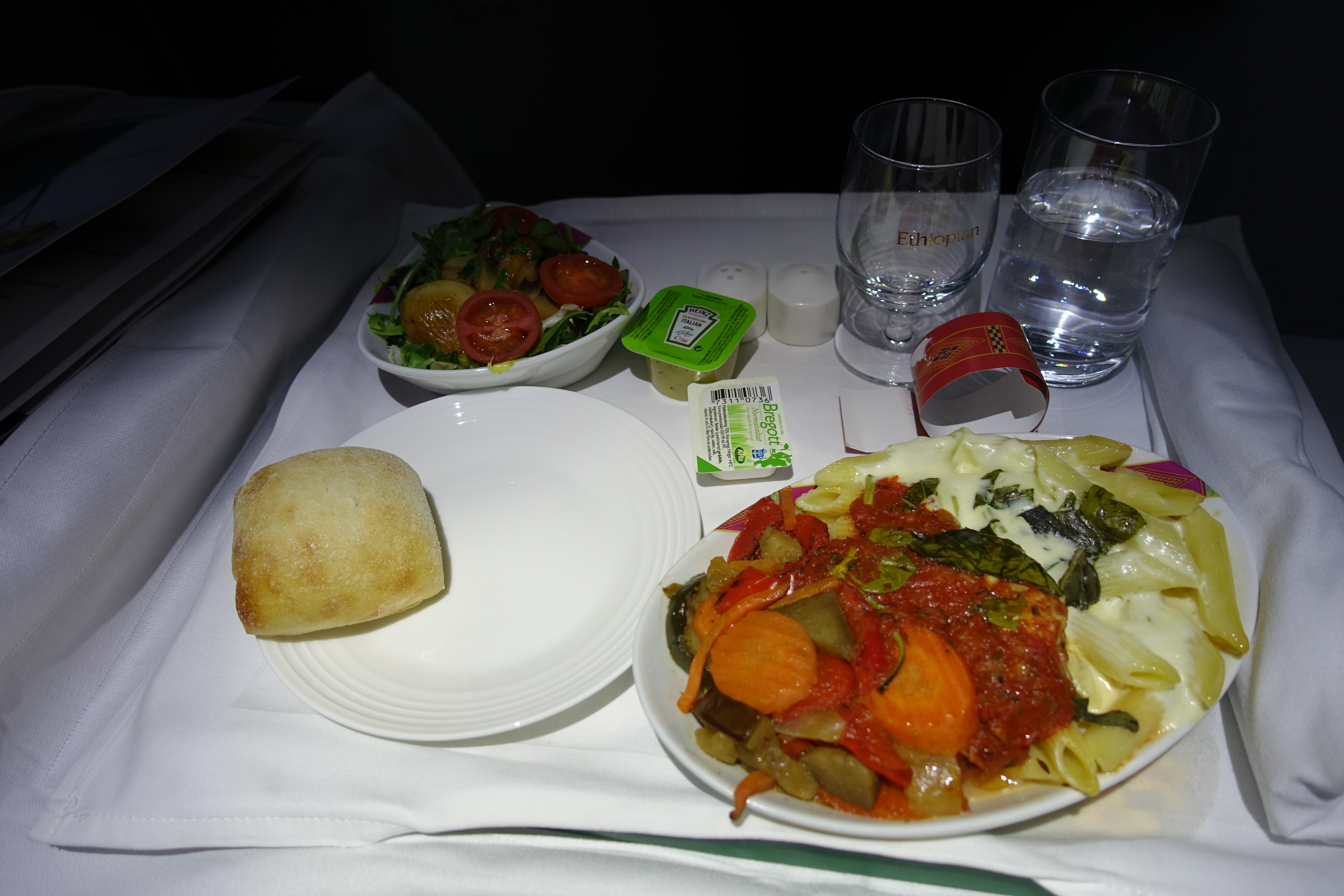
Business class meal on Ethiopian Airlines

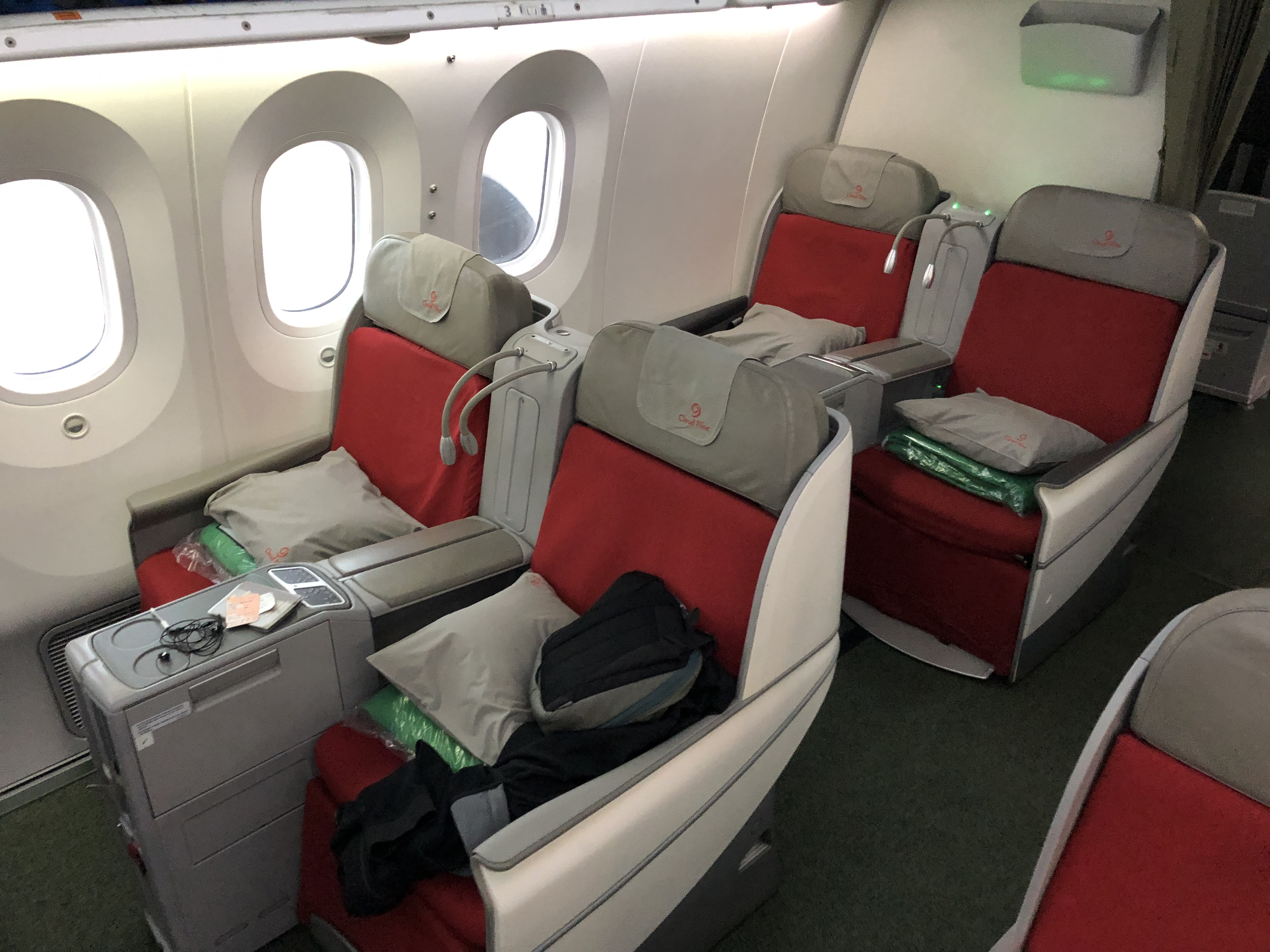
Business Class seats onboard a Boeing 787 Dreamliner.

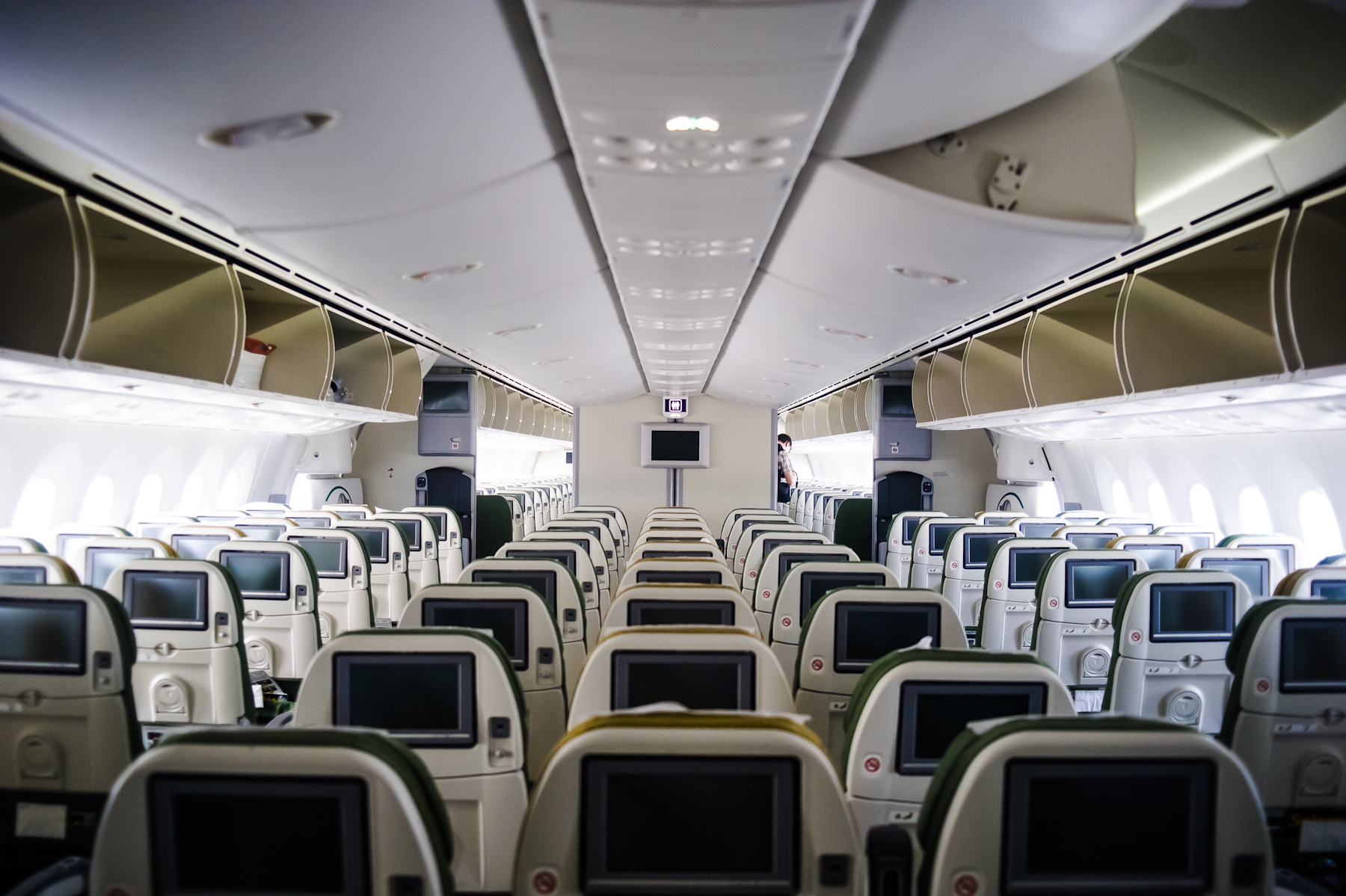
Economy Class cabin on board a Boeing 787 Dreamliner.

Cloud Nine and Economy Class are the two classes available on most of Ethiopian Airlines' flights, but not on all-economy-layout Dash 8s.

=== Food and drinks ===
On all flights, passengers are provided with food and complimentary beverages onboard, in both classes. The food service consists of hot meals, hot or cold snacks, or light refreshments, depending on the length of the flight and the time of the day. The choice of acquiring special drinks at an extra cost is available too. The airline also offers assorted menus for passengers having special meal requirements.

=== In-flight entertainment ===
==== Cloud Nine ====
Ethiopian Airlines' business class is named Cloud Nine. Passengers travelling in this class are provided with onboard amenities and a wide variety of reading material. On routes operated with Boeing 777-200LR equipment passengers are provided with sleeper seats and on-demand audio and video services, with 85 channels on 15.4 inch IFE screens.

=== Economy Class ===
A variety of meals — ranging from light snacks to hot dishes — and amenities are provided to passengers flying in this class, depending upon the length of the flight. Reclining seats and on-demand audio and video, with 80 channels and 8.9-inch screens, are available on Boeing 777-200LR services.

=== Lounges ===
Ethiopian Airlines passengers are offered two lounges at Bole International Airport. Cloud Nine passengers can wait for the departure of flights at the Cloud Nine Lounge, where they are provided with a wide variety of amenities, as well as personal computers or wireless connection. Likewise, ShebaMiles cardholders with Gold or Silver status can make use of the Sheba Miles Lounge facilities.

== Accidents and incidents ==
According to the Aviation Safety Network records for Ethiopian Airlines, the airline has had 61 accidents and incidents since 1965, plus six more for Ethiopian Air Lines, the airline's former name. As of March 2019, these occurrences resulted in 494 deaths. On 10 March 2019, Ethiopian Airlines Flight 302, a 4-month-old Boeing 737 MAX 8 crashed shortly after takeoff from Addis Ababa en route to Nairobi, killing all 157 people on board from more than 30 different nations. Before the 2019 accident, a hijacking was the carrier's deadliest accident when an aircraft crashed into the Indian Ocean due to fuel starvation in 1996. The third-deadliest accident occurred in 2010, when an aircraft crashed into the Mediterranean Sea shortly after it departed Beirut–Rafic Hariri International Airport, killing all 90 people on board. The crash of a Boeing 737-200 in 1988 led to 35 fatalities and is the fourth deadliest accident experienced by the company.

== Controversies ==
=== Ethnic profiling allegations ===
In November and December 2020, Ethiopian Airlines was accused of banning or placing on leave those who are ethnic Tigrayans, in relation to the Tigray War. The company denied the allegation, stating no employee was "suspended or terminated due to their ethnic background". A December 2020 article in The New York Times claimed the airlines' CEO, Tewolde Gebremariam, who is of Tigrayan origin, was also banned from leaving Ethiopia after the Tigray War started. Tewolde (Note: Ethiopian names do not have family names, so Ethiopian people are addressed by their given names.) has been seen and interviewed at international events in October 2021.

=== CNN allegations of military activities ===
A CNN investigation alleged that cargo aircraft belonging to the airline transported weapons to airports in Eritrea during the Tigray War. The airline billed Ethiopia's Ministry of Defense at least six times in November 2020. The article's reporter claimed that using civil aircraft to "smuggle" military weapons violates international aviation law. However, CNN aviation analyst Mary Schiavo explained in a subsequent interview that it is not a violation of international law for commercial airlines to provide cargo services to governments in times of war. Ethiopian Airlines denied transporting weapons for the war and stated the goods transported were "food stuff and refill". On 7 October 2021, a since-deleted post on Ethiopian Airlines' Facebook page quoted the CEO as saying the airline had started an investigation of "treasonous" employees and that the airline "will continue fulfilling demands of the government. The airline later stated that the Facebook account was temporarily compromised and the posted statement was fake.

==== Government possible involvement regarding China-Airline stake ====
In 2023, Girma Wake, the airlines's current chairman and former CEO of the airlines: has resigned, and has been replaced by current Ethiopian Airforce Marshal Yilma Merdassa. This has been speculated that Prime Minister Abiy Ahmed replaced such a key airline figure because Girma denied the PM's purpose to sell the airline's cargo department to China. When asked regarding the replacement of civilian board chairman by a military officer, the Ethiopian GCEO said "that would not change how the airline conducts its business. Ethiopian Airlines executive management is intact. We don't anticipate any change. The new chairman will not alter that. We'll work with him; he's a pilot, and he knows about aviation, but from the military side. We don't expect the Air Force chief to intervene or interfere in our day-to-day management."

=== Transportation of wild animals ===
In 2021, Ethiopian Airlines was one of a handful of carriers accused in a World Animal Protection report of involvement in the global export of live wild-caught animals, including species of ‘high biosecurity concern’, such as bats and primates. The NGO reported concerns that Ethiopia Airlines in particular was not operating in compliance with International Air Transportation Association (IATA) Live Animal Regulations.

In 2024, PETA launched a campaign against the carrier's alleged treatment of animals, and two PETA representatives and an 11-year-old boy were detained by Ethiopian authorities for over 24 hours after planning a protest outside the carrier's headquarters in Addis Ababa in July. Shortly thereafter, Ethiopian Airlines CEO Mesfin Tasew stated that the airline has been transporting live animals, such as monkeys, sheep, goats, fish, cows, and bulls, in full compliance with international aviation laws and regulations. "We transport live animals as long as payment is effected and they are transported by a legal entity," he said.

== See also ==
- List of airlines of Ethiopia
- Transport in Ethiopia

== Bibliography ==
- Bringing Africa togheter-The story of Ethiopian Airlines. Addis Ababa: Ethiopian Airlines. 1988.
- Guttery, Ben R. (1998). Encyclopedia of African Airlines. Jefferson, NC: McFarland & Company. ISBN 978-0-7864-0495-7.
- Mols, Jozef (2022). Ethiopian Airlines-The African aviation powerhouse. Airlines Series, Vol. 2. Stamford, Lincs, UK: Key Publishing. ISBN 9781802820027.
