= Jenifer Bamuturaki =

Ugandan businesswoman and corporate executive

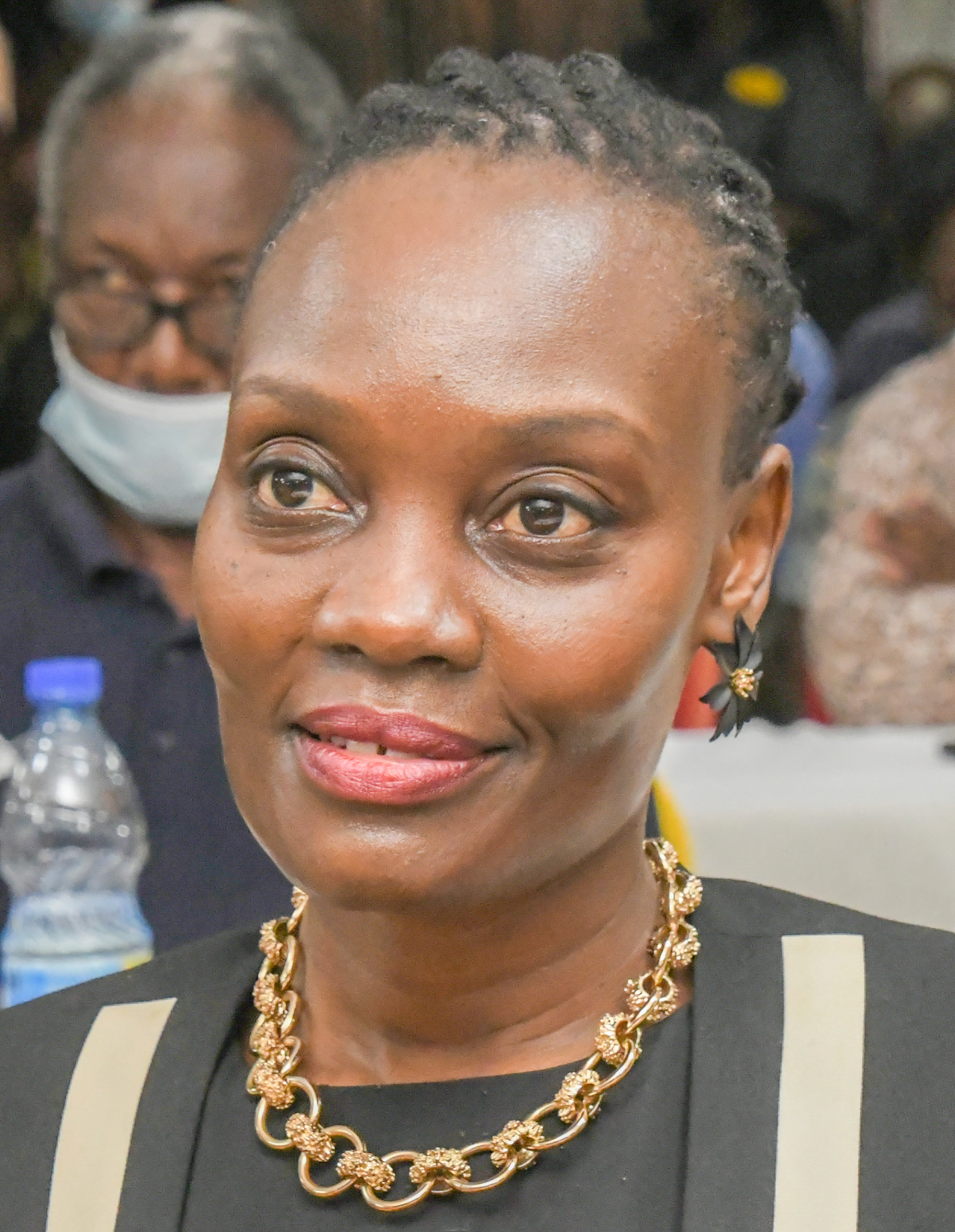
- Jenifer Bamuturaki
- Born: Uganda
- Education: Kyebambe Girls' Secondary School (O-Level); Nabisunsa Girls' Secondary School (A-Level); Makerere University (Bachelor of Arts in Social Work and Social Administration) (Master of Public Administration)
- Occupations: Businesswoman and corporate executive
- Years active: 1990s–present
- Known for: Business, management
- Title: Immediate Former CEO at Uganda Airlines

Jenifer Bamuturaki is a Ugandan businesswoman and corporate executive, who served as the chief executive officer of Uganda Airlines, the national airline of Uganda, from July 2022 until February 2026. Before that, she was the acting CEO at the same airline.

== Background and education ==
Bamuturaki is Ugandan by birth. After completion of her primary education, she was admitted to Kyebambe Girls' Secondary School in Fort Portal, where she completed her O-Level studies. She then transferred to Nabisunsa Girls' Secondary School, where she completed her A-Level education. She entered Makerere University, Uganda's largest public university, where she graduated with a Bachelor of Arts degree in Social Work and Social Administration. She also has qualifications in airlines sales from the International Air Transport Association (IATA), and qualifications in hotel sales and revenue management. As of August 2022, she was pursuing studies leading to a Master of Public Administration degree, from Makerere University. She graduated with that Master's degree in 2024.

== Career ==
As of February 2019, Bamuturaki's career stretched back nearly 30 years. She started out as a guest relations officer at the Kampala Sheraton Hotel. Most of her career has been in marketing, in the hospitality and travel industries. When the defunct Air Uganda was formed in 2007, Bamuturaki joined and worked in the sales and later in the marketing departments.

In 2019, when the government of Uganda revived Uganda Airlines, Bamuturaki was hired as the commercial manager of the new airline. However, after the probationary period ended, she was not given a long-term contract. She left the airline to pursue other business interests c. March 2020.

Following the suspension and interdiction of the entire board of directors and many senior management executives at the airline in April 2021, the shareholders recalled Bamuturaki and made her the acting CEO.

In February 2026, Yoweri Museveni, the president of Uganda, who had appointed her CEO in 2022, terminated her services and appointed Girma Wake as a management consultant and acting CEO responsible for selecting a replacement CEO and a competent management team, in collaboration with the board of directors.

== Other considerations ==
With her appointment as CEO, Bamuturaki became the first substantive CEO at the airline and the first woman in that position. Ephraim Bagenda and Cornwell Muleya were acting CEOs before Bamuturaki was named to head the country's national airline.

In an interview with New Vision, soon after her appointment as substantive CEO, she outlined three areas, where the airline was focusing in the short and medium terms. The first task was to establish self ground-handling at Entebbe International Airport, no later than August 2022. The second task was to increase the destinations for the airline's A330-800 fleet. Destinations under consideration include Kinshasa, Lagos, Accra, Mumbai and Khartoum. The third task was to attempt to reduce operational costs.

== Awards and recognition ==
On 31 October 2022, Bamuturaki was given the 2022 Africa Travel and Tourism 100 Award at a ceremony in Lagos, Nigeria. The award recognizes outstanding women in the African travel and tourism sector. She was chosen over 99 other nominees.

== See also ==
- Transport in Uganda
- List of airlines of Uganda
