= Ethiopian Skylight Hotel =

Hotel in Addis Ababa, Ethiopia

Skylight Hotel
- ስካይላይት ሆቴል
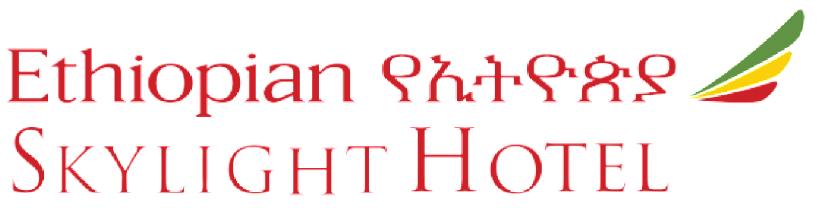

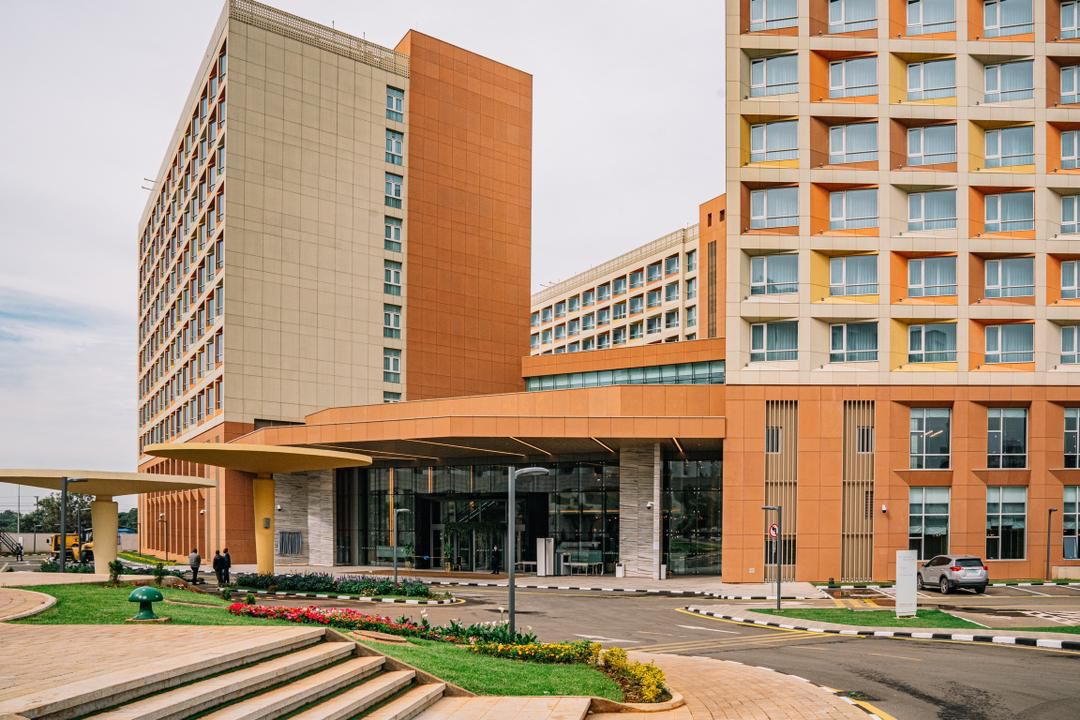
- Interactive map of the Skylight Hotel area

General information
- Location: Airport Road, Bole district, Addis Ababa, Ethiopia
- Coordinates: 8.988416696721453°N 38.790320869314755°E
- Inaugurated: 27 January 2019
- Renovated: 5 May 2023 (expansion)
- Cost: US$36 million
- Renovation cost: US$155 million
- Owner: Ethiopian Airlines

Technical details
- Floor count: 8

Other information
- Seating capacity: 25 million people per year
- Number of rooms: 1,024
- Number of restaurants: 19

Website
- www.ethiopianskylighthotel.com

Skylight Hotel is a five-star hotel in Bole sub-city, Addis Ababa, Ethiopia established in 2019. Inaugurated by Prime Minister Abiy Ahmed and Chairperson of the African Union Moussa Faki, the hotel hosts primarily lodging services for Ethiopian Airlines passengers with 379 rooms accommodating 4,000 guests in a banquet hall.

== Overview ==
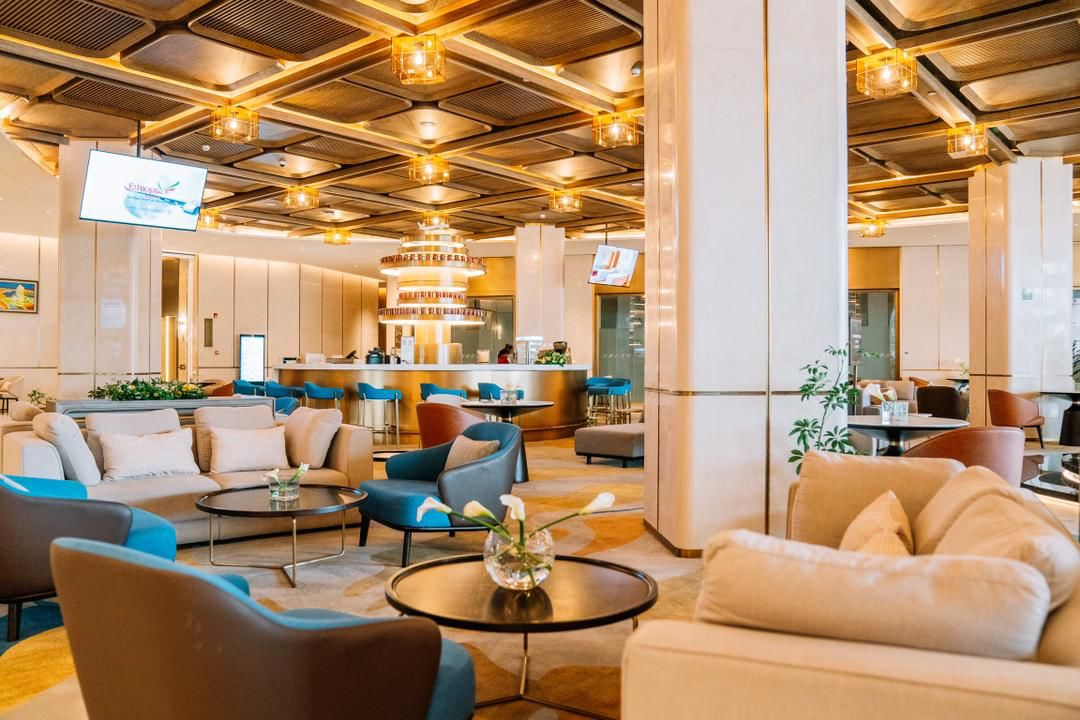
Inside the Skylight Hotel

Skylight Hotel is rated by The Ethiopian Ministry of Culture and Tourism "five star". It was inaugurated on 27 January 2019 by Prime Minister Abiy Ahmed and Chairperson of the African Union Moussa Faki. With 379 rooms, the hotel provides booking service to passengers of the Ethiopian Airlines.

The Skylight Hotel spent $36 million on the project with the goal of serving 25 million people per year. The hotel is situated in Bole Road, Bole district in Addis Ababa In 2023, it opened a 651-room expansion costing $155 million, bringing the room total to 1,024 and making the hotel the largest in Africa. The hotel has 19 food and beverage outlets, including Ethiopian, Italian, Arabian, and Asian restaurants, coffee houses, bars, recreational facilities, and spots for "sips or hand-crafted cocktails" with a panoramic view of the airport and the city.
