= African Airlines Association =

African industry association

- Abbreviation: AFRAA
- Formation: 1 April 1968; 58 years ago
- Legal status: Association
- Purpose: Airline trade association
- Headquarters: Kenya
- Location: Red Cross Road, South B, Nairobi, Kenya
- Coordinates: 01°19′30″S 36°50′20″E
- Region served: Africa
- Members: Airlines
- Official language: English, French
- Secretary General: Abdérahmane Berthé
- Main organ: General Assembly
- Website: www.afraa.org

The African Airlines Association (French: Association des Compagnies Aériennes Africaines), abbreviated AFRAA, is a trade association of African airlines. AFRAA was founded in Accra, Ghana, in 1968, and is, as of February 2021, headquartered in Nairobi, Kenya. The primary purpose of AFRAA is to establish and facilitate co-operation between African airlines.

The formation of the African Airlines Association was the result of historic developments and economic imperatives. In the early 1960s, a great number of African States acceded to independence and created their own national airlines. Most of these airlines became members of the International Air Transport Association.

AFRAA had its conceptual beginning in 1963, when a number of African airlines, taking the opportunity provided by the IATA Annual General Meeting (AGM) began holding consultation meetings prior to the IATA AGMs to discuss matters of interest to African airlines and to adopt common positions. This was the first step towards the creation of AFRAA. From that first step in Rome in 1963, the establishment in 1968 in Accra, of a regional organisation for the articulation of regional views and promotion of co-operation was undertaken by 14 founding members.

== Objectives ==
AFRAA as an association has the following strategic objectives:

- Safe, secure and reliable air transport;

Promote the industry best practices to support safe, secure and reliable air transport in Africa

- Enhance the visibility, reputation and influence of African Airlines in the global aviation industry;
- Sustainable air transport;

Advocate for the reduction of costs of air transport services in Africa by reducing taxes, fees and charges

Strive for the implementation of cost-effective Human Resource Development

Lobby for market access to increase revenues and enhance connectivity for the aviation sector in Africa

- Cooperation;

Undertake the implementation of joint initiatives aimed at reducing operating costs for airlines, increase revenues and market share

Facilitate and encourage partnership among African airlines

- Data intelligence;

Become a hub for data, intelligence and expertise on the African Aviation Industry

== Organs ==
- The General Assembly

The highest policy making body of the Association is the Annual General Assembly composed of Chief Executives of member airlines. The Annual General Assembly is presided over by the President of the Association. The President of the Association rotates annually.

- The Executive Committee

The Executive Committee, composed of 11 members elected on a sub-regional basis among Chief Executives and ex-officio members with voting rights who are members of the IATA Board of Governors, exercises executive authority. Its function is to ensure supervision of the affairs, funds and property of the Association and formulation and determination of policies within the framework of Articles of Association, By-Laws and Resolutions adopted by the General Assembly.

- The Secretariat

The Secretariat serves as the administrative, co-ordination and research centre for the association. It is headed by a secretary general who is responsible for managing the day-to-day activities of the association. The current Secretary General is Mr. Abderahmane Berthe.

== Steering Committees and Projects ==
AFRAA provides a forum through which member airlines meet to develop and consolidate common approach to key issues in the aviation industry.

== AFRAA members ==
Any African airline operating air services in the carriage of passengers and or cargo and meets the eligibility criteria may apply for membership as an Active or Associate member. The following is a list of the current AFRAA members.

Airline (Alliance)	Country	Year Joined AFRAA
AB Aviation	Comoros	2017
AfriJet	Gabon	2022
Afriqiyah Airways	Libya	2002
Air Algérie	Algeria	1968
Air Botswana	Botswana	1991
Air Burkina	Burkina Faso	2002
Air Djibouti	Djibouti	2019.
Air Madagascar	Madagascar	1975
Air Mauritius	Mauritius	1985
Air Namibia	Namibia	2000
Air Peace	Nigeria	2019
Air Senegal	Senegal	2019
Air Tanzania	Tanzania	1977
Air Zimbabwe	Zimbabwe	1981
Allied Air Cargo	Nigeria	2018
ASKY Airlines	Togo	2010
Astral Aviation	Kenya	2011
Badr Airlines	Sudan	2016
Cabo Verde Airlines	Cabo Verde	2014
Camair-Co	Cameroon	2012
CEIBA Intercontinental Airlines	Equatorial Guinea	2011
Congo Airlines	Democratic Republic of Congo	2016
Cronos Airlines	Equatorial Guinea	2015
EgyptAir (SA)	Egypt	1968
Ethiopian Airlines (SA)	Ethiopia	1968
Express AIR Cargo	Tunisia	2016
Ibom Air	Nigeria	2023
Jubba Airways	Somalia	2017
Kenya Airways (ST)	Kenya	1977
LAM Mozambique Airlines	Mozambique	1976
Libyan Airlines	Libya	1968
Mauritania Airlines	Mauritania	2015
Nile Air	Egypt	2016
Nouvelair	Tunisia	2017
Oveland Airways	Nigeria	2019
Precision Air	Tanzania	2006
Royal Air Maroc (OW)	Morocco	1977
RwandAir	Rwanda	2009
Safarilink Aviation	Kenya	2019
Safe Air Company	Kenya	2016
South African Airways (SA)	South Africa	1994
South African Express	South Africa	2003
Sudan Airways	Sudan	1968
TAAG Angola Airlines	Angola	1978
Tassili Airlines	Algeria	2014
Tunisair	Tunisia	1968
Uganda Airlines	Uganda	2019

== AFRAA partners ==
Besides membership contributions to the association, AFRAA has partners, who also support the activities of the association through financial contributions and sponsorship of specific projects and programmes.

The AFRAA Partnership programme is open to all industry-related organisations that are interested in participating in the development of air transport in Africa. The programme aims to pool together resources and support from industry service providers while enabling partners to benefit from a relationship with a continental air transport trade organisation. Interested companies may apply for either full partnership or associate partnership of AFRAA.

== See also ==
- Airlines of Africa
- List of airlines of Africa
- African Civil Aviation Commission (AFCAC)
- Eastern Caribbean Civil Aviation Authority (ECCAA)
- Mohammed Ahmed
