= Mohammed Ahmed (businessman) =

Ethiopian businessman (1932–2024)

- Born: July 1932 (age 93–94); Harar, Ethiopia
- Died: 26 November 2024; Addis Ababa, Ethiopia
- Education: Saint Louis University (Bachelor of Science in Aeronautics); Stanford University (Executive education)
- Occupation: Corporate Executive
- Title: Chief executive officer at Ethiopian Airlines Group

Captain Mohammed Ahmed Bomba (July 1932 – 26 November 2024) was an Ethiopian air travel industry veteran. He was the CEO of Ethiopian Airlines from 1980 to 1991 and later served as the secretary general of the African Airlines Association.

== Background and education ==
Mohammed Ahmed was born to a Harari family in July 1932. In his early career, Mohammed had a brief stint with the Ethiopian Air Force. He held a Bachelor of Science degree in aeronautical engineering, obtained from Saint Louis University and an Executive Program certificate at Stanford University in the United States.

== Career at Ethiopian Airlines ==
Mohammed Ahmed began his career as chief aeronautical engineer at Ethiopian Airlines in the 1960s, playing a foundational role in the airline’s early development. In 1980, he became CEO, known for boldly countering the policies of Ethiopia’s communist Derg regime, thereby preserving the airline’s independence from government influence. Prior to his appointment, Ethiopian Airlines faced operational difficulties that were exacerbated by the Ethiopian Civil War. Mohammed swiftly stabilized the airline, guiding it through challenging times. Quality had declined since the 1970s due to overstaffing and political interference, Mohammed addressed this by reducing the workforce by 10%. During the Cold War, the Ethiopian government proposed replacing American-manufactured planes with Soviet models to align with the USSR, but Ethiopian Airlines, under Mohammed’s leadership, successfully resisted this change. By 1989, the airline had entered a period of prosperity, attributed largely to his leadership.

According to American writer Paul B. Henze, who met Mohammed Ahmed in 1990 at Ethiopian Airlines headquarters in Addis Ababa, he described him as among the top entrepreneurs in the developing world, who also remained loyal to his homeland of Harar. Mohammed would go on to serve as the secretary general of the African Airlines Association in 1992.

== Awards & accolades ==
Mohammed was presented with the African aviation award for his contribution to the advancement of Africa's airlines business in 1999.

== Personal life ==
Mohammed enjoyed long walks and was an avid chess player. According to his former coworker Assefa Ambaye, Mohammed Ahmed was also a supporter of equal rights in the workplace for women. He leaves behind his wife Fethia Ahmed and four children.

== Death ==
Mohammed Ahmed died in Addis Ababa, Ethiopia, on 26 November 2024, and was laid to rest at Kolfe Muslim Cemetery. His funeral was attended by prominent individuals, including Mesfin Bekele, the current CEO of Ethiopian Airlines.
