= Asky Airlines =

Airline in west and central Africa

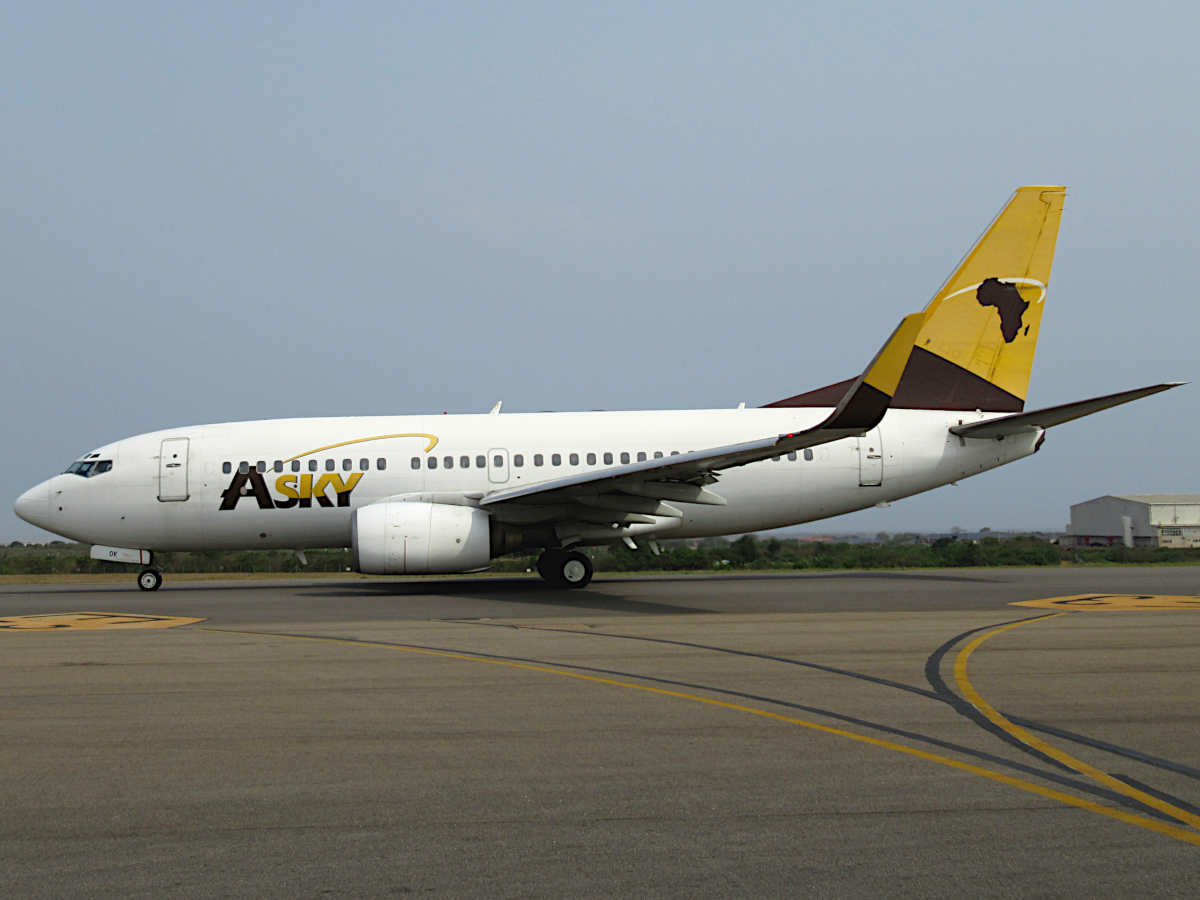
- Asky Airlines Boeing 737-700
IATA	ICAO	Call sign
KP	SKK	ASKY AIRLINE
- Founded: June 2008; 18 years ago
- Commenced operations: 15 January 2010; 16 years ago
- Hubs: Lomé–Tokoin International Airport
- Frequent-flyer program: ASKY Club
- Fleet size: 16
- Destinations: 30
- Headquarters: Lomé, Togo
- Key people: Esayas WoldeMariam (Managing Director), Martial Daté Dovéné Tevi-Bénissan (Commercial Director)
- Employees: 700
- Website: www.flyasky.com

ASKY Airlines is a private multinational passenger airline serving West and Central Africa, with its head office in Lomé, Togo, and its hub at Lomé–Tokoin International Airport.

The airline is a strategic partner of Ethiopian Airlines, and has been consistently profitable since 2017. It has been awarded the title of 'Best Airline in West Africa 2023' at the seventh Accraweizo event held in Accra, Ghana. The airline was recognized for its outstanding contributions to the aviation sector in the region.

== History ==
=== Foundation ===
After the pan-African airline Air Afrique went bankrupt in 2002, cross-border air transport in Africa became more difficult, especially in West and Central Africa. At a conference of the Economic Community of West African States (ECOWAS) and the West African Economic and Monetary Union (UEMOA) at Niamey in Niger on 10 January 2004, it was decided to create a private, competitive, cost-effective airline offering all guarantees of safety and security for the region.

In September 2005, under the initiative of Gervais Koffi G. Djondo, the company for the promotion of a regional airline (SPCAR) was set up, which led to various feasibility studies and market studies, and sought financial and strategic partners; this led to the establishment of ASKY Airlines in November 2007 with Gervais Koffi G. Djondo as President. On 17 January 2008, the General Meeting to establish the new international private airline was held in Ouagadougou, Burkina Faso. 80% of shares were to be held by private investors, and 20% by public financial institutions whose mission is to support privately owned development institutions. Ethiopian Airlines became the technical and strategic partner under a management contract for the first five years of operation, holding a 40% stake.

Originally planned for April 2009, the first revenue flight took place on 15 January 2010.

In 2020 ASKY Airlines was found to be operating the world's shortest international flight route, between Kinshasa and Brazzaville, at 13 miles (21 km).

== Corporate affairs ==
=== Ownership ===
The airline is privately owned. Main shareholders are Ethiopian Airlines (40%), Ecobank, BIDC, BOAD, Sakhumnotho Group Holding, and other West and Central African private investors as well as the Togolese government having a minority stake of 14.39%.

=== Business trends ===
Asky Airlines has been reported as being profitable, although accounts do not seem to have been published. The airline states that it first registered a profit in 2015 and has been consistently profitable since 2017. In the 2021 fiscal year, Asky made a profit of over 12 million dollars, and in 2022, it made a profit of 30 million dollars. The airline has carried over 1.2 million passengers in 2019 alone with 15 aircraft serving 28 destinations across west, central, south and eastern Africa with a plan to expand to north Africa.

Recent available figures (largely from AFRAA reports) are shown below (for years ending 31 December):

	2016	2017	2018	2019
Turnover (XOF billions)				95.0
Net profit / loss (XOF billions)	loss	profit	profit	profit
Number of employees (at year end)	454	458		>500
Number of passengers (000s)	488	488	559	1,200
Passenger load factor (%)	63.2	61.5	61.0	
Number of aircraft (at year-end)	8	7	8	8
Notes/sources				

== Destinations ==
As of 2023, Asky airlines serves 28 destinations in 26 countries within Africa, focusing on developing a strong intra-Africa network that fosters regional development, tourism, economic growth, and regional integration as a major economic catalyst within the continent with its long-term goal of a sustainable business focused on profitability. The Airline served the following 19 scheduled destinations throughout West and Central Africa from its hub at Lome until October 2017.

Hub
Future
Terminated route

City	Country	IATA	ICAO	Airport	Refs
Abidjan	Côte d'Ivoire	ABJ	DIAP	Félix-Houphouët-Boigny International Airport	
Abuja	Nigeria	ABV	DNAA	Nnamdi Azikiwe International Airport	
Accra	Ghana	ACC	DGAA	Accra International Airport	
Bamako	Mali	BKO	GABS	Bamako-Sénou International Airport	
Bangui	Central African Republic	BGF	FEFF	Bangui M'Poko International Airport	
Banjul	Gambia	BJL	GBYD	Banjul International Airport	
Bissau	Guinea-Bissau	OXB	GGOV	Osvaldo Vieira International Airport	
Brazzaville	Republic of the Congo	BZV	FCBB	Maya-Maya Airport	
Conakry	Guinea	CKY	GUCY	Conakry International Airport	
Cotonou	Benin	COO	DBBB	Cadjehoun Airport	
Dakar	Senegal	DSS	GOBD	Blaise Diagne International Airport	
Douala	Cameroon	DLA	FKKD	Douala International Airport	
Freetown	Sierra Leone	FNA	GFLL	Lungi International Airport	
Johannesburg	South Africa	JNB	FAOR	O. R. Tambo International Airport	
Kinshasa	Democratic Republic of Congo	FIH	FZAA	N'djili Airport	
Lagos	Nigeria	LOS	DNMM	Murtala Mohammed International Airport	
Libreville	Gabon	LBV	FOOL	Léon-Mba International Airport	
Lomé	Togo	LFW	DXXX	Gnassingbé Eyadéma International Airport	
Luanda	Angola	NBJ	FNBJ	Dr. António Agostinho Neto International Airport	
Luanda	Angola	LAD	FNLU	Quatro de Fevereiro Airport	
Malabo	Equatorial Guinea	SSG	FGSL	Malabo International Airport	
Monrovia	Liberia	ROB	GLRB	Roberts International Airport	
Monrovia	Liberia	MLW	GLMR	Spriggs Payne Airport	
N'Djamena	Chad	NDJ	FTTJ	N'Djamena International Airport	
Nairobi	Kenya	NBO	HKJK	Jomo Kenyatta International Airport	
Niamey	Niger	NIM	DRRN	Diori Hamani International Airport	
Nouakchott	Mauritania	NKC	GQNO	Nouakchott-Oumtounsy International Airport	
Ouagadougou	Burkina Faso	OUA	DFFD	Thomas Sankara International Airport	
Pointe Noire	Republic of the Congo	PNR	FCPP	Agostinho-Neto International Airport	
Praia	Cape Verde	RAI	GVNP	Nelson Mandela International Airport	
São Tomé	São Tomé e Príncipe	TMS	FPST	São Tomé International Airport	
Yaoundé	Cameroon	NSI	FKYS	Yaoundé Nsimalen International Airport	

=== Alliances and codeshare agreements ===
In 2021, ASKY became a member of IATA.

Asky Airlines have Codeshare agreements with the following airlines:

- Air Senegal
- Ethiopian Airlines

== Fleet ==
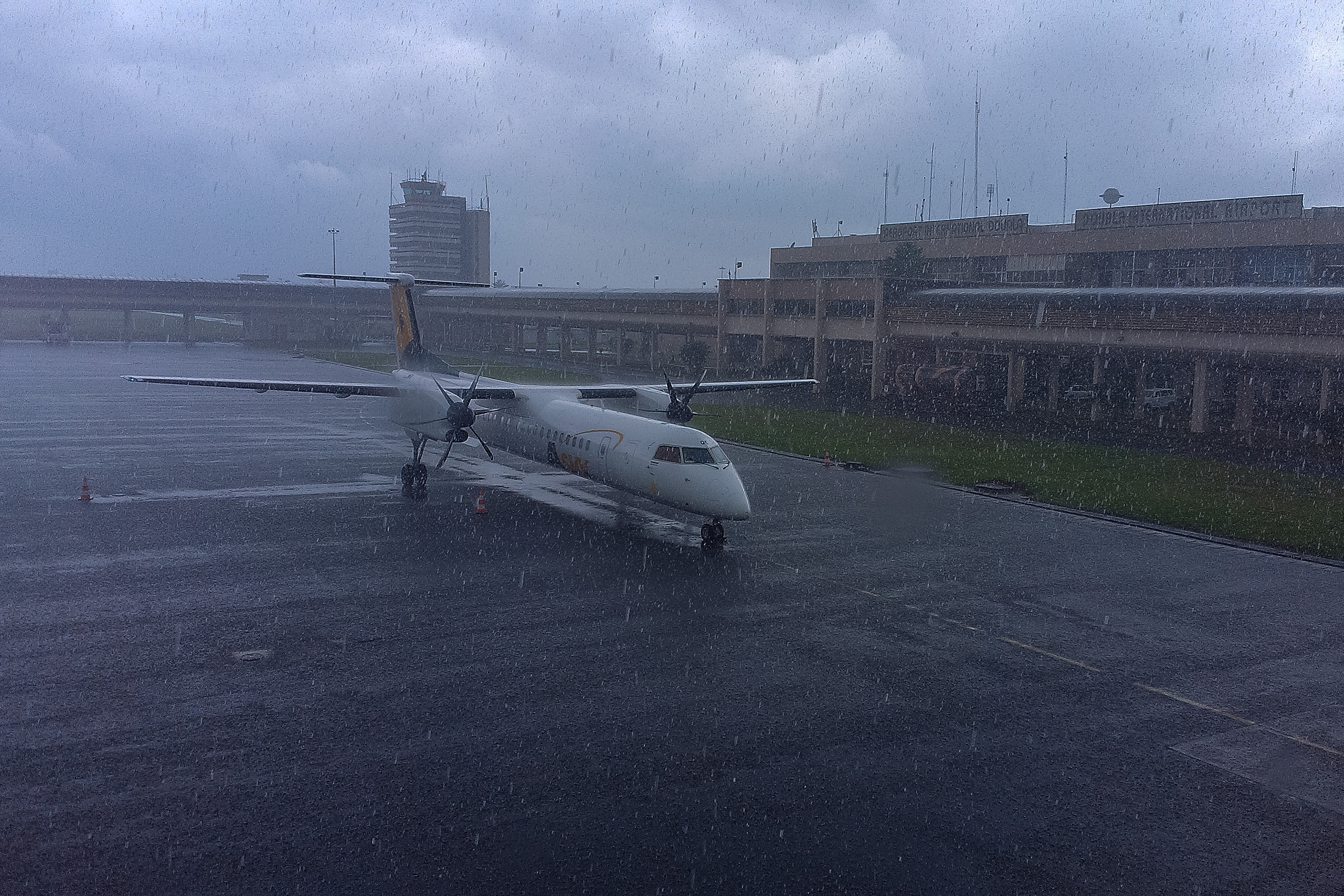
ASKY Airlines Q400 at Douala, Cameroon (2013)

As of August 2025, Asky Airlines operates the following aircraft:

Asky Airlines fleet
Aircraft	In service	Orders	Passengers			Notes
Aircraft	In service	Orders	C	Y	Total	Notes
Boeing 737-700	2	—	16	99	115	
Boeing 737-800	9	—	16	138	154	
Boeing 737 MAX 8	5	—	16	144	160	
Total	16	—				

== Accidents and incidents ==
- On 10 January 2015 an Asky Airlines Boeing 737-43QSF (leased from Ethiopian Airlines), was damaged beyond repair in a landing accident and runway excursion at Accra International Airport, Accra, Ghana. The aircraft was written off but there were no fatalities.
