= List of companies of Gabon =

Location of Gabon

Gabon, officially the Gabonese Republic, is a sovereign state on the west coast of Central Africa located on the equator. Gabon's economy is dominated by oil. Oil revenues comprise roughly 46% of the government's budget and 74% of exports. The gross domestic product (GDP) of oil accounted for 51% of the economy in 2022, up from 38.5% in 2021. Oil production is now declining rapidly from its high point of 370,000 barrels per day in 1997 to 195,000 in 2022. The economy is highly dependent on extraction of abundant primary materials. Prior to the discovery of oil, logging was the pillar of the Gabonese economy. Today, logging and manganese mining are the other major income generators. Former President Ali Bongo aimed to reduce the country's dependency on oil to as low as 20% by 2025. The transitional government stated that it hopes to reduce the dependence on oil production while diversifying the Gabonese economy.

== Notable firms ==
This list includes notable companies with primary headquarters located in the country. The industry and sector follow the Industry Classification Benchmark taxonomy. Organizations which have ceased operations are included and noted as defunct.

Notable companies Status: P=Private, S=State; A=Active, D=Defunct
Name	Industry	Sector	Headquarters	Founded	Notes	Status	
Afric Aviation	Consumer services	Airlines	Port-Gentil	2011	Regional airline	P	A
Air Excellence	Consumer services	Airlines	Libreville	2002	Defunct 2004	P	D
Air Gabon	Consumer services	Airlines	Libreville	1951	Defunct 2006	P	D
Air Inter Gabon	Consumer services	Airlines	Port-Gentil	1956	Defunct 2006	P	D
Air Max Africa	Consumer services	Airlines	Libreville	2002	Defunct 2006	P	D
Air Service Gabon	Consumer services	Airlines	Libreville	1965	Defunct 2010	P	D
BGFIBank Group	Financials	Banks	Libreville	1971	Financial services	P	A
Gabon Airlines	Consumer services	Airlines	Libreville	2007	Defunct 2012	P	D
Gabon Express	Consumer services	Airlines	Libreville	1998	Defunct 2004	P	D
Gabon Poste	Industrials	Delivery services	Libreville	2001	Postal service	S	A
Gabon Telecom	Telecommunications	Mobile telecommunications	Libreville	2001	Part of Maroc Telecom (Morocco)	P	A
Jet Express	Consumer services	Airlines	Libreville	1989	Regional airline	P	A
National Airways Gabon	Consumer services	Airlines	Libreville	2002	Defunct 2009	P	D
Nationale Regionale Transport	Consumer services	Airlines	Libreville	2002	Domestic airline	P	A
Nouvelle Air Affaires Gabon	Consumer services	Airlines	Libreville	1975	Charter airline	P	A
RegionAir	Consumer services	Airlines	Port-Gentil	2007	Regional airline	P	A
Sky Gabon	Industrials	Delivery services	Libreville	2006	Cargo airline	P	A
Société Nationale Petrolière Gabonaise	Oil & gas	Exploration & production	Libreville	1987	Oil & gas	S	A

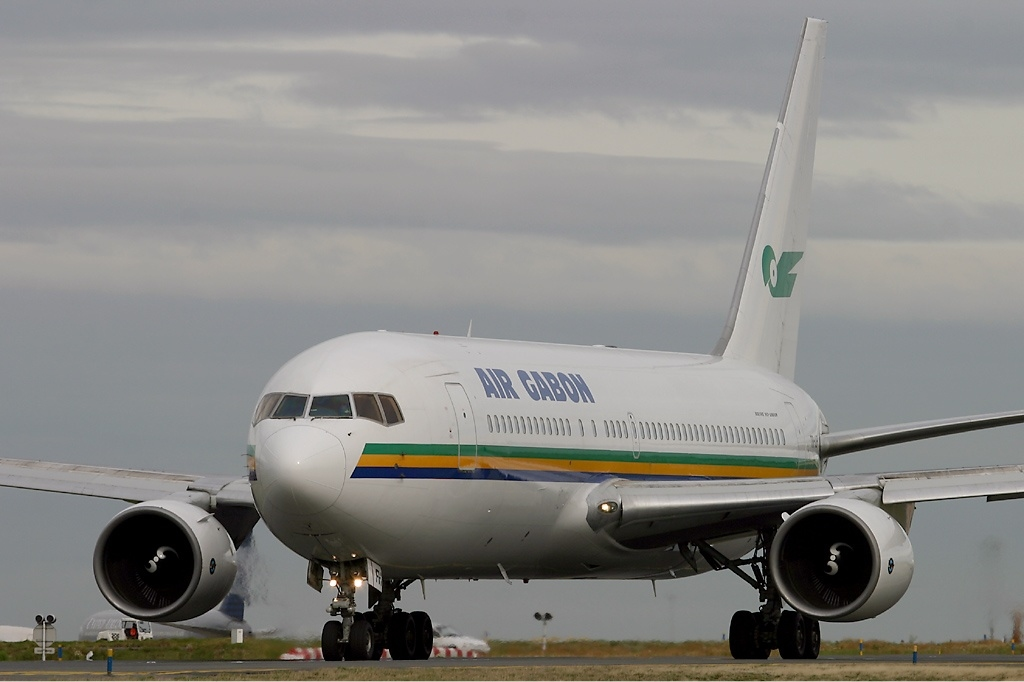
An Air Gabon Boeing 767-200 at Charles de Gaulle Airport in 2004.

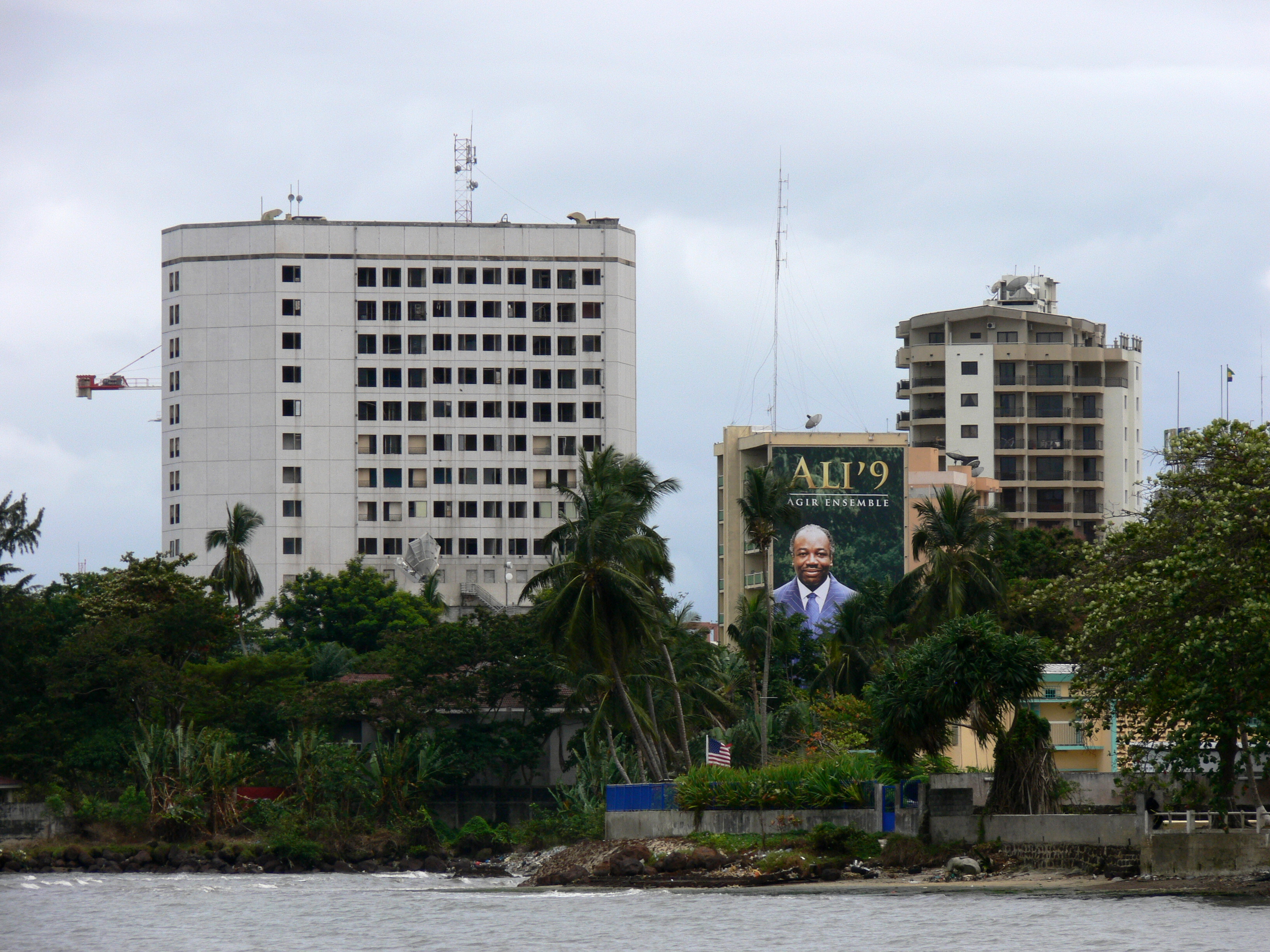
Libreville is the capital and financial center of Gabon.

== See also ==
- List of airlines of Gabon
- List of banks in Gabon
- Economy of Gabon
