= List of defunct airlines of Gabon =

This is a list of defunct airlines of Gabon.

Airline	Image	IATA	ICAO	Callsign	Commenced operations	Ceased operations	Notes
Affretair		DG			1975	1983	Formed by Air Trans Africa to surround the Rhodesian sanctions. Taken over by Air Zimbabwe. Operated Douglas DC-7, Douglas DC-8
Air Affaires Gabon					1975	1996	Merged with Gabon Air Transport to form Nouvelle Air Affaires Gabon
Air Continental Africa			ACB	AIRCONTI	2000	2003	
Air Excellence					2002	2004	Operated Beech Baron,
Air Gabon		GN	AGN	AIR GABON	1974	2006	
Air Gabon Cargo		PG			1978	1979	Operated Douglas DC-8, Canadair CL-44D4-2
Air Inter Gabon		GB	AIG		1956	2001	
Air Max Africa			AZX	AZIMA	2005	2006	
Air Max-Gabon					2002	2005	Rebranded as Air Max Africa
Air Ogooue					2001	2001	Operated Vickers Viscount 800
Air Service Gabon		X7	AGB		1965	2010	
Air Tourist Gabon			ATG		2001	2011	Renamed to Allegiance Airways Gabon. Operated BAe 146-200
Allegiance Airways Gabon			ATG		2011	2015	Established as Air Tourist Gabon. Operated BAe 146-200, Boeing 737-200, Saab 340
Avirex		V2	GXG	AVIREX	1994	2007	Renamed to Jet Express Gabon. Operated ATR 42, Beech 1900, Douglas DC-9, Fokker F28
Compagnie Aérienne Brouillet					1956	1968	Founded by Jean-Claude Brouillet. Renamed to Société Nationale Transgabon
Compagnie Aérienne Gabonaise		GN			1951	1968	Renamed to Société Nationale Transgabon. Operated DHC-5 Buffalo, Douglas DC-4, Douglas DC-6, Fokker F28, Sud Aviation Caravelle
DAV-Aero					1999	2002	Established as Gabon Air Brousee in 1998. Operated Piper Cherokee, Piper Navajo
Gabon Air Transport					1995	1996	Founded by Pierre Vialaret. Merged with Air Affaires Gabon to form Nouvelle Air Affaires Gabon. Operated Beech 2000
Gabon Airlines		GY	GBK	GABON AIRLINES	2006	2012	
Gabon Airlines					2015	2018	Resumed operations. Operated ATR 72-500, Boeing 737-300
Gabon Airlines Cargo		6G	GBC		2006	2008	
Gabon Express			GBE	GABEX	1998	2004	
Jet Express		G2	VXG		2007	2017	Established as Avirex
La Nationale					2018	2018	Rebranded from Nationale Regionale Transport
MR Lines		XV			2006	2007	Operated Fokker F28
National Airways Gabon					2004	2009	Renamed to Nationale Regionale Transport
Nationale Regionale Transport			NRG		2009	2018	Renamed to La Nationale. Operated Embraer Brasilia, Saab 340
Ogooue Air Cargo			GBO		1988	1989	
Peschaud Air Services					2000	2003	AOC revoked
SCD Aviation			SCY		2004	2015	Operated Dornier 228, Embraer Brasilia
Sky Gabon		GV	SKG	SKY GABON	2006	2019	
Société Anonyme de Construction					1975	1980	Operated Carvair
Société Anonyme de Fret et de Transport (SAFT Gabon)					1996	1999	Operated Short 330, Vickers Viscount
Société Nationale Transgabon					1968	1977	Renamed Air Gabon
Transair Gabon			TGX	TRANSGABON	2000	2001	

== See also ==
- List of airlines of Gabon
- List of airports in Gabon
