= Chronology of Gabon =

The African nation of Gabon has had human inhabitants for perhaps 400,000 years. Bantu peoples settled here from the 11th century. The coastline first became known to Europeans through Portuguese and Dutch sailors. Colonised by the French in the 19th century, Gabon became independent in 1960.

== Prehistory, protohistory ==
-400 000 years: shaped stones found near Otoumbi in the middle of the country, attest to inhabitation beginning in this period.

-12 000 years: axes and arrow heads dating to this period are found in Moyen-Ogooué province and in the southern part of the country.

-8 000 years: rock drawings dating to this period found near Cap Lopez.

-5 000: The first pygmies people the territory of the current Gabon.

Iron Age: iron metallurgy in Gabon, attested to by traces found in several sites.

11th century: Bantu migrations, coming from the north. Little by little the Bantu begin to outnumber the pygmies.

== Before colonization ==
1472: Portuguese sailors are the first Europeans to enter the Komo estuary.

1480: the Portuguese navigator Fernan Vaz explores the lagoon which today is named for him in the south of the Ogooué delta.

1600: the Dutch build a small fort on the island of Corisco, destroyed shortly thereafter by the Mpongwè.

1609: shipwreck of the Mauritius, a ship of the Dutch East India Company, off Cape Lopez.

1698: Dutch sailors destroy several Mpongwé villages in the Gabon estuary.

1722: the pirate captain Bartholomew Roberts is killed by the English navy off Cape Lopez.

== Colonial period ==
1839: the Mpongwe chief Denis Rapontchombo authorizes the French to settle on the left bank of the Komo estuary.

1841: the "king" Louis Dowe in turn authorises the French to settle the right bank of the estuary.

1843: construction of Fort-d'Aumale, first permanent French settlement on the Komo estuary.

1849: Louis-Édouard Bouët-Willaumetz founds Libreville and settles slaves freed from a slave transport there.

1862: treaty establishing French sovereignty over Cap Lopez.

1873: Alfred Marche and the marquis Victor de Compiègne try to follow the course of the Ogooué upstream.

1875–1878: first expedition of Pierre Savorgnan de Brazza in the Ogooué basin.

1886: Gabon becomes a French colony.

1889: the Woermann company exports the first okoumé to Hamburg.

1896: Awandji took the Lastourville outpost and kill the French administrator.

1898: The concessionary companies are allocated vast territories which they put in regulated sections.

1899: André Raponda-Walker is the first Gabonese ordained as a priest.

1899: concession system spreads across all of Gabon. Almost the entire country allocated to French logging companies

1900: determination of the border between Gabon and Spanish Guinea.

1900: death in captivity, in Gabon, of Samory Touré.

1903–1908: Mitsogo revolt against French implantation in Ngounié.

1908: pacification of Haut-Ivindo by capitain Fabiani. who founds the Makokou outpost.

1911: France cedes Woleu-Ntem to Germany, which attaches it to Cameroon.

1911: surrender of the Bakaya chief, Maruvulu, after several years of guerilla warfare.

1913: Albert Schweitzer founds a hospital in Lambaréné.

1913: the Mitsogo chief Mbombé dies in prison at Mouila.

1914–1915: fighting in Woleu-Ntem between Senegalese sharpshooters and German troops from the Cameroon. Collapse of okoumé market, which had primarily been exported to Germany. Gabonese forced to harvest rubber or palm kernels to pay head tax, men also forcibly recruited to serve as porters in military campaigns.

1922: the administrator Montespan signs a peace treaty with Chief Wongo, halting the guerilla actions of the Awandji.

1925: Haut-Ogooué is attached to Moyen-Congo.

1929: the surrender of chief Wongo ends the uprising of the Awandji of l'Ogooué-Lolo.

1933: Léon Mba is exiled in Oubangui-Chari.

1940: the colony of Gabon rallies to the Free French (France libre) after several battles between Vichyste and Gaullistes.

1946: Jean-Hilaire Aubame, founder of the Union Démocratique et Sociale du Gabon, is the first Gabonese elected to the French National Assembly.

1946: Haut-Ogooué is definitively attached to Gabon.

1946: Abolition of forced labor

1956: Léon Mba is elected mayor of Libreville.

1956: first oil wells, at Ozouri, by the la Société des Pétroles d'Afrique Équatoriale, the future Elf-Gabon.

1958: Gabon becomes an autonomous state within the framework of the Communauté française.

== Since independence ==
1960: the Republic of Gabon becomes an independent state.

1961: Léon Mba is elected president of the Republic.

1962: COMILOG (Compagnie Minière de l'Ogooué) begins mining manganese.

1964: attempted military coup d'état against Léon Mba fails due to French military intervention.

1967: death of Léon Mba. Albert-Bernard Bongo succeeds him as president of the Republic.

1968: president Bongo installs a single-party régime.

1970: the first buildings open at the university of Libreville.

1971: assassination in Libreville of opposition politician Germain Mba by two mercenaries.

1973: Albert-Bernard Bongo converts to Islam and becomes Omar Bongo.

1975: Gabon becomes a member of OPEC.

1976: construction of the omnisport stadium in Libreville, which hosts the first Central African Games.

1977: assassination of the Gabonese poet Ndouna Depenaud.

1977: Omar Bongo initiates a series of infrastructure projects in Libreville.

1977: creation of the state-owned compagny Air Gabon.

1977: summit meeting of the Organisation of African Unity (OAU) in Libreville.

1978: the Gabonese government expels thousands of nationals of Benin.

1981: founding of MORENA (MOuvement de REdressement NAtional), unsanctioned opposition party.

1981: Gabon expels several thousand nationals of Cameroon.

1981: Omar Bongo is received by Ronald Reagan in Washington.

1982: official visit of pope Pope John Paul II to Gabon.

1983: official visit of François Mitterrand, president of the French republic.

1983: creation in Libreville of the CICIBA (Centre International des CIvilisations BAntoues, International Center of Bantu Civilizations).

1985: capital execution of captain Alexandre Mandja Ngokouta in Libreville.

1986: inauguration of the Libreville-Franceville railway line (le Transgabonais).

1990: after a period of political unrest, re-establishment of multipartisme.

1990: French military intervention at Port-Gentil and at Libreville to evacuate foreign nationals (opération Requin).

1993: presidential election; Omar Bongo wins beating father Paul Mba Abessole.

1994: devaluation of the CFA franc triggers a price increase for imported goods and a drop in the buying power of the Gabonese. Also logging increases and concessions greatly expanded.

1994: Gabon leaves OPEC.

1995: Gabonese police expel thousands of undocumented foreigners ("sans-papiers").

1996: le père Paul Mba Abessole est élu maire de Libreville.

1996: an epidemic of Ebola kills several dozen people in Ogooué-Ivindo (Mayibout village).

1997: Omar Bongo supports the return to power of Denis Sassou-Nguesso in Congo-Brazzaville.

1998: re-election of Omar Bongo to the presidency.

2001: Omar Bongo, Denis Sassou-Nguesso et Idriss Déby lose the lawsuit they initiated in French courts against the writer François-Xavier Verschave for "offense to a foreign head of state".

2002: Paul Mba Abessole becomes minister of human rights of president Bongo.

2005: unsurprising reelection of Omar Bongo Ondimba to the presidency.

2006: liquidation of the state compagny Air Gabon, which had been struggling for years with financial difficulties.

2007: creation of the private company Gabon Airlines.

2009: death of Omar Bongo 7 June.

2009: election of Ali Bongo Ondimba, minister of defense et son of Omar Bongo Ondimba (30 August).

2013: liquidation of Gabon Airlines.

== See also ==
- Timeline of Libreville

== Bibliography ==
- Institut für Afrika-Kunde; Rolf Hofmeier, eds. (1990). "Gabun". Afrika Jahrbuch 1989 (in German). Germany: Leske + Budrich. doi:10.1007/978-3-322-92639-5. ISBN 978-3-8100-0831-2. OCLC 19093344. "Politik, Wirtschaft und Gesellschaft in Afrika südlich der Sahara"
- "Gabon". Political Chronology of Africa. Political Chronologies of the World. Europa Publications. 2001. p. 181+. ISBN 978-0203409954.
- Douglas A. Yates (2013). "Gabon". In Andreas Mehler; et al. (eds.). Africa Yearbook: Politics, Economy and Society South of the Sahara in 2012. Vol. 9. Koninklijke Brill. p. 261+. ISBN 9789004256002. ISSN 1871-2525.
