= GBK =

GBK may refer to:

== Sport ==
- GBK Kokkola, a Finnish football club
- Gelora Bung Karno Stadium, an Indonesian sport stadium
- Gentofte BK, a Danish badminton club
- Gråå BK, a Swedish volleyball club

== Other uses ==
- GBK (character encoding)
- Gabon Airlines
- Gbangbatok Airport, in Sierra Leone
- Gourmet Burger Kitchen, a British restaurant chain
- Grand Belial's Key, an American National Socialist black metal band
- Gulf Bank of Kuwait
- Mandeali language
