= SVG (disambiguation) =

SVG or Scalable Vector Graphics is a vector image format for two-dimensional computer graphics.

SVG may also refer to:

== Places ==
- Saint Vincent and the Grenadines, a Caribbean nation
  - Area code 784, also called the SVG area code, in St. Vincent and the Grenadines
- Stevenage railway station (station code SVG), Stevenage, Hertfordshire, England, UK
- Stavanger Airport, Sola (IATA airport code SVG), Rogaland, Norway; a public airport frequently called "Sola"
  - Sola Air Station (IATA airport code SVG), Sola, Rogaland, Norway; a Norwegian Air Force station
- Skorradalshreppur, Iceland (ISO 3166 Iceland (IS) location code SVG); see ISO 3166-2:IS

== People ==
- Shane van Gisbergen (born 1989), a New Zealand racing driver
- Stan Van Gundy (born 1959), American basketball coach and analyst
- DZ SVG (born 1988), Filipino musician
- Miss St. Vincent and the Grenadines (Miss SVG), a beauty pageant queen title

== Businesses, companies, organizations ==
- SVG Working Group, for developing Scalable Vector Graphics
- Solenta Aviation Gabon (ICAO airline code SVG); see List of airlines of Gabon
- SVG Air of Saint Vincent and the Grenadines, ICAO airline code
- SVG-TV, television station of Saint Vincent and the Grenadines
- The SVG Party, a political party in Saint Vincent and the Grenadines
- SVG Capital, a financial sector company in the UK
- SVG, a videogaming news website owned by Static Media
- Silicon Valley Group, a subsidiary of ASML Holding
- Sun Valley Gardens, former nudist club in Pelham, Ontario, Canada
- Serb Volunteer Guard, a former Serbian paramilitary

== Other uses ==
- Saint Vincent and the Grenadines Coast Guard ship prefix
