= List of airlines of Gabon =

This is a list of airlines currently operating in Gabon:

Airline	Image	IATA	ICAO	Callsign	Hub airport(s)	Notes
Afrijet Business Service		J7	ABS	AFRIJET	Libreville International Airport	
Fly Gabon						
Nationale Regionale Transport			NRG		Léon-Mba International Airport	
Nouvelle Air Affaires Gabon		NB	NVS	NOUVELLE AFFAIRES	Libreville International Airport	
RegionAir		RCG	RSG	REGIONAL	Port-Gentil International Airport	
Solenta Aviation Gabon			SVG	SOLENTA	Léon-Mba International Airport	

== See also ==
- List of defunct airlines of Gabon
- List of airports in Gabon
- List of airlines
- List of air carriers banned in the European Union
- List of companies based in Gabon
