= Jean-Jacques Lumumba =

Congolese banker and whistleblower (born 1986)

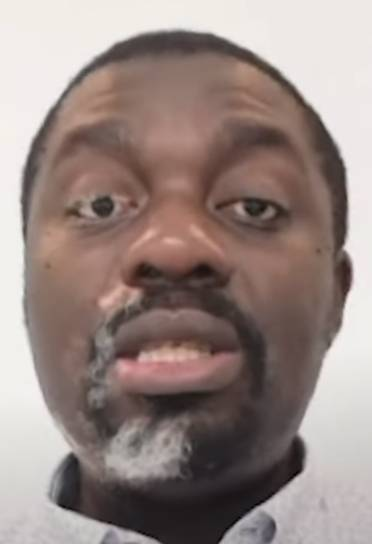
Lumumba in 2022

Jean-Jacques Lumumba (born February 19,1986) is a Congolese banker and whistleblower. In 2016, he revealed that the BGFIBank Group had covered up the embezzlement of tens of millions of dollars' worth of public money by DRC president Joseph Kabila and his entourage.

== Biography ==
Lumumba was born in February 19,1986, maternally related to former DRC Prime Minister Patrice Lumumba and paternally related to Kimbanguism founder Simon Kimbangu. Growing up in Kinshasa, he and his family suffered harassment from both the Mobutu Sese Seko and Laurent-Désiré Kabila regimes because of their relation to Patrice Lumumba. He then studied at Boboto College before earning a bachelor's degree in economics in Kinshasa and then an MBA in France.

In 2012, he began working for the BGFIBank Group in the DRC. In 2016, he was promoted to director of engagements in the group, which brought him into close contact with many of the leading figures of the Joseph Kabila government. After noticing suspicious transactions on several client accounts, including Gécamines and companies owned by Kabila's entourage, he alerted PricewaterhouseCoopers, the Group's auditor. He also attempted to block an illegal loan to the Independent National Electoral Commission, but was overruled by his superiors. He then faced harassment and pressure from the BFGIBank Group hierarchy, including being threatened with firearms, eventually being forced to go on sick leave.

While on sick leave in Europe, he decided to resign. He then contacted Belgian newspaper Le Soir with documents he had managed to retrieve proving the embezzlement, leading the paper to publish an investigative series titled "La corruption du régime Kabila vue de l’intérieur" and which were soon dubbed by Congolese civil society groups the "Lumumba papers."

In 2019, while living as a refugee in France, he sued BGFIBank over the harassment he had suffered with the support of the Platform to Protect Whistleblowers in Africa (PPLAAF). That year, he was awarded an international anti-corruption prize by the United Nations.

In July 2021, his car was burned and his bag containing his laptops was stolen while traveling to Brussels for the Dynamic Congo 2060 conference, in what was potentially ongoing targeted intimidation for his whistleblowing.
