= Tournament of the nine provinces of Gabon =

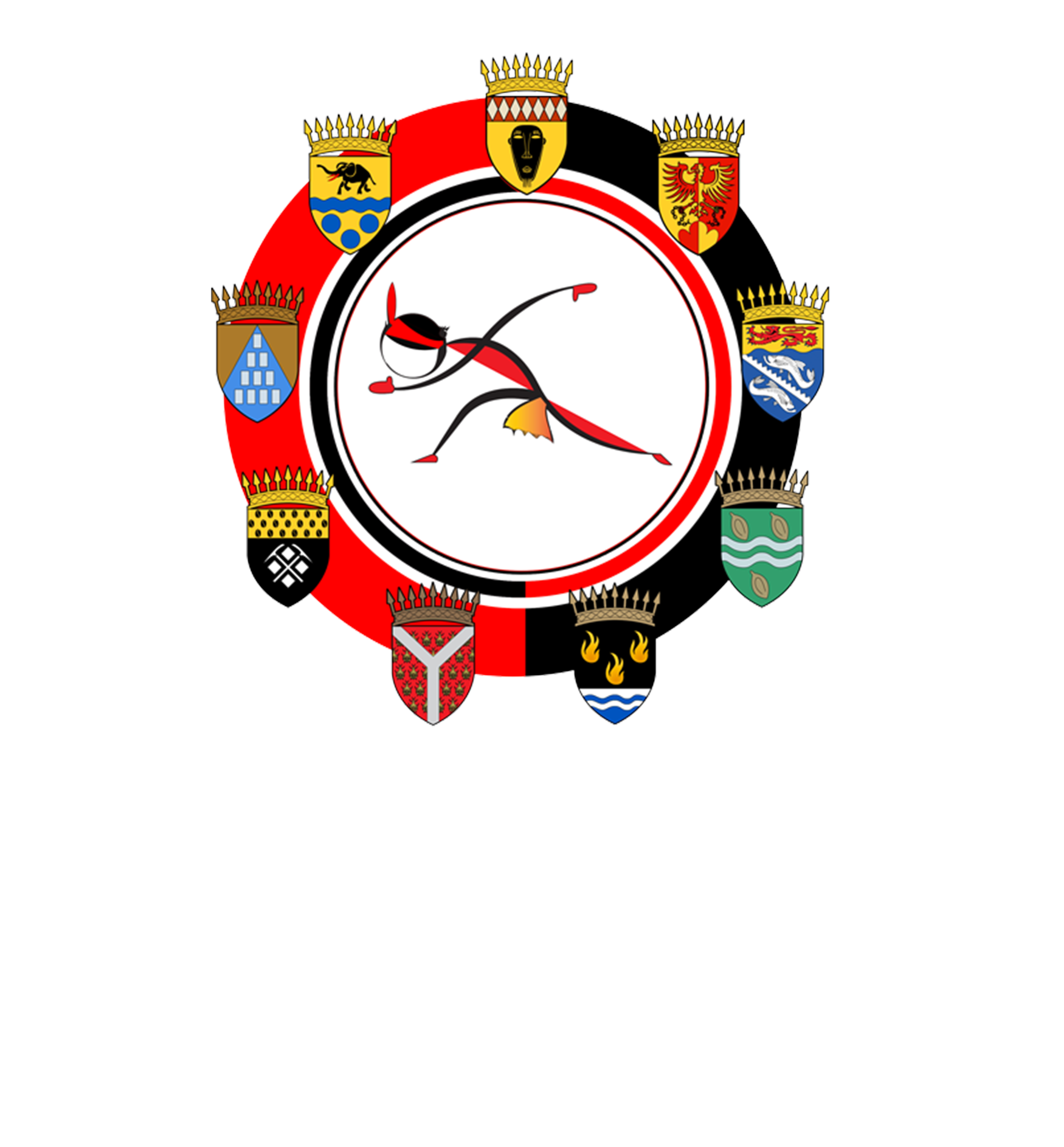
Logo of tournament of the 9 provinces

The tournament of the 9 provinces of Gabon (T9P) is a festival of traditional African dances and songs that takes place during the month of August in Libreville in Gabon. Although the event takes place in Gabon, the initial objective of this event is to present the traditional cultural richness of the different ethnic groups of the peoples of Central Africa.

== Historical ==
The origin of the creation of the tournament of the nine provinces dates back to 2015. This independent initiative was born thanks to Yoan Mboussou, Doctor and president of the socio-cultural association Espoir Gabon, who had this idea after discovering the "abandoned remains" of the Bantu International Center of Civilizations (CICIBA), a project that never really came into being when it was supposed to promote Bantu culture around the world. There was also, according to the members of the association Gabon, a desire to revive the festival of cultures Gabon which had disappeared in recent years.

The first edition of this festival took place in August 2016 in Libreville, one week before the Gabonese presidential election of 2016 which was going to plunge the country into a deep political crisis. There was a desire to strengthen social cohesion, which was beginning to show signs of tension in the face of the presidential scrutiny approach.

== Edition ==
=== 2016 ===
The 2016 tournament of the nine provinces took place during the week of 13 to 20 August 2016, in Libreville, Gabon. Open to the public, its realization within the ruins of the CICIBA was done with the cooperation of the squatters association of CICIBA. The final of this first edition saw the participation of two countries: Gabon and Chad. The President of the jury was none other than the singer of the traditional group Tandima, Vyckos Ekondo. The socio-cultural group Mouvissa won the first prize, amounting to 1 000 000 FCFA. The final groups for this edition were the Akeng Alliance, Bane Batsiane, Cultural Hope, Milimba, Mivengui, Mouvissa, Mutoka culture, Ogheya and Lip Darna groups from Chad (excluding competition).

=== 2017 ===
The 2017 edition took place from 7 to 16 August 2017 at the Botanical Garden of Libreville.
