= Economy of Gabon =

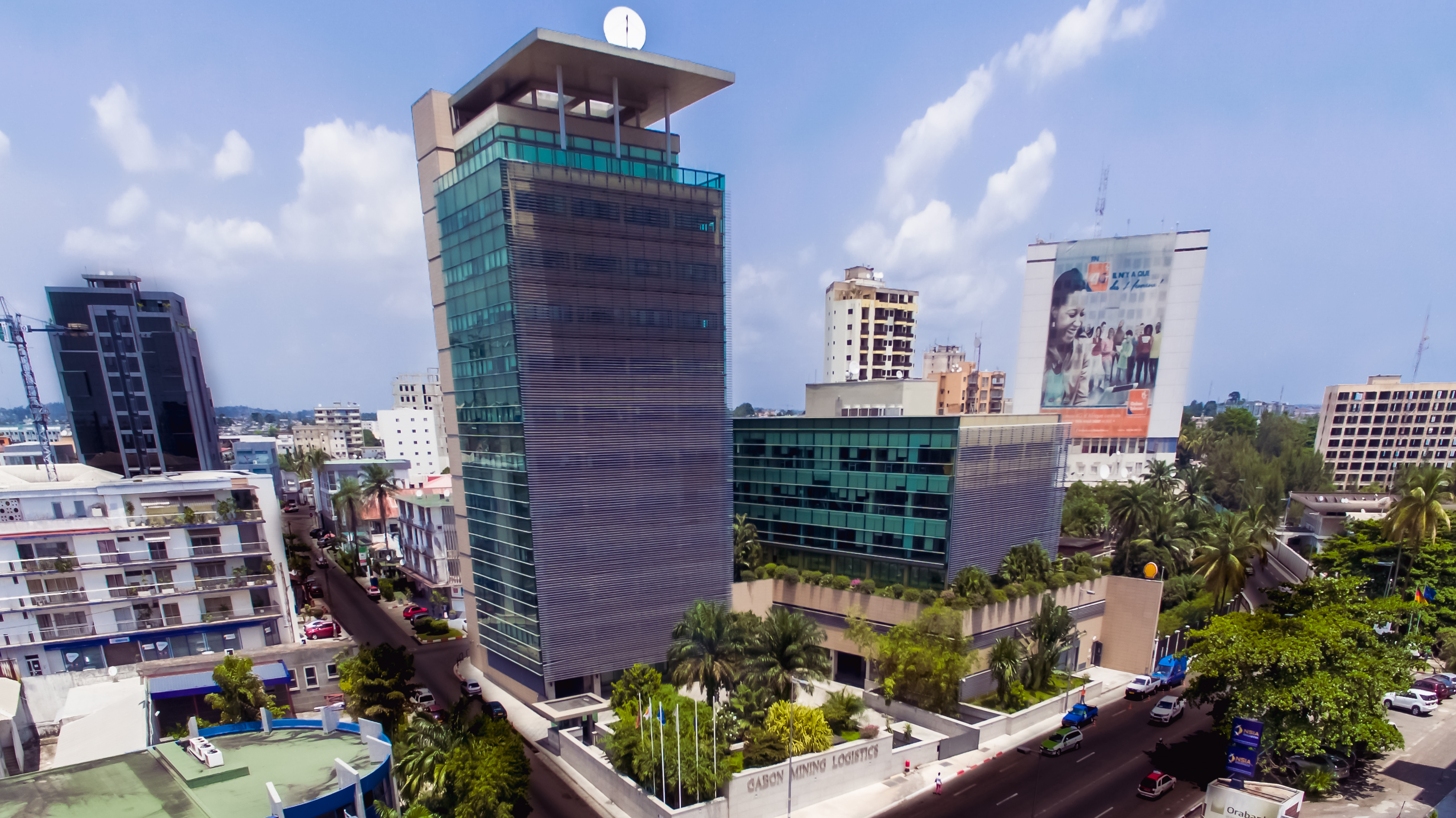
- Libreville is the capital and financial center of Gabon
- Currency: 1 Central African CFA franc (XAF) = 100 centimes
- Fiscal year: calendar year
- Trade organisations: AU, AfCFTA, WTO
- Country group: Developing/Emerging; Upper-middle income economy

Statistics
- Population: ▲2,484,789 (2023)
- GDP: ▼$20.39 billion (nominal; 2025); ▲$57.45 billion (PPP; 2025)
- GDP rank: 126th (nominal; 2025); 130th (PPP; 2025)
- GDP growth: ▲2.8% (2025); ▲2.6% (2026f)
- GDP per capita: ▼$10,840 (nominal; 2025); ▲$24,910 (PPP; 2025)
- GDP per capita rank: 85th (nominal; 2025); 79th (PPP; 2025)
- GDP per capita growth: 1.2% (2024)
- GDP by sector: agriculture: 4.5%; industry: 62.7%; services: 32.8% (2010 est.)
- Inflation (CPI): 2.1% (2024)
- Population below national poverty line: ▲33.4% (2017); ▼32.2% on less than $5.50/day (2017)
- Labour force: 771,230 (2023 est.)
- Labour force by occupation: agriculture: 60%; industry: 15%; services: 25% (2000 est.)
- Unemployment: 20.36% (2023 est.)
- Main industries: petroleum extraction and refining; manganese, gold; chemicals, ship repair, food and beverages, textiles, lumbering and plywood, cement

External
- Exports: $12.935 billion (2022 est.)
- Export goods: crude oil 70%, timber, manganese
- Main export partners: China 43%; South Korea 8%; Italy 7%; India 7%; Indonesia 5%; (2022 est.)
- Imports: $3.499 billion (2022 est.)
- Import goods: machinery and equipment, foodstuffs, chemicals, construction materials
- Main import partners: China 22%; France 21%; United Arab Emirates 5%; United States 5%; Belgium 4% (2022 est.)
- Gross external debt: $6.06 billion (2022 est.)

Public finance
- Government debt: 73.3% of GDP (2024 est.)
- Foreign reserves: $1.372 billion (2019 est.)
- Revenue: $3.45 billion (2026 est.)
- Spending: $2.732 billion (2021 est.)
- Economic aid: recipient: $331 million (1995)
- Credit rating: Standard & Poor's: BB- (Domestic); BB- (Foreign); BBB- (T&C Assessment)
- All values, unless otherwise stated, are in US dollars.

Gabon has a developing economy. It is characterized by strong links with France, large foreign investments, dependence on skilled foreign labor, and decline of agriculture. It has a per capita income four times that of most nations of Africa, but its reliance on resource extraction industry fails to release much of the population from extreme poverty; as much as 30% of the population lives under the poverty threshold. Gabon had a free market economy from the 1990s, although some sources described Gabon as a mixed economic system with a heavy reliance on oil, combined with relatively weak centralized economic planning and government regulation. Current President Brice Clotaire Oligui Nguema initially advocated for a free market economy system, but since mid-2025 has embraced economic nationalism, which shows in his support of nationalization.

== Resources ==
The country is rich in natural resources such as timber, manganese and oil. The country is the fifth largest oil producing nation in Africa, which has helped drive its strong growth in the later 20th century.

The oil sector now accounts for 50% of GDP and 80% of exports. Although there have been recent offshore finds, oil production is now declining from its peak of 370,000 barrels per day (59,000 m^{3}/d) in 1997, and periods of low oil prices have had a negative impact on government revenues and the economy. In 2012 there were six active oil rigs in Gabon.

As of 2023, Gabon produces about 200,000 barrels a day (bpd) of crude oil.

The government has plans to diversify its economy away from its dwindling oil reserves. The government announced in 2012 that it would reassess exactly how much iron ore the Belinga site contains before awarding the concession to a mining company, most likely to be China's CMEC, which temporarily secured the rights to the ore in 2007.

Around 80% of Gabonese live in cities. The capital city, Libreville is home to 59% of the total population. The remainder of the country is still sparsely populated, as those areas remain densely forested.

== Statistics ==
GDP - composition by sector:
agriculture: 5.7%
industry: 53,53%
services: 37% (2008 est.)

Population below poverty line: NA%

Household income or consumption by percentage share:
lowest 10%: NA%
highest 10%: NA%

Inflation rate (consumer prices): 5% (2008 est.)

Labour force: 592,000 (2008 est.)

Labour force - by occupation: agriculture 60%, services and government 25%, industry and commerce 15% (2000 est.)

Unemployment rate: 21% (2006 est.)

Budget:
revenues: $4.46 billion
expenditures: $2.75 billion (2008 est.)

Industries: food and beverage; textile; lumbering and plywood; cement; petroleum extraction and refining; manganese, uranium, and gold mining; chemical production; ship repair

Industrial production growth rate: 1.5% (2008)

Oil - production 244,000 bbl/d (38,800 m^{3}/d) (2007 est.)

Oil - consumption 13,170 bbl/d (2,094 m^{3}/d) (2007 est.)

Oil - exports 255,000 bbl/d (40,500 m^{3}/d) (2005 est.)

Oil - imports 2,485 bbl/d (395.1 m^{3}/d) (2005 est.)

Oil - proven reserves 2 billion barrels (320×10^{6} m^{3}) (1 January 2008 est.)

Natural gas - production 100 million cu m (2006 est.)

Natural gas - consumption 100 million cu m (2006 est.)

Natural gas - exports 0 cu m (2007 est.)

Natural gas - imports 0 cu m (2007 est.)

Natural gas - proven reserves 28.32 billion cu m (1 January 2008 est.)

Electricity - production: 1.671 TWh (2006 est.)

Electricity - production by source:
fossil fuel: 27.8%
hydro: 72.2%
nuclear: 0%
other: 0% (1998)

Electricity - consumption: 1.365 GWh (2006 est.)

Electricity - exports: 0 kWh (2006 est.)

Electricity - imports: 0 kWh (1998)

Agriculture - products: cocoa, coffee, sugar, palm oil, rubber; cattle; okoume (a tropical hardwood); fish

Current account - balance $591 million (2010 est.)

Currency: 1 Communauté financière africaine franc (CFAF) = 100 centimes

Exchange rates: Communauté financière africaine francs (CFAF) per US$1 – 507.71 (2010), 472.19 (2009), 447.81 (2008), 481.83 (2007), 522.89 (2006), 647.25 (January 2000), 615.70 (1999), 589.95 (1998), 583.67 (1997), 511.55 (1996), 499.15 (1995)
note: since 1 January 1999, the CFAF is pegged to the euro at a rate of 655.957 CFA francs per euro

== Macroeconomic statistics ==
Exports of Gabon by product category (2019) Chemical products Transportation Machines Mineral products Plastics and rubbers Metals Foodstuffs Precious metals Textiles Instruments Animal products Vegetable products Paper goods Footwear and headwear Miscellaneous Stone and glass Wood products Animal and vegetable bi-products Animal hides Arts and antiques Weapons

The following table shows the main economic indicators in 1980–2026. Inflation below 5% is in green.

Year	GDP (in bil. US$ PPP)	GDP per capita (in US$ PPP)	GDP (in bil. US$ nominal)	GDP growth (real, %)	Inflation (%)	Government debt (% of GDP)
1980	5.9	7947	4.6	0.0	▲12.3	n/a
1985	▲8.7	▲10410	▼3.7	▲5.8	▲7.3	n/a
1990	▲10.5	▲11335	▲6.3	▲5.1	▲15.4	▲90
1995	▲13.8	▲13000	▼5.3	▲5.0	▲9.6	▼73.4
2000	▲15.2	▼12645	▲5.4	▼-1.9	▲0.5	▼72.5
2005	▲18.6	▲13661	▲9.5	▲3.9	▲1.2	▼41.7
2006	▼18.5	▼13240	▲10.2	▼-3.6	▲-1.4	▼34.9
2007	▲20.2	▲14059	▲12.5	▲6.5	▲5.0	▲39.2
2008	▼20.0	▼13387	▲15.6	▼-3.0	▲5.3	▼20.1
2009	▼19.9	▼12821	▼12.2	▼-1.2	▲1.9	▲26
2010	▲21.6	▲13424	▲14.4	▲7.4	▲1.4	▼21.3
2011	▲23.6	▲14135	▲18.2	▲7.1	▲1.3	▲21.4
2012	▲25.3	▲14599	▼17.2	▲5.3	▲2.7	21.4
2013	▲27.2	▲15078	▲17.6	▲5.5	▲0.5	▲31.1
2014	▲28.9	▲15459	▲18.2	▲4.4	▲4.5	▲34.1
2015	▲30.3	▲15689	▼14.4	▲3.9	▲-0.1	▲44.7
2016	▲31.2	▲15764	▼14.0	▲2.1	▲2.1	▲64.5
2017	▲31.9	▼15761	▲14.9	▲0.5	▲2.7	▼62.9
2018	▲34.0	▲16587	▲16.8	▲0.9	▲4.8	▼62.3
2019	▲36.2	▲17385	▲16.9	▲3.8	▲2.0	▼59.8
2020	▼33.6	▼15952	▼15.4	▼-1.8	▲1.7	▲83
2021	▲44.0	▲20624	▲19.5	▲1.5	▲1.1	▼72.9
2022	▲48.6	▲22482	▲20.5	▲3.0	▲4.3	▼65.6
2023	▲51.6	▲23365	▼20.1	▲2.4	▲3.6	▲70.6
2024	▲54.7	▲24227	▲20.9	▲3.4	▲1.2	▲70.9
2025	▲57.7	▲25000	▲21.6	▲2.5	▲2.0	▲78.9
2026	▲60.9	▲25847	▲23.4	▲2.7	▲2.5	▲86.1

== See also ==
- Agriculture in Gabon
- Economy of Africa
- Forestry in Gabon
- List of companies based in Gabon
- Mining in Gabon
- Transport in Gabon
- Chronology of Gabon
- United Nations Economic Commission for Africa
