= Airmax =

Airmax or Air Max may refer to:

- Nike Air Max, a line of shoes first released by Nike, Inc.
- AirMax, a proprietary wireless protocol and wireless product brand developed by Ubiquiti Networks
- Air Max Africa, an airline based in Libreville, Gabon
- AirMax SeaMax, a Brazilian single-engine, amphibious light sport aircraft

== See also ==
- Airmax Muzik II, 6th studio album by German rapper Fler
