= Timeline of Libreville =

The following is a timeline of the history of the city of Libreville, Gabon.

== 19th century ==
- 1843 - Fort and trading post established by French.
- 1849
  - Libreville founded by French military official Édouard Bouët-Willaumez. Freed Vili slaves were resettled in the new village.
  - M. Mountier, a resettled former slave, becomes mayor (approximate date).
- 1860 - Town becomes administrative seat of colonial "French territories in the Gulf of Guinea" (approximate date).
- 1865 - Church of the Immaculate Conception built.
- 1888 - Libreville becomes administrative seat of colonial French Congo.

== 20th century ==
- 1904 - Administrative seat of colonial Congo Gabon moves from Libreville to Brazzaville.
- 1909 - Urban perimeter established.
- 1910 - Libreville becomes part of colonial French Equatorial Africa.
- 1940 - Roads built to Kango, Lambarene, and Owendo (approximate date).
- 1946 - Lumber processing factory built.
- 1955
  - Libreville attains commune status.
  - Roman Catholic diocese of Libreville established.
- 1956 - Léon M'ba becomes mayor.
- 1958 - Cathédrale Notre-Dame-de-l'Assomption de Libreville built.
- 1959 - Radiodiffusion-Télévision Gabonaise headquartered in city.
- 1960 - City becomes capital of the Republic of Gabon.
- 1964
  - March: 1964 United States Embassy in Libreville bombings occur.
  - Deepwater port opens in Owendo.
  - Population: 45,909 urban agglomeration.
- 1968 - Leon Mebiame Mba becomes mayor.
- 1970 - National University of Gabon established.
- 1974 - L'Union newspaper begins publication.
- 1976
  - June–July: Central African Games held in city.
  - Ntoutoume Obame appointed mayor.
- 1977 - July: Organisation of African Unity meeting held in Libreville.
- 1980 - Population: 185,000.
- 1981 - December: Anti-government protest.
- 1983
  - Centre International des Civilisations Bantu headquartered in city.
  - Jean Aveno Davin appointed mayor.
- 1989
  - Cleaude Damas Ozimo appointed mayor.
  - Meeting of the Association Internationale des Maires Francophones held in city.
- 1993
  - 27 April: 1993 Zambia national football team plane crash occurs.
  - Population: 420,000 (38% Fang, 28% Shira Punu, 12% Nzebi).
- 1994 - Centre Culturel Français opens.^{(fr)}
- 1996 - Mayoral election established per Decentralisation Law.
- 1997 - Paul Mba Abessole becomes mayor.

== 21st century ==
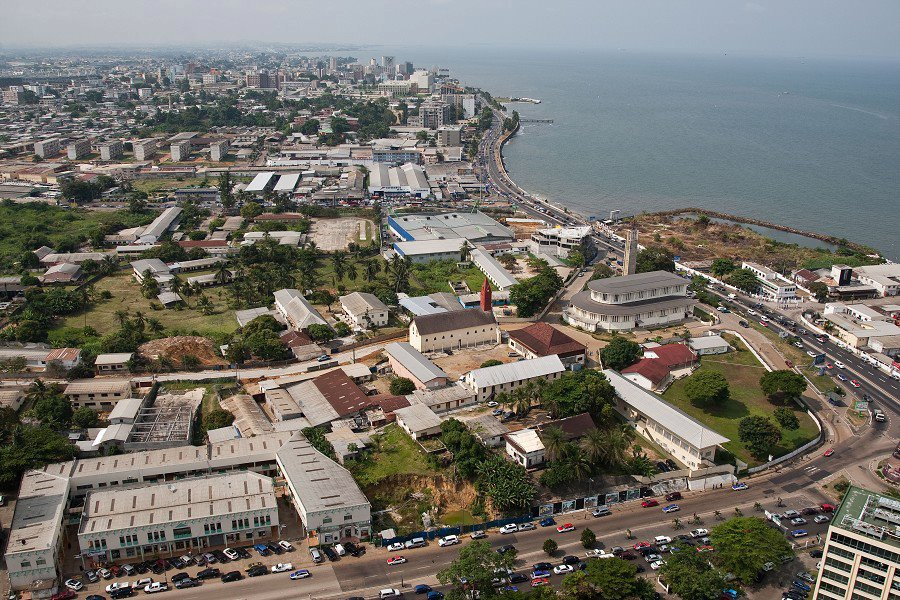
Aerial view of Libreville, 2012

- 2005 - November: Post-election unrest.
- 2006 - Population: 600,000 (approximate).
- 2008 - April: Gabonese local elections, 2008 held; Jean-François Ntoutoume Emane becomes mayor.
- 2010 - Akanda FC (football club) formed.
- 2011
  - Institut français du Gabon headquartered in city.
  - Stade d'Angondjé (stadium) opens.
- 2012 - 12 February: 2012 Africa Cup of Nations Final (football contest) held in Libreville.
- 2013 - Population: 703,939 urban agglomeration.
- 2014 - Rose Christiane Ossouka Raponda becomes mayor.
- 2016 - 31 August: Post-election protest begins.
- 2017 - 5 February: 2017 Africa Cup of Nations Final held in Libreville.

== See also ==
- Libreville history
- Chronology of Gabon

== Bibliography ==
in English

- Henry H. Bucher Jr. (1979). "Liberty and Labor: The Origins of Libreville Reconsidered". Bulletin de l'Institut fondamental d'Afrique noire. 41.
- François Ngolet (2005). "Libreville". In Kevin Shillington (ed.). Encyclopedia of African History. Fitzroy Dearborn. pp. 828–829. ISBN 978-1-57958-245-6.
- Hugues Steve Ndinga-Koumba Binza (2006). "Demographic profiles of Libreville and Lome". In S.B. Bekker; Anne Leildé (eds.). Reflections on Identity in Four African Cities. South Africa: African Minds. ISBN 978-1-920051-40-2. (about Cape Town, Johannesburg, Libreville, Lomé)
- Peter P. Hinks; John R. McKivigan, eds. (2007). "Libreville". Encyclopedia of Antislavery and Abolition. Greenwood. p. 432+. ISBN 978-0-313-33144-2.
- Eric Young (2010). "Libreville, Gabon". In Kwame Anthony Appiah; Henry Louis Gates (eds.). Encyclopedia of Africa. Oxford University Press. p. 51+. ISBN 9780195337709.

in French

- Guy Lasserre [in French] (1956). "Le paysage urbain des Librevilles noires". Cahiers d'Outre-Mer (in French). 9 – via Persee.fr.
- François Villien (1984). "Les consommations d'énergie à Libreville" [Consumption of energy in Libreville]. Cahiers d'Outre-Mer (in French). 37 – via Persee.fr.
- Rano-Michel Nguema (2005). "Développement de la ville, découpage et appropriation des territoires urbains au Gabon: le cas de Libreville". Belgeo (in French). 4 (4): 481–498. doi:10.4000/belgeo.12167 – via Revues.org.
- Anicet Mboumba (2013). "La difficile mutation du gouvernement urbain au Gabon: jeux d'acteurs dans la gestion des déchets à Libreville" [Problem of urbanization in Gabon]. Cahiers d'Outre-Mer (in French). 66 (261): 69–84. doi:10.4000/com.6778 – via Revues.org.
- Fidèle Allogho-Nkoghe (2014). La fondation de Libreville: une lecture nouvelle à partir d'une théorie géopolitique (in French). Paris: Connaissances et Savoirs. ISBN 9782753902411.
- Jean-Emery Etoughe-Efe (2017). Les Bars Populaires de Libreville. Études africaines (in French). Paris: L’Harmattan. ISBN 978-2-343-12257-1.
