= Fuligny =

Commune in Grand Est, France

- Commune
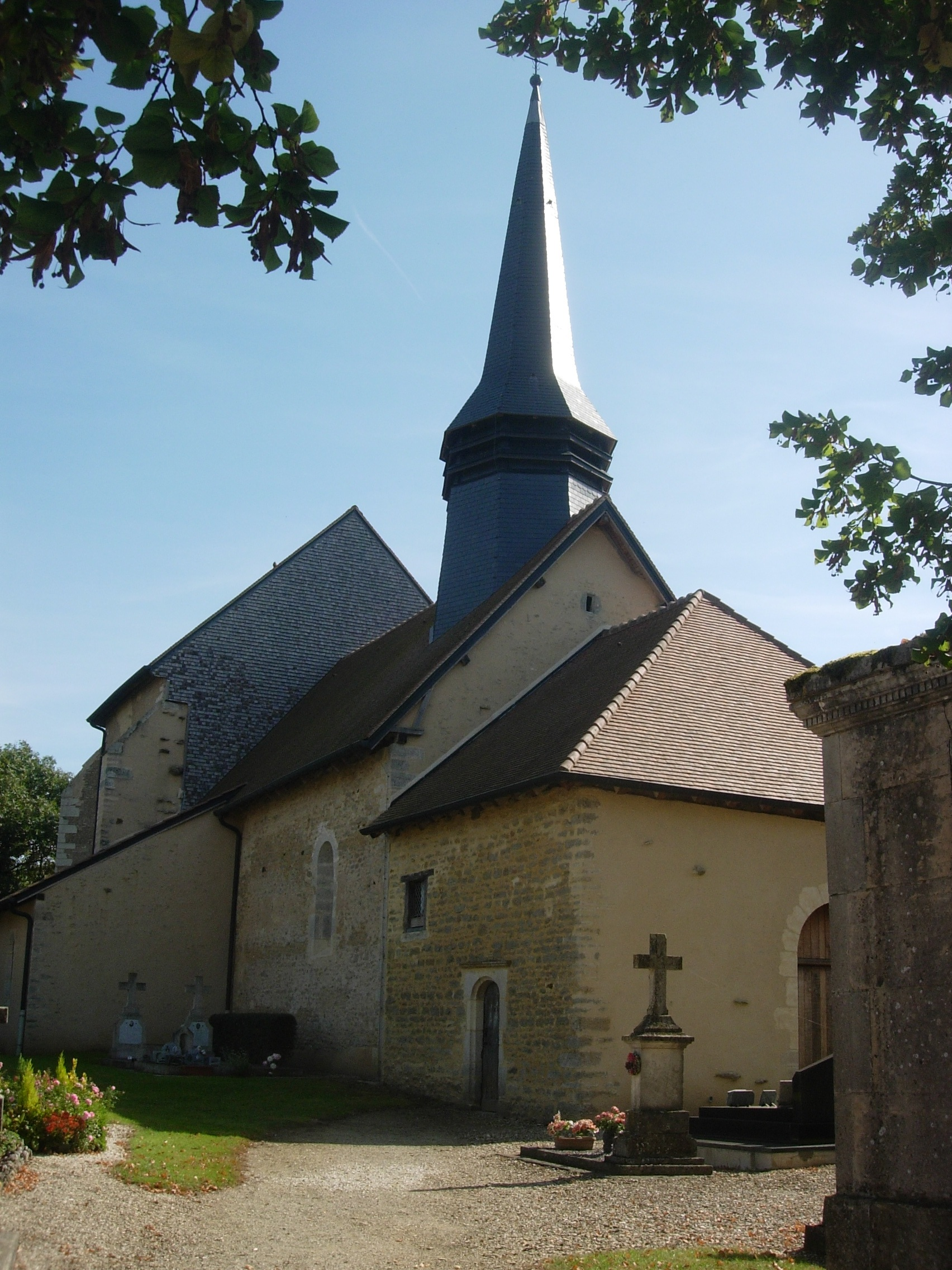
- The church in Fuligny
- Location of Fuligny
- Location within France Location within Grand Est
- Coordinates: 48°19′57″N 4°42′27″E
- Country: France
- Region: Grand Est
- Department: Aube
- Arrondissement: Bar-sur-Aube
- Canton: Bar-sur-Aube

Government
  - Mayor (2020–2026): Philippe Lehmann
- Area^{1}: 10.34 km^{2} (3.99 sq mi)
- Elevation: 230 m (750 ft)
- Population (2023): 40
  - Density: 3.9/km^{2} (10/sq mi)
- Time zone: UTC+01:00 (CET)
  - Summer (DST): UTC+02:00 (CEST)
- INSEE/Postal code: 10163 /10200
- ^{1} French Land Register data, which excludes lakes, ponds, glaciers > 1 km^{2} (0.386 sq mi or 247 acres) and river estuaries.

Fuligny (French pronunciation: [fyliɲi]) is a commune in the Aube department in north-central France.

== Population ==
Historical population
| Year | Pop. | ±% p.a. |
|---|---|---|
| 1968 | 92 | — |
| 1975 | 75 | −2.88% |
| 1982 | 69 | −1.18% |
| 1990 | 54 | −3.02% |
| 1999 | 54 | +0.00% |
| 2007 | 51 | −0.71% |
| 2012 | 54 | +1.15% |
| 2017 | 45 | −3.58% |
| 2023 | 40 | −1.94% |
Source: INSEE

== Notable people ==
- Victor de Compiègne (1846-1877) - explorer of Gabon

== See also ==
- Communes of the Aube department
