= List of banks in Gabon =

This is a list of commercial banks in Gabon, as updated in late 2024 by the Professional Association of Credit Institutions of Gabon.

== List of commercial banks ==
- AFG Bank
- BGFIBank, part of BGFIBank Group
- Banque Internationale pour le Commerce et l'Industrie du Gabon (BICIG), part of Vista Bank Group
- Union Gabonaise de Banque (UGB), part of Attijariwafa Bank Group
- United Bank for Africa Gabon (UBA), part of UBA Group
- Orabank Gabon, part of Orabank Group
- Ecobank Gabon, part of Ecobank Group
- Citibank Gabon, part of Citigroup
- Alios Finance Gabon, part of Alios Finance Group
- Finatra (Financière Transafricaine), also part of BGFIBank Group

== See also ==
- List of banks in Africa
- Central Bank of Central African States
- List of companies based in Gabon
