= Gråå BK =

Swedish volleyball club

- Short name: GBK
- Founded: 1976
- Ground: Gothenburg, Sweden

Gråå BK is a Swedish volleyball club located in Gothenburg and was formed in 1976. It consists of a women's and a men's team playing in the third Swedish division.
