= Victor de Compiègne =

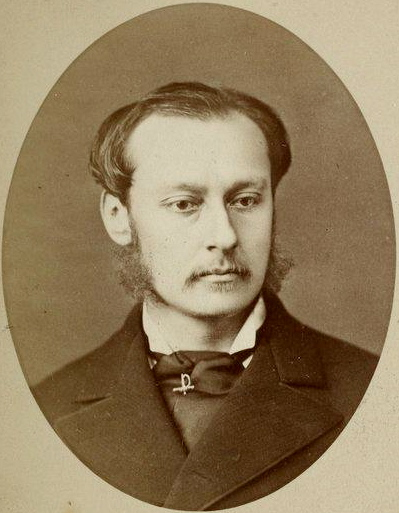
- Photograph by Alexandre Quinet
- Born: 22 July 1846; Fuligny, Champagne, France
- Died: 28 February 1877 (aged 30); Cairo, Egypt
- Occupation: Explorer

Louis-Alphonse-Henri-Victor du Pont, marquis de Compiègne (22 July 1846 – 28 February 1877), known as Victor de Compiègne, was a 19th-century French explorer. With his friend Antoine-Alfred Marche he explored the course of the Ogooué River in Gabon between 1872 and 1874.

== Life ==
=== Early years ===
Alphonse Louis Henri Victor Du Pont de Compiègne was born on 22 July 1846 in Fuligny, a small village in Champagne, near Bar-sur-Aube. He was the oldest child in the family, and had two sisters and one brother. His father died at the age of 34 in 1857. Her mother, née Noémie de Meyronnet Châteauneuf, became a widow at 30 years of age.

Victor was sent to Jesuit boarding school in Paris. He was a brilliant pupil, and obtained his baccalauréat and a law degree. At the age of 22 he was appointed a second class auditor of the Council of State. He was then sent on a mission to Algeria where he discovered another continent. He returned to Paris in 1868. Aged 22, he was intoxicated by the capital and its parties, and incurred many debts. A family council met, cleared the debts, but forced the young man to become more responsible.

He then decided to go to the United States for several years. His vocation as an explorer took him to New York in Christmas of 1869. He went to Florida, which he explored with few resources. He crossed the Everglades, lived by hunting, and discovered the American people. He made this trip the subject of a book.

When the Franco-Prussian War broke out in 1870 he immediately returned to France and enlisted as a simple soldier. He was taken prisoner and sent to Wesel, a small garrison town near Holland. He was released in March 1871 and returned to Champagne. When the Paris Commune insurrection broke out in 1871, he sided with the Versailles government and joined the ranks of the Seine Volunteers^{[fr]}. He participated in fighting in Paris which left him with a tragic and unforgettable impression that he would describe in his writings. Once the war ended, he left for South America, Panama, Nicaragua and Lake Maracaibo.

=== French Equatorial Africa ===
Ogooué River basin

He returned to France in the spring of 1872 and met Aimé Bouvier, to whom he explained his plan to explore the sources of the Ogooué River in French Equatorial Africa. Bouvier presented the plan to the naturalist Antoine-Alfred Marche, who had similar ambitions. They were then sponsored by the Société de Géographie (Geographic Society), which granted them a subsidy. The Ogooué had been mentioned in the accounts of the explorer Paul Du Chaillu, published in 1859, which whetted the curiosity of Victor. In 1867, Paul Augustin Serval, an officer in the Navy, discovered the river when travelling by land. At the same time, Ship Lieutenant Aymar explored it up to its confluence with the Ngounié River 170 miles from its mouth. The Ogooué was then considered as one of the best potential exploration routes to access the center of Africa.

On 1 November 1872, Victor embarked in Bordeaux preceded by Alfred Marche by a few weeks. They then made a survey of more than 400 kilometres (250 mi) of river that had previously been blank on the map. They studied the languages of the M'Pongwé and of other tribes. They established a very precise scientific catalog of the various specimens they brought back. Victor became the friend of N'Combé, the "Sun King", tribal chief at Adanlinanlago, on the bank of the Ogooué opposite Lambaréné. At the extreme point of their exploration, they were stopped by an attack of cannibals who massacred most of their carriers. They were forced to turn back. They arrived in Paris on 20 July 1874.

On 5 August 1874, Victor described his expedition before the members of the Geographic Society. His health had been affected by his tribulations, and due to malaria he could not undertake new explorations. Pierre Savorgnan de Brazza followed Victor's footsteps in Gabon, helped by his notebooks, notes and observations, which he picked up in person at the family estate of champagne in Fuligny.

=== Cairo ===
Doctor Georg August Schweinfurth, a German explorer and friend of Victor, offered him the post of secretary general of the Khedival Geographic Society which had just been founded in Cairo. Victor accepted and arrived in Cairo in July 1875 on the liner Diemen. He became intensely active, working with Ferdinand de Lesseps and Auguste Mariette. He returned to Europe for the Brussels Geography Congress on 12 September 1876. He was then appointed a member of the Committee to definitively abolish slavery. He returned to Cairo in early February 1877.

On the occasion of a ball, on 20 February 1877, a German subject quarreled with him "over geographic questions" and insulted his companion. A duel was inevitable. It took place on 21 February in the morning, with pommel pistols. Victor deliberately shot over his opponent's head, while the latter lodged a ball behind his shoulder blade that could not be extracted. The wound became infected and Victor died on 28 February 1877 at the age of 30 after a long period of agony.

== Publications ==
- Martin, Laurent (1820-18..); Compiègne, Alphonse Louis Henri Victor Du Pont de, 1871, la Commune de Paris. Les Versaillais, [Moncrabeau] : Éd. Laville, DL 2012, p. 196
  - Louis Dupont, marquis de Compiègne (10 August 1875), "Souvenirs d'un versaillais pendant le second siège de Paris", Le Correspondant (Dossiers biographiques Boutillier du Retail.), Paris
- Compiègne, Alphonse Louis Henri Victor Du Pont de (1876), Voyages, chasses et guerres, par le marquis de Compiègne, Paris: Plon, p. 299, OCLC 1831225
- Voyage d'Exploration dans l'Afrique équatoriale, Paris 1874. OCLC 162582077
- L'Afrique équatoriale. Gabonais, Pahouins, Gallois, Paris, E. Plon et cie., 1875. OCLC 27819893 « L'Afrique Équatoriale T1 »
- L'Afrique équatoriale: Okanda, Bangouens, Osyéba, Paris, Plon, 1875. OCLC 25949715 « L'Afrique Équatoriale T2 »

== Sources ==
- Alphonse Louis Henri Victor Du Pont de Compiègne (1846-1877), BnF
