= Antoine-Alfred Marche =

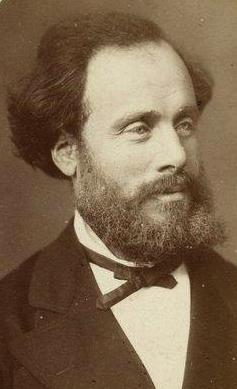
Antoine-Alfred Marche (1844–1898)

Antoine-Alfred Marche (15 February 1844, Boulogne-Billancourt – 31 August 1898, Paris, France) was a French naturalist and explorer. He visited Africa, the Philippines and finally the Mariana Islands. He made collections of various artifacts. He made a large collection of bird specimens from the Marianas between 22 April 1887 and May 1889 and some of them included new avian species (such as the golden white-eye, a bird described by Émile Oustalet).

In 1887, Marche was awarded the Legion d'Honneur. In his later years, he worked as an archivist in Tunis.

== Expeditions ==
=== Africa ===
He was involved in three expeditions to western Africa (1872, 1873–74 and 1875–77). On the second expedition he was joined by Victor de Compiègne (1846–77) in which he explored the Ogooué River. On his third African trip, he accompanied Pierre Savorgnan de Brazza, and collected numerous zoological specimens.

=== Philippines ===
From 1880 onward, Marche devoted several years conducting naturalist studies in the Philippines, via commission of the French government. He had a particular interest in burial sites and spent a great deal of time caving the areas of Boac, Gasan, Mogpog, and others. From this work in the region, Marche published his 1887 "Luçon et Palaouan, Six Années de Voyages aux Philippines (Luzon and Palawan, Six Years of Voyages in the Philippines)". In the modern era, his discovered artifacts are nationally exhibited as samples of Philippine art and antiquity.

== Taxa named after Alfred Marche ==
- Flame-breasted fruit dove, Ptilinopus marchei (Oustalet, 1880).
- Golden white-eye, Cleptornis marchei (Oustalet, 1889).
- Palawan hornbill, Anthracoceros marchei (Oustalet, 1885).
- Palawan stink badger, Mydaus marchei (Huet, 1887).
- Ivindomyrus marchei (Moelants, T. 2010).

== Published works ==
- Trois voyages dans l'Afrique occidentale : Sénégal, Gambie, Casamance, Gabon, Ogooué, Hachette, 1879 – Three voyages to western Africa, Senegal, Gambia, Casamance, Gabon and Ogooué.
- Luçon et Palaouan, six années de voyages aux Philippines, 1887 – Luzon and Palawan, six years of voyages in the Philippines.
- Exploration éthnographique de l'Ile Rota, Mariannes, 1889 – Ethnographic exploration of Rota Island.
- Rapport Général sur une mission aux Îles Mariannes, 1891 – General report on a mission to the Marianas.
- Note de voyage sur les Îles Marianes, 1898 – Notes on a voyage to the Marianas.
- "Luzon and Palawan ..." (translated by Carmen Ojeda and Jovita Castro, etc., 1970).
- "The Mariana Islands" (translated from the French by Sylvia E. Cheng, edited by Robert D. Craig, 1982).
