= Sky Gabon =

Cargo Airline from Gabon

IATA	ICAO	Call sign
GV	SKG	SKY GABON
- Founded: 2006
- Ceased operations: 2019
- Hubs: Libreville International Airport
- Destinations: 5
- Headquarters: Libreville, Gabon
- Website: www.skygabon.com

Sky Gabon was a cargo airline based in Libreville, Gabon. Its main base was Libreville International Airport. The airline was on the list of air carriers banned in the European Union. In 2019 the airline ceased all operations.

== Destinations ==
Sky Gabon operated the following services (as of 22 April 2012):

- Cameroon
  - Douala - Douala International Airport
- Equatorial Guinea
  - Malabo - Malabo International Airport
- Gabon
  - Libreville - Libreville International Airport
  - Port-Gentil - Port-Gentil International Airport
- Republic of the Congo
  - Pointe Noire - Pointe Noire Airport

== Fleet ==
Sky Gabon leased a Fokker F27-400 in 2013.
