= Air Excellence =

Airline based in Libreville, Gabon

IATA	ICAO	Call sign
-	-	-
- Founded: 2002
- Ceased operations: 2004
- Hubs: Libreville International Airport
- Fleet size: 1
- Headquarters: Libreville, Gabon

Air Excellence was an airline based in Libreville, Gabon. It was established in 2002 and ceased operations in 2004.

== Fleet ==
As of August 2006 the Air Excellence fleet included:

- 1 Antonov An-28
- Beech Baron
- Hawker Siddeley HS 748
