= BGFIBank Group =

Financial service

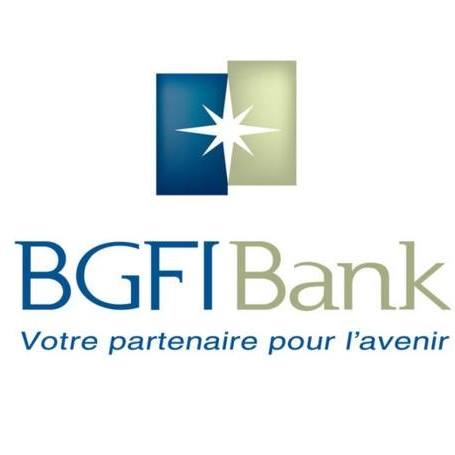
- Type: Private
- Industry: Banking and finance
- Founded: 1971
- Headquarters: Libreville, Gabon,
- Key people: Patrice Otha, chairman Henri-Claude Oyima, chief executive officer
- Products: Loans, mortgages investments, debit cards, credit cards
- Website: Homepage

BGFIBank Group, whose full name is BGFIBank Group S.A., is a financial services organization headquartered in Gabon. The group has subsidiaries in eight countries including Gabon, Benin, Republic of the Congo, Democratic Republic of the Congo, Equatorial Guinea, Cameroon, Madagascar, France and Côte d'Ivoire.

== Overview ==
BGFIBank Group is a large financial services conglomerate in Central, West and East Africa, with subsidiaries in ten countries. The member institutions serve both individuals and businesses, with emphasis on small-to-medium enterprises (SMEs). As of December 2010, the Group's assets were in excess of €3.7 billion. In January 2010, BGFIGroup was rated the largest bank group in Central Africa, by assets.

== History ==
In 1971, the group started with one institution in Gabon called Bank of Paris and the Netherlands Gabon. That first bank was a joint venture between several private Gabonese investors, BNP Paribas and the Netherlands.

The group's first subsidiary was set up in 1987 under the name FIGADIM and was later renamed BGFIBail. In 1996, when Gabonese private investors acquired majority shareholding in the bank, it rebranded as the International Gabonese and French Bank known in French, as "Banque Gabonaise et Française Internationale" (BGFI). The Group's second subsidiary, Financiere Transafricaine (Finatra), was established in 1997.

In 2000, the bank rebranded to BGFIBank S.A., which is its current name. During the next ten years, the group has pursued an aggressive expansion policy by opening a subsidiary in Republic of the Congo in 2000, Equatorial Guinea in 2001, France in 2007, Madagascar in 2010, Benin in 2010 and Democratic Republic of the Congo in 2010. During the same decade, a plethora of non-bank financial subsidiaries were set up by the group, the majority being located in Gabon.

At the beginning of 2022, BGFI Cameroon announces the opening of a service dedicated to retail banking. The bank competes directly with First Bank and Société Générale in this market segment.

== Congo Hold-Up leak ==
Congo Hold-Up, the largest leak from the African continent to date, reveals how the commercial bank BGFIBank has been used to plunder the Democratic Republic of Congo’s public funds and natural resources, largely for the enrichment of former President Joseph Kabila’s inner circle. The Congo Hold-Up leak was initiated by French media Mediapart and The Platform to Protect Whistleblowers in Africa, is composed of over 3.5 million internal documents from the BGFIBank, including bank statements, emails, contracts, bills and corporate records.

== Member companies ==
The companies that composes the BGFIBank Group include:

Commercial banks

- BGFIBank Cameroon - Cameroon
- BGFIBank Gabon - Gabon
- BGFIBank Guinea - Equatorial Guinea
- BGFIBank International - France
- BGFIBank Congo - (Republic of the Congo) Republic of Congo
- BGFIBank Madagascar - Madagascar
- BGFIBank Benin - Benin
- BGFIBank DRC - Democratic Republic of the Congo

Other financial services companies

- BGFI Immo - Real estate business - - Gabon
- BGFI Asset Management - Portfolio management - - Gabon
- BGFIBail - Leasing - - Gabon
- BGFIBourse - Financial engineering, stockbroking and consultancy - Gabon
- Finatra - Consumer credit - - Gabon
- BGFICash - Funds transfer - - Gabon
- BGFIFactor - Factoring - - Gabon
- LOXIA Emf - Microfinance - - Gabon
- Socofin - Leasing and consumer credit Republic of the Congo

== Ownership ==
Shareholding in the Group's stock is private, although dynamic. New investors can buy in, while existing investors have the opportunity to divest. However, the Group's stock is not listed on any publicly traded exchange. The detailed shareholding in BGFIBank Group is illustrated in the table below:

BGFIBank Group stock ownership

Rank	Name of owner	Percentage ownership
1	Private investors	32.50
2	Gabon Development Bank	10.00
3	Delta Synergie	09.01
4	Financiére des Vosges	05.00
5	Compagnie du Komo	25.01
6	Carlo Tassara Asset Management	09.50
7	BGFIBank employees	08.98
	Total	100.00

== Governance ==
The chairman of the eleven-member board of directors is Patrice Otha. The chief executive officer of the group is Henri-Claude Oyima, and the general secretary is Brice Laccruche.

== See also ==
- List of banks in Gabon
- List of banks in Africa
- Central Bank of Central African States
