= Nouvelle Air Affaires Gabon =

Airline of Gabon

IATA	ICAO	Call sign
–	NVS	NOUVELLE AFFAIRES
- Founded: 1975
- Ceased operations: 2013
- Hubs: Libreville International Airport
- Fleet size: 6
- Headquarters: Libreville, Gabon

Nouvelle Air Affaires Gabon was an airline based in Libreville, Gabon. It operates corporate and freight charter services. Its main base is Libreville International Airport.

== History ==
Nouvelle Air Affaires Gabon, founded by Raymond Bellangeras as Air Affaires Gabon, started on 30 June 1975 as a regional, domestic, passenger and cargo carrier. It was participating in supporting the construction of the Trans-Gabon Railway railroad line in the 1970s. and merged with Gabon Air Transport to form the new airline in 1996.

Following the closure of Afrijet and Gabon Airlines, Nouvelle Air Affaires Gabon is the last carrier in Gabon not on the list of air carriers banned in the European Union.

With Hermine Bongo Ondimba as CEO since 2005, the company had to downsize despite contacts with Shell. In 2013 bankruptcy was declared.

== Fleet ==
The Air Affaires Gabon fleet includes the following aircraft (as of 10 February 2010):

- 1 Challenger 601
- 1 Cessna 208
- 1 Bombardier Dash 8-Q300 (as of August 2019)
- 1 Hawker 800XP
- 2 Raytheon Beech 1900D Airliner

The airline fleet previously included the following aircraft:

- 1 Fokker 100
