= FlyGabon =

Flag carrier of Gabon

IATA	ICAO	Call sign
J7	ABS	AFRIJET
- Founded: 7 February 2024; 2 years ago
- Commenced operations: 31 August 2024; 2 years ago
- Fleet size: 8
- Destinations: 19
- Website: www.flygabon.online/en

FlyGabon is the flag carrier of Gabon.

== History ==
The airline in 2024 received its first ATR 72 and would as a result have the youngest fleet age in Africa and would beacome the youngest ATR operator in Africa. Around the same time it would introduce an Airbus A320 to its fleet. this aircraft was configured to have 126 seats.

NAHCO would renew its contracts and would add FlyGabon to its list in 2025. This contract will last 3 years.

In 2026 the airline secured its first Boeing 737 and began to eye international routes such as Paris and London, the aircraft they purchased was formerly operated by China Southern Airlines.

On May 12, 2026, FlyGabon started Lagos operations which increased its destinations to 19.

== Fleet ==
As of July 2026, FlyGabon operates the following aircraft:

Fleet Of FlyGabon
Aircraft	In service	Orders	Pax. Capacity
ATR 42-600	1	–	
ATR 72-600	4	–	
