= Gabon Airlines =

Airline of Gabon

IATA	ICAO	Call sign
GY	GBK	GABON AIRLINES
- Founded: 2007
- Ceased operations: 2012
- Hubs: Libreville International Airport
- Headquarters: Libreville, Gabon
- Website: www.gabonairlines.com

Gabon Airlines was a Gabonese airline, headquartered in Libreville. It operated from 2007 to 2012, concentrating on African and European flight services out of Libreville International Airport. In April 2015, the Gabonese government signed an agreement with Air France to create a second incarnation of Gabon Airlines as a flag carrier. However, the new airline has yet to commence operations.

== First iteration: 2007–2012 ==
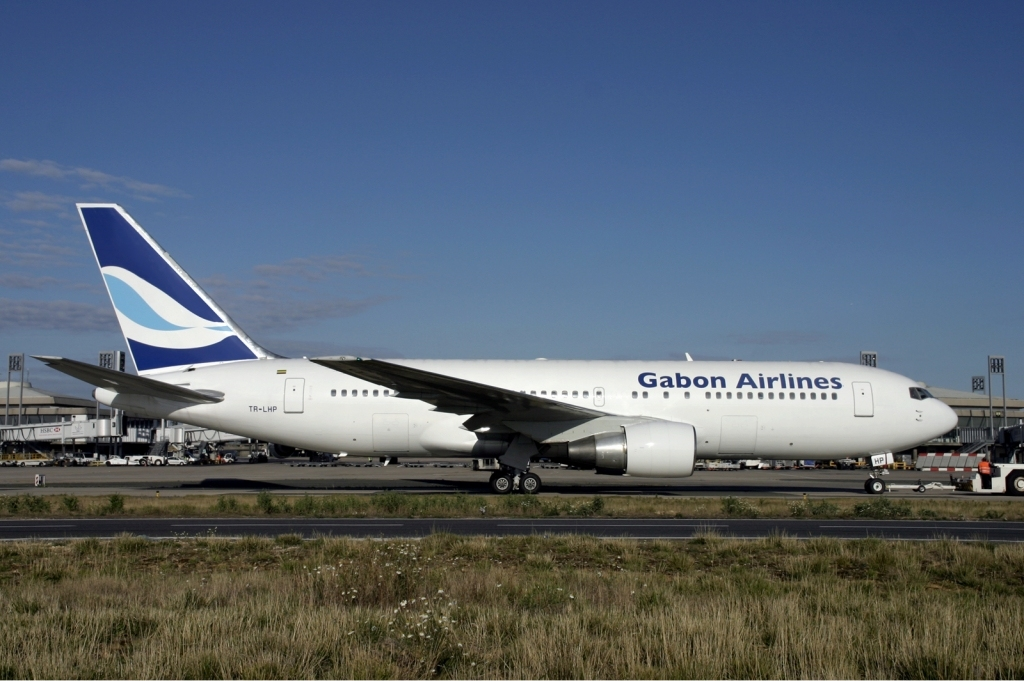
Gabon Airlines Boeing 767-200 (13 August 2007)

Gabon Airlines began operations in 2007. It handled both cargo and passenger flights. It replaced Air Gabon, which had shut down in 2006.

After having been granted official permission by the Gabonese transport minister on 8 November 2006, the airline was founded in 2007 by private investors, banks and insurers, the CEO being Christian Bongo Ondimba, a son of former Gabonese president Omar Bongo. The first revenue flight of Gabon Airlines took place on 11 April 2007 and went from Libreville to Paris. Flights to South Africa and other Central African countries followed suit.

As of 2011, Gabon Airlines was flying to Paris, Marseille, Johannesburg, Pointe-Noire (Republic of the Congo), and the two largest cities of Gabon: Libreville and Port-Gentil. Its fleet consisted of two Boeing 767-200s.

Beginning in 2010, the airline faced significant financial difficulties. By 2011, the airline's staff had not been paid in months, and its aircraft was impounded in Addis Ababa for overdue maintenance fees. The impounded aircraft was later sold by the Ethiopians to recoup the debt, and the company did not fly after 2011, and lost its Air Operators Certificate in 2012. By 2013, the company was in liquidation.

== Attempts at a relaunch ==
A variety of attempts were made to relaunch the airline, even before its liquidation. In 2011, when Gabon Airlines flights had been grounded for six months due to financial difficulties, the Gabonese government announced it would be relaunching the national airline in 2012. In April 2015, the Gabonese government and Air France Consulting signed an agreement to manage the redeveloped national flag carrier, planned to be launched as early as June 2015.

The attempts to relaunch Gabon Airlines have not succeeded. Instead, the Gabonese government acquired a majority stake in AfriJet, and created a new FlyGabon brand for domestic flights. Despite an ongoing dispute over the ownership of the FlyGabon branding, AfriJet/FlyGabon has been operating as the national carrier for Gabon since 2024.

== Destinations ==
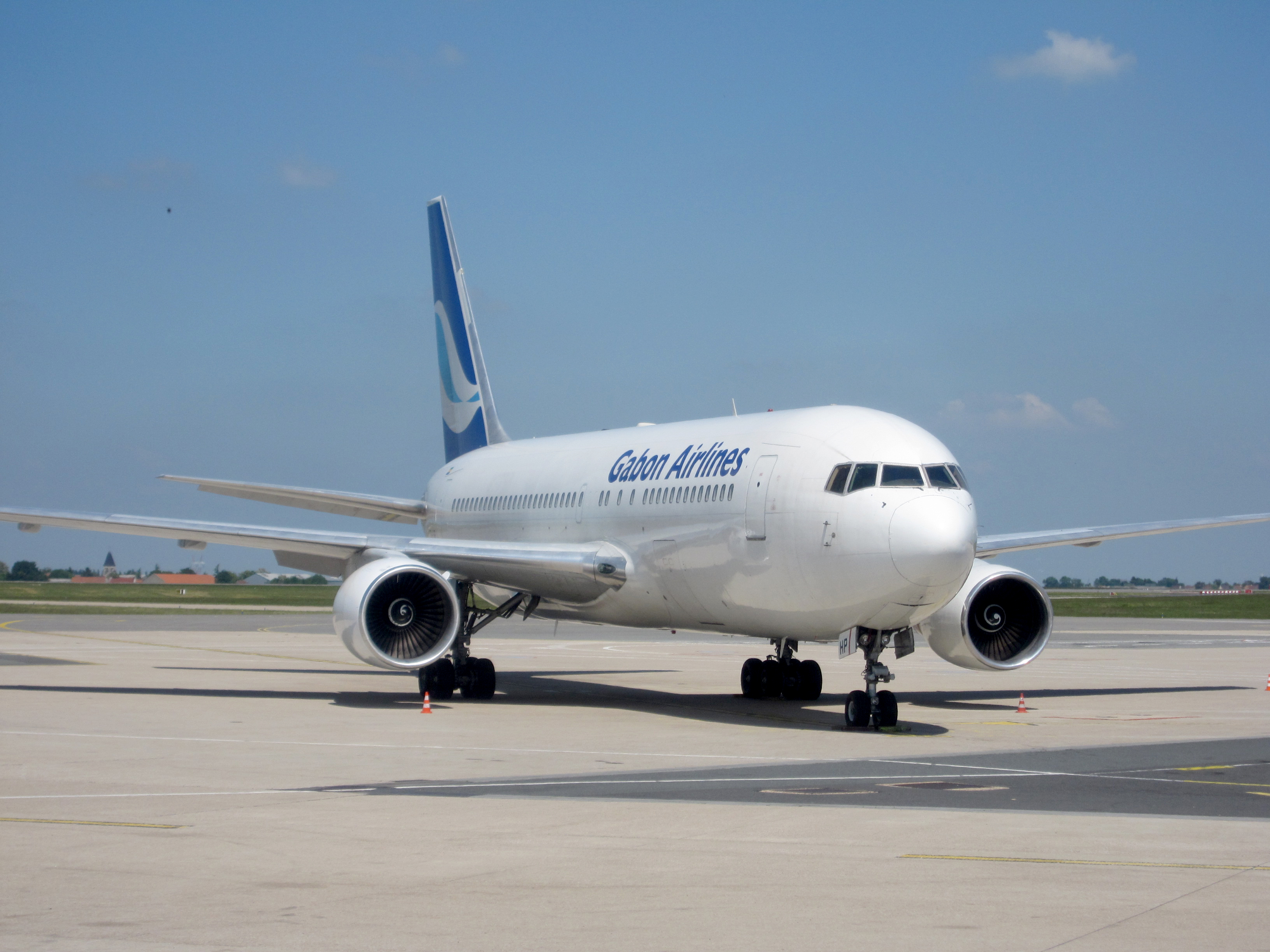
A Gabon Airlines Boeing 767-200 at Paris-Charles de Gaulle Airport (2010)

Gabon Airlines flew to the following destinations over the course of its operation:

Republic of the Congo

- Pointe Noire – Pointe Noire Airport
- Brazzaville – Maya-Maya Airport

France

- Marseille - Marseille Provence Airport
- Paris - Charles de Gaulle Airport

Gabon

- Libreville – Libreville International Airport
- Port-Gentil – Port-Gentil International Airport

South Africa

- Johannesburg – OR Tambo International Airport
