= Centre International des Civilisations Bantu =

The Centre International des Civilisations Bantu (CICIBA) is a cultural organization based in Libreville, Gabon. Established at the initiative of Gabonese president Omar Bongo on January 8, 1983, it is dedicated to the study of the Bantu peoples.

In 2012, it was announced that the center would be rehabilitated after its abandonment in 1988 for lack of funding.

CICIBA's member nations include Angola, Cameroon, Central African Republic, Comoros, Republic of the Congo, Democratic Republic of Congo, Equatorial Guinea, Gabon, Rwanda, São Tomé and Príncipe, and Zambia.
