= Air Max Africa =

Airline of Gabon

IATA	ICAO	Call sign
-	AZX	AZIMA
- Founded: 2002 (as Air Max-Gabon)
- Ceased operations: 2006
- Hubs: Libreville International Airport
- Fleet size: 1 (at closure)
- Headquarters: Libreville, Gabon
- Key people: Sulaiman Tchoreret (CEO)

Air Max Africa was an airline based in Libreville, Gabon. It was established in 2002 as Air Max Gabon and operated charter and passenger flights in West Africa out of Libreville International Airport. The airline was shut down in 2006.

== Fleet ==
As of August 2006 the Air Max-Gabon fleet included only a single turboprop Fokker F27 Mk300M.:
