= Air Gabon =

Airline of Gabon

Air Gabon Société Nationale Air Gabon
| IATA | ICAO | Call sign |
|---|---|---|
| GN | AGN | GOLF NOVEMBER |
- Founded: 1951 (as Compagnie Aerienne Gabonaise)
- Commenced operations: 1977 (as Air Gabon)
- Ceased operations: 2006
- Hubs: Libreville International Airport
- Frequent-flyer program: Perroquet-Plus
- Fleet size: 6
- Destinations: 11
- Parent company: Government of Gabon
- Headquarters: Libreville, Gabon
- Key people: Jérome Ngoua Bekale

Air Gabon was the national, state-owned airline of Gabon, operating out of Libreville International Airport to a variety of destinations across western and southern Africa, as well as to Europe. Founded in 1951, the airline went bankrupt in 2006.

== History ==
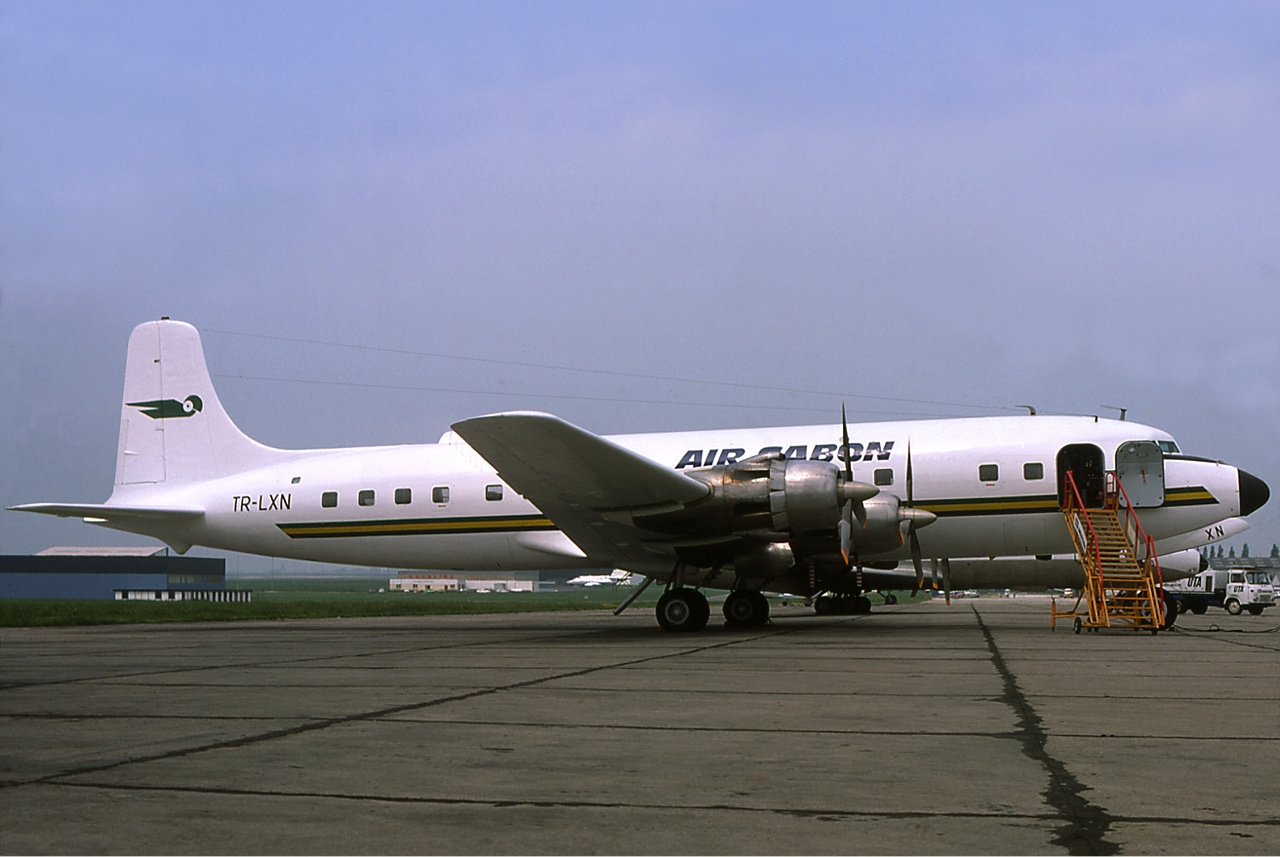
An Air Gabon Douglas DC-6 at Paris–Le Bourget Airport in 1977.

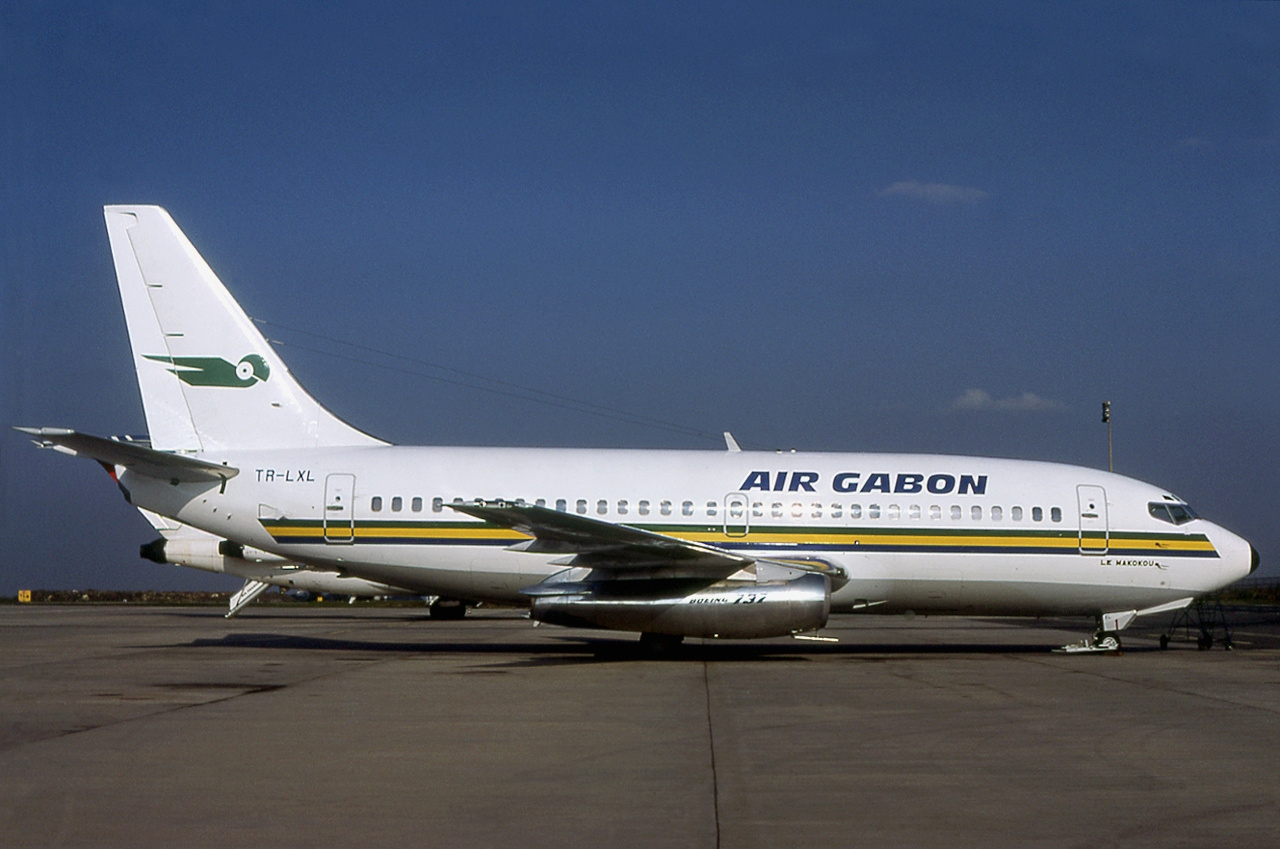
A Boeing 737-200 of Air Gabon at Charles de Gaulle Airport in 1978. This aircraft, TR-LXL, is still active with Air Inuit as C-GMAI as of 2026.

Air Gabon was founded in 1951 as Compagnie Aerienne Gabonaise operating regional flights out of Libreville using Beechcraft and De Havilland aircraft. It became the national flag carrier in 1968, then renamed Société Nationale Transgabon.

Compagnie Nationale Air Gabon was established in May 1977, after Gabon withdrew from the Air Afrique consortium in December 1976. The new airline was formed from the nucleus of Société Nationale Transgabon with the mandate to operate long-haul international services from Libreville. At the time of the airline's foundation, the fleet comprised three Fokker F-28s, two Douglas DC-6s, one Douglas DC-4, one de Havilland Canada DHC-5 Buffalo, and one Sud Aviation Caravelle. Ownership in the airline was shared between the Gabonese government (70%) and Sofepag (30%), an Air France-associated company.

In April 1977, the airline placed an order for a Boeing 747-200 and Boeing 737 at a cost of approximately US$55 million. In 1978 President of Gabon Omar Bongo gave the airline his personal transport, a Fokker F-28, for use on services. On 5 October the airline's Boeing 747, named President Léon M'ba, arrived as part of the wet lease agreement signed the previous year. On 26 February 1979 one of the airline's Douglas DC-6s crashed into a swamp 11 kilometres (6.8 mi) from Moanda, killing the aircraft's three occupants.

The DC-6s and DC-4 were replaced in 1979 by two Vickers Vanguard turboprops, and the airline's international route network was expanded to Marseille, Nice, Paris and Rome. Regionally, Air Gabon operated to ten African countries, and served 26 destinations on its domestic network. The airline leased and chartered various single engine aircraft in the early 1980s to operate services to domestic destinations which saw sporadic service, and in 1982 a CASA C-212 Aviocar operated with the airline for a short time. The airline ordered a Lockheed L-100-30 Hercules in 1984 after it was given a loan by the Export-Import Bank, which when delivered in late 1985 replaced the Vickers Vanguards.

In 1986, the airline underwent recapitalisation efforts, which saw the government's stake increase to eighty percent, with the French Sofepag's share decreasing to twenty percent. In 1989 the airline acquired a Fokker 100 and in 1993 two ATR 72s were ordered to replace the Fokker F28s. The airline commenced services to Johannesburg in South Africa in late 1993. By 1996, the airline had commenced direct services to London with the Boeing 747 Combi, and its international network saw services being operated from Libreville to Abidjan, Bamako, Bangui, Cotonou, Dakar, Douala, Geneva, Kinshasa, Johannesburg, Lagos, Lomé, Malabo, Marseille, Nice, Paris, Pointe-Noire and Rome.

The first flight for the reshaped airline went from Libreville to Lomé and Abidjan. The launch of European services from Libreville followed suit, with the inauguration of a regular flight to Paris (which was later dropped again). By then, the fleet consisted of two Fokker F28s, a Boeing 737-200 and a Boeing 747-200. Air Gabon restored Paris to Libreville flights in December 2004 with its Boeing 767-200, an aircraft type which had been introduced in 1998. In March 2006, Air Gabon was shut down shortly after bankruptcy. Initially, the launch of a new Gabonese national carrier as a joint-venture with Royal Air Maroc under the name Air Gabon International was planned, but has never materialized.

== Fleet ==
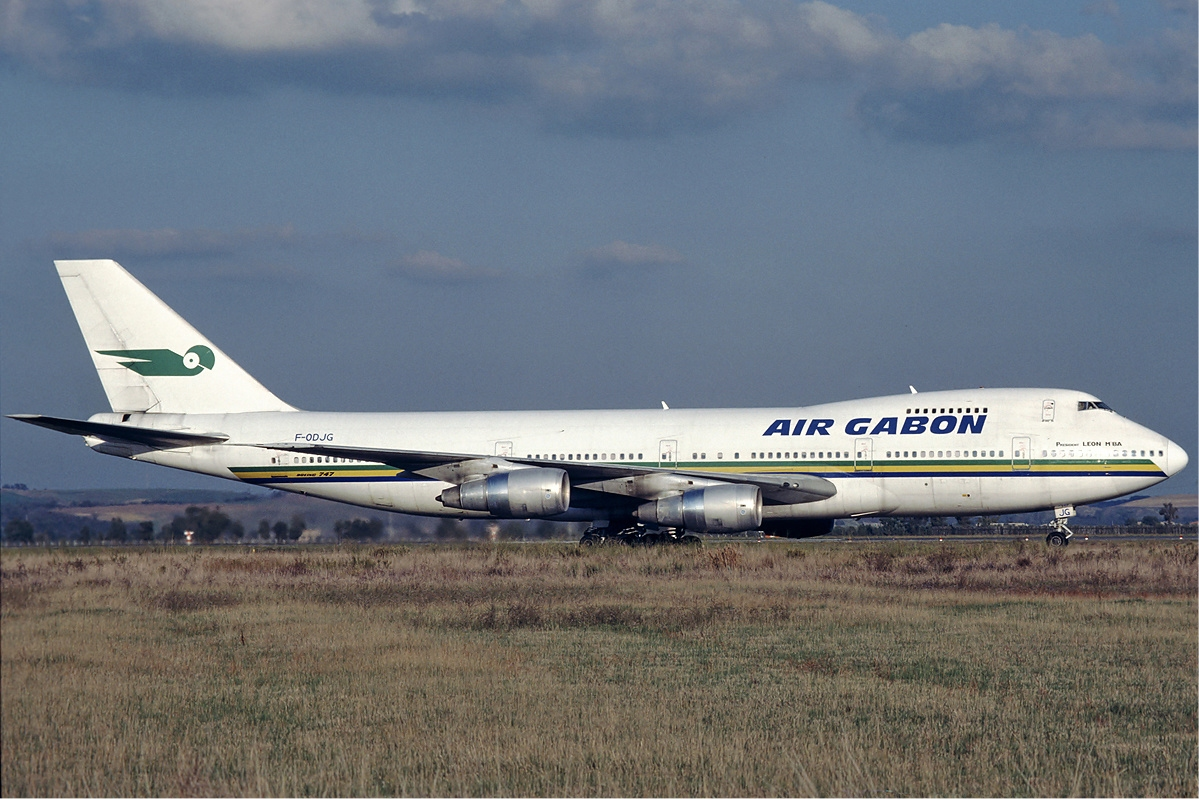
A Boeing 747-200 of Air Gabon at Leonardo da Vinci–Fiumicino Airport in 1988.

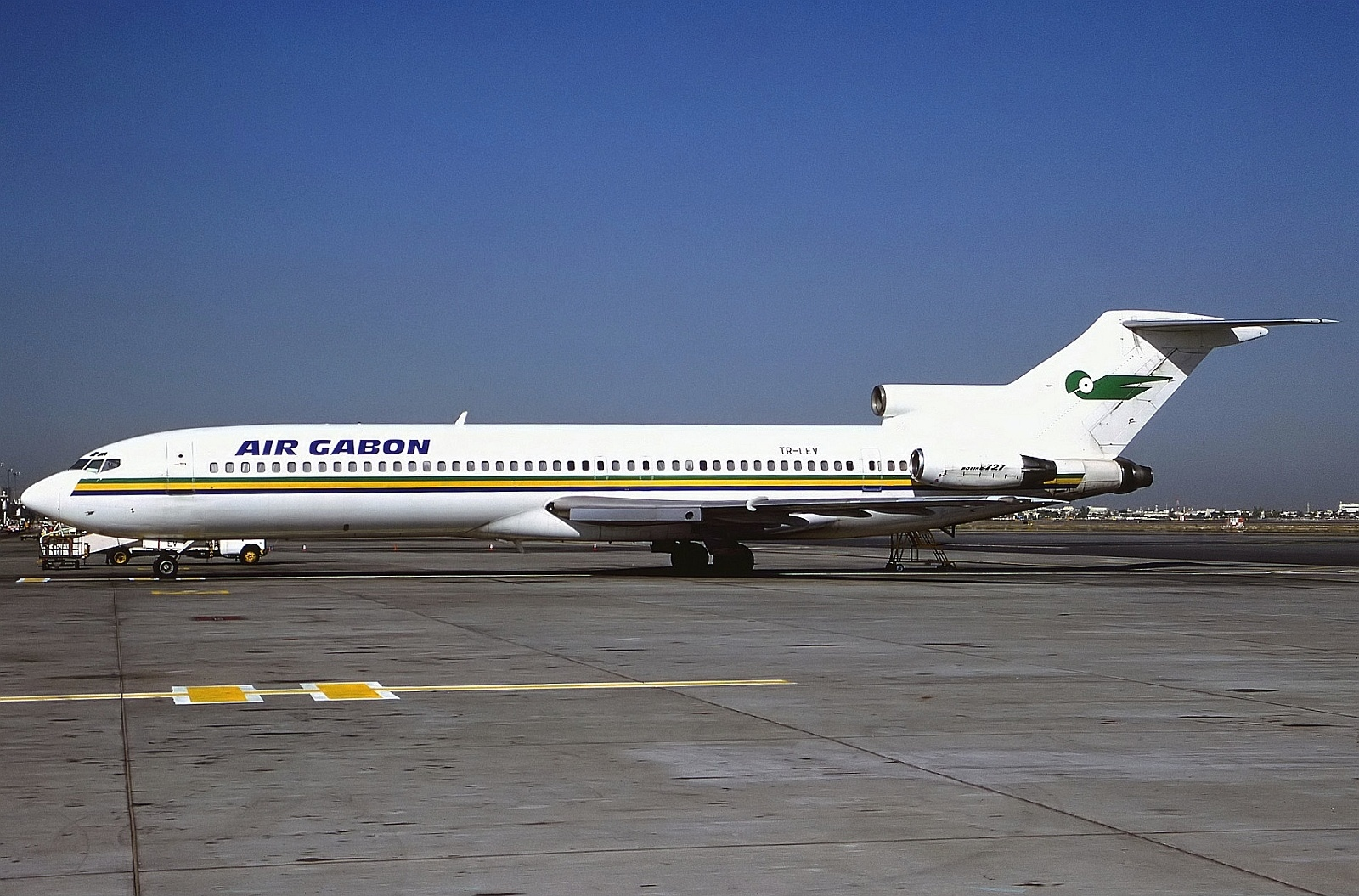
An Air Gabon Boeing 727 at Dubai International Airport in 1999.

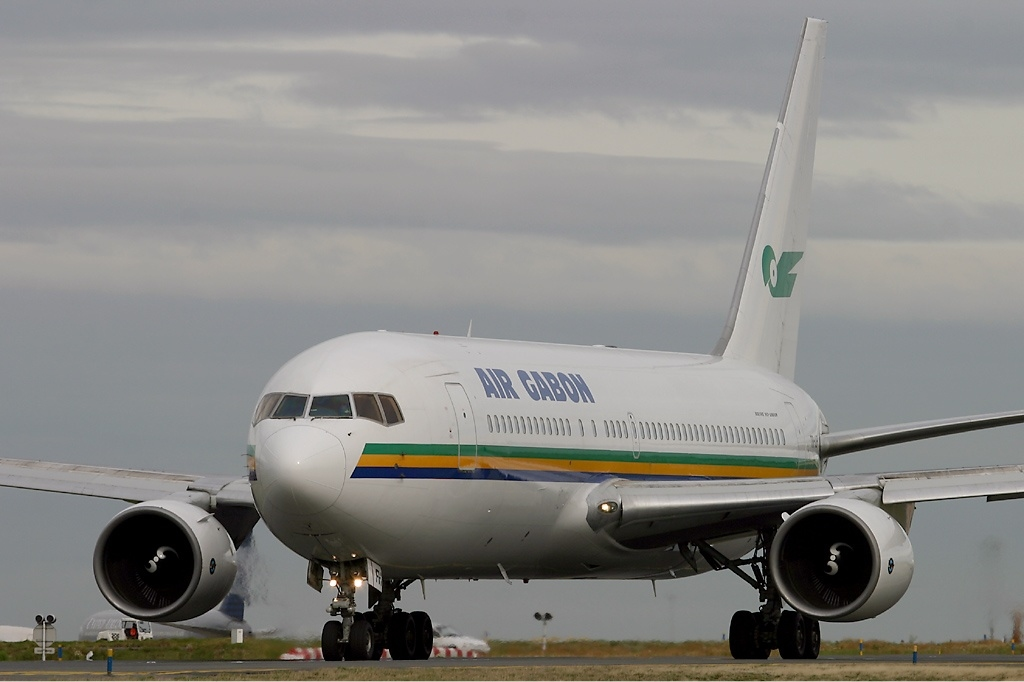
An Air Gabon Boeing 767-200 at Charles de Gaulle Airport in 2004.

Over the years, Air Gabon operated the following aircraft types:

Air Gabon fleet development
| Aircraft | Introduced | Retired |
|---|---|---|
| ATR 42 | 1997 | 2002 |
| ATR 72 | 1993 | 1995 |
| Boeing 737-200 | 1978 | 2004 |
| Boeing 737-300 | 2001 | 2006 |
| Boeing 737-400 | 2001 | 2005 |
| Boeing 747-200 | 1977 | 2005 |
| Boeing 767-200 | 1998 | 2006 |
| Boeing 767-300 | 2002 | 2005 |
| Boeing 727-200 | 2002 | 2005 |
| Fokker 100 | 1989 | 1994 |
| Fokker F28 | 1989 | 1994 |
| Douglas DC-6 | 1971 | 1984 |
| Douglas DC-4 | 1963 | 1978 |
| Vickers Vanguard | 1980 | 1987 |

== Accidents and incidents ==
- On 8 December 1994, at 10:40 local time, an Air Gabon ATR 72 (registered F-OHOC) veered off the runway at Oyem Airport upon landing after a flight from Bitam Airport. Even though the plane hit some trees, there were no fatalities among the 17 passengers and 4 crew members on board.
- On 9 August 1997, an Air Gabon Boeing 727 en route from Franceville to Kigali, Rwanda with more than 100 Rwandan refugees on board who were to be deported, was hijacked by two of the passengers who attacked the pilot twenty minutes after take-off and demanded the plane be diverted to South Africa. Instead, the pilot returned to Franceville, where the perpetrators surrendered to police forces.
- On 19 December 2003, Air Gabon Flight 471, a Boeing 737-300 (registered TR-LFZ) en route from Franceville to Libreville overran the runway upon landing at Libreville International Airport at 18:44 local time, after having circled the airport for 30 minutes due to bad weather. The aircraft crashed through a boundary fence and came to rest a few hundred metres behind the runway threshold. There were no fatalities among the 125 passengers and 6 crew members on board, but the plane was damaged beyond repair.
