= Cinema of Gabon =

The cinema of Gabon has had an uneven history. Though President Omar Bongo and his wife, Josephine Bongo, encouraged filmmaking in the 1970s, there was a 20-year hiatus until filmmaking started to grow again in the new millennium.

== History ==
French companies made documentaries in colonial Gabon from 1936 onwards.

After independence, Philippe Mory, Gabon's first professionally trained actor, organized the Compagnie Cinematographique du Gabon in 1962, and helped produce The Cage, a feature film entered into the 1963 Cannes Film Festival. The national television company supported films like Pierre-Marie Dong's Carrefour humain (1969) and Mory's Les tams-tams se sont tus (1972).

Though Gabon had only eight cinemas, President Omar Bongo and his wife Joséphine Bongo took a direct personal interest in film. The President built a 400-seat cinema in his presidential palace, and in 1975 founded the Centre National Du Cinéma with Mory as director. He also founded a production company, Les Films Gabonais. Gabon saw nine films from six directors in the 1970s. Les Films Gabonais produced several films co-directed by Dong and based on the writings of the presidential couple: Obali (1976) and Ayouma (1977) were based on plays examining social themes by Joséphine Bongo, and Demain, un jour nouveau (1978) was a version of the president's memoirs. Another Gabonese film from this period was Charles Mensah's Ilombe (1978).

== Contemporary cinema ==
After two decades of relative inactivity, Gabonese filmmaking started to rise again in the new millennium. Charles Mensah at the Centre National du Cinéma Gabonais (CENACI; later renamed Institut Gabonais de l'Image et du Son, or IGIS) had introduced new policies to restructure Gabonese cinema in the early 1990s.

Imunga Ivanga started making short films in the 1990s, and his feature film Dôlè (2000) was the first Gabonese feature film for two decades. It won festival awards at Carthage, Cannes and Milan.

Henri-Joseph Koumba Bididi made a number of short films, and the 2001 feature film The Elephant's Balls. Ivunga and Mory collaborated on L'Ombre de Liberty (2006), and in 2014 Ivunga was made general director of the national television network, Gabon Television. Amédée Pacôme Nkoulou's documentary Boxing Libreville (2018) has won several awards.

As of 2017, Canal Olympia was building new cinemas in Gabon.
