= List of 1995 films based on actual events =

This is a list of films and miniseries released in 1995 that are based on actual events. All films on this list are from American production unless indicated otherwise.

== 1995 ==
- A Single Spark (Korean: 아름다운 청년 전태일) (1995) – South Korean biographical drama film about Jeon Tae-il, a worker who protested labor conditions through self-immolation
- A Trick of Light (German: Die Gebrüder Skladanowsky) (1995) – German biographical drama film showing the birth of cinema in Berlin where Max Skladanowsky and his brother Emil built a projector they called the Bioscop
- Across the Sea of Time (1995) – adventure drama film centring around a real life Russian immigrant, searching for his family, who is given the name Leopold Minton by the Ellis Island immigration officials
- The Affair (1995) – romantic war drama television film about an African-American soldier in the United States Army who is deployed to England during World War II and has an affair with a British officer's wife
- Aletta Jacobs: The Highest Aspiration (Dutch: Aletta Jacobs: Het Hoogste Streven) (1995) – Dutch biographical drama film telling the story of a Dutch female student, doctor, feminist and campaigner for women's suffrage and birth control, Aletta Jacobs
- Almost Golden: The Jessica Savitch Story (1995) – biographical drama television film depicting the rapid rise to fame and untimely death of Jessica Savitch – one of America's first female news anchors
- Anne no Nikki (Japanese: アンネの日記) (1995) – animated biographical drama film based on Anne Frank's 1942–1944 The Diary of a Young Girl
- Apollo 13 (1995) – adventure biographical drama film dramatizing the aborted 1970 Apollo 13 lunar mission
- Bach's Fight for Freedom (1995) – Canadian-Czech biographical drama television film about Johann Sebastian Bach
- The Bait (French: L'Appât) (1995) – French crime drama film based on the "Valérie Subra affair", a true event that happened in 1984
- Balto (1995) – animated family adventure film loosely based on the true story of the eponymous dog who helped save children infected with diphtheria in the 1925 serum run to Nome
- The Basketball Diaries (1995) – biographical crime drama film telling the story of Jim Carroll's teenage years as a promising high school basketball player and writer who develops an addiction to heroin
- Big Dreams and Broken Hearts: The Dottie West Story (1995) – biographical drama television film about the life of country music singer Dottie West
- Blue Murder (1995) – Australian crime drama miniseries concerning the relationship between controversial former detective Roger "the Dodger" Rogerson and notorious criminal Arthur "Neddy" Smith
- Bombay (Tamil: பம்பாய்) (1995) – Indian Tamil-language romantic drama film telling the story of an inter-religious family in Bombay before and during the Bombay riots, which took place between December 1992 and January 1993 after the demolition of the Babri Masjid led to religious tensions between Hindu and Muslim communities
- Braveheart (1995 – epic historical drama film about Sir William Wallace, a late-13th century Scottish warrior who led the Scots in the First War of Scottish Independence against King Edward I of England
- Butterbox Babies (1995) – Canadian drama film based on the true story of the Ideal Maternity Home, a home for unwed pregnant mothers, during the Great Depression and Second World War
- Cafe Society (1995) – mystery drama film about New York society playboy Mickey Jelke who inherits a large sum of money and soon becomes embroiled in shadowy web of political exploitation and scandal in 1952, based on a true story covered in the national press
- Carrington (1995) – British biographical drama film about the life of the English painter Dora Carrington, who was known simply as "Carrington"
- Casino (1995) – epic crime drama film depicting the story of the alliance of Mafia mobsters Lefty Rosenthal and Tony Spilotro and their exploits working in Mafia controlled casinos in Las Vegas
- Catherine the Great (1995) – biographical drama television film based on the life of Catherine II of Russia
- Choices of the Heart: The Margaret Sanger Story (1995) – biographical drama television film about the controversial nurse Margaret Sanger who campaigned in the earlier decades of the 20th century in the United States for women's birth control
- Citizen X (1995) – biographical crime drama television film based upon the true story of Soviet serial killer Andrei Chikatilo, who was convicted in 1992 of the murder of 52 women and children committed between 1978 and 1990
- Dangerous Minds (1995) – biographical drama film about retired U.S. Marine LouAnne Johnson, who in 1989 took up a teaching position at Carlmont High School in Belmont, California, where most of her students were African-American and Latino teenagers from East Palo Alto, a racially segregated and economically deprived city
- Dead Man Walking (1995) – crime drama film about Sister Helen Prejean who establishes a special relationship with Matthew Poncelet, a character based on convicted murderers Elmo Patrick Sonnier and Robert Lee Willie
- Dead presidents (1995) – action crime drama film chronicling the life of Anthony Curtis, focusing on his teenage years as a high school graduate and his experiences during the Vietnam War as a Recon Marine
- Deadly Whispers (1995) – crime thriller television film depicting a father with dissociative identity disorder who murders his daughter, inspired by the murder of Kathy Bonney in 1987
- Death in Small Doses (1995) – crime drama television film dramatizing the 1991 death of wealthy Dallas resident Nancy Lyon by arsenic poisoning, a crime for which her husband Richard Lyon was the police's main suspect
- Deathmaker (German: Der Totmacher) (1995) – German crime drama film based on the transcripts of the interrogation of the notorious serial killer Fritz Haarmann
- England, My England (1995) – British historical drama film depicting the life of the composer Henry Purcell, seen through the eyes of a playwright in the 1960s who is trying to write a play about him
- Escape from Terror: The Teresa Stamper Story (1995) – crime drama television film based on the true story of Teresa Walden-Stamper
- Eskapo (1995) – Filipino historical thriller film about Sergio "Serge" Osmeña III and Eugenio "Geny" Lopez Jr. who were wrongly accused of plotting to assassinate President Ferdinand Marcos
- Falling from the Sky: Flight 174 (1995) – Canadian drama thriller film based on the events of Air Canada Flight 143
- Faustina (Polish: Faustyna) (1995) – Polish biographical drama film about Faustina Kowalska, a Roman Catholic nun and mystic whose apparitions of Jesus Christ inspired the Catholic devotion to the Divine Mercy
- The Flor Contemplacion Story (1995) – Filipino crime drama film about Flor Contemplacion, a Filipina domestic helper who was hanged in Singapore for allegedly killing her fellow maid
- The Great White Man of Lambaréné (French: Le grand blanc de Lambaréné) (1995) – Cameroonian-Gabonese-French biographical drama film about Albert Schweitzer, the Alsatian polymath
- Heat (1995) – crime drama film loosely based on Chicago police officer Chuck Adamson's pursuit of career criminal Neil McCauley in the 1960s
- Hiroshima (Japanese: 広島) (1995) – Japanese-Canadian war drama television film about the decision-making processes that led to the dropping of the atomic bombs by the United States on the Japanese cities of Hiroshima and Nagasaki toward the end of World War II
- Houses of Fire (Spanish: Casas de fuego) (1995) – Argentine historical biographical drama film following the life of Salvador Mazza, the Argentine physician who began investigating the Chagas disease in 1926 and over the years became the principal researcher in the country
- If Someone Had Known (1995) – crime drama television film about a young wife and mother who is abused by her husband but keeps it a secret from her friends and family, based on a true story
- Indictment: The McMartin Trial (1995) – thriller drama television film based on the true story of the McMartin preschool trial
- The Infiltrator (1995) – thriller drama television film about an Israeli freelance journalist who travels to Germany in the early 1990s and uncovers a dangerously pervasive underground Neo-Nazi faction with the intent to bring Nazism back to the forefront in Germany
- Jefferson in Paris (1995) – historical drama film about Thomas Jefferson's tenure as the Ambassador of the United States to France before his presidency and of his alleged relationships with Italian-English artist Maria Cosway and his slave, Sally Hemings
- Joseph (1995) – German-Italian-American Christian drama television film about the life of Joseph from the Old Testament
- Kathapurushan (Malayalam: കഥാപുരുഷൻ) (1995) – Indian-Japanese Malayalam-language historical drama film exploring the history of the state of Kerala in India
- Kidnapped (1995) – adventure drama television film set around real 18th-century Scottish events, notably the "Appin Murder", which occurred in the aftermath of the Jacobite rising of 1745
- Kidnapped: In the Line of Duty (1995) – thriller drama television film loosely based on a true story about an IRS official with access to detailed personal and financial data, who chose kidnap victims from the files
- Killer: A Journal of Murder (1995) – biographical crime drama film based on the life of American serial killer Carl Panzram, who was active in the early 20th century and executed in 1930
- Kingfish: A Story of Huey P. Long (1995) – biographical drama television film about Louisiana politician Huey Long, whose nickname was The Kingfish
- Les Milles (1995) – French war drama film about Germans, Jews, Communists or opponents of Nazism who had taken refuge in France, who were interned in the Camp des Milles, near Aix-en-Provence and get on a train to evacuate to Bayonne in May 1940, based on a true story about Charles Perrochon
- Liz: The Elizabeth Taylor Story (1995) – biographical drama television film chronicling the life of British-American actress Elizabeth Taylor
- Losing Isaiah (1995) – drama film about the biological and adoptive mothers of a young boy who are involved in a bitter, controversial custody battle
- Love and Betrayal: The Mia Farrow Story (1995) – biographical drama miniseries about Mia Farrow's relationship with Woody Allen
- Moses (1995) – Christian drama miniseries based on the biblical story of Moses, an Israelite raised by the Egyptian royal family, is chosen by God to release the Hebrew people from slavery and lead them to the Promised Land
- Murder in the First (1995) – legal drama film telling the alternate history of a petty criminal named Henri Young who is sent to Alcatraz Federal Penitentiary and later put on trial for murder in the first degree
- Naomi & Wynonna: Love Can Build a Bridge (1995) – biographical drama television film about the mother-daughter country music duo The Judds
- Neurosia: 50 Years of Perversity (German: Neurosia – 50 Jahre pervers) (1995) – German biographical comedy drama film depicting an ironic life review of Rosa von Praunheim based on a fictional story about his murder
- Nixon (1995) – epic historical drama film telling the story of the political and personal life of former U.S. President Richard Nixon
- The O. J. Simpson Story (1995) – biographical drama television film dramatizing some of the more tawdry events in the relationship between O. J. Simpson and his wife, Nicole Brown Simpson, up to and including his arrest for Brown's murder
- Operation Dumbo Drop (1995) – action war drama film about the Green Berets during the Vietnam War in 1968, who attempt to transport an elephant through jungle terrain to a local South Vietnamese village which in turn helps American forces monitor Viet Cong activity
- Panther (1995) – American-British drama film portraying the Black Panther Party for Self-Defense, tracing the organization from its founding through its decline in a compressed timeframe
- Pocahontas (1995) – animated family musical historical film based on the life of Powhatan woman Pocahontas and the arrival of English colonial settlers from the Virginia Company
- Pocahontas: The Legend (1995) – Canadian historical drama film fictionalizing the young life of the historical figure of Chief Powhatan's daughter Pocahontas and her relationship with Captain John Smith
- Policemen (Italian: Poliziotti) (1995) – Italian crime drama film based on a policeman who committed suicide while in jail
- Ravan Raaj: A True Story (Hindi: रावण राज एक सच्ची कहानी) (1995) – Indian Hindi-language action film based on a doctor's story, loosely based on the serial killer Auto Shankar
- Red Cherry (Mandarin: 紅櫻桃) (1995) – Chinese war drama film based on the true story of Chuchu (based on Zhu De's daughter Zhu Min), a 13-year-old Chinese girl, and Luo Xiaoman, a 12-year-old Chinese boy, who were sent to Moscow, Russia in the 1940s and enrolled into an international boarding school during World War Two
- Restoration (1995) – American-British biographical historical drama film about a 17th-century medical student exploited by King Charles II
- Rob Roy (1995) – historical biographical drama film about Rob Roy MacGregor, an 18th-century Scottish clan chief who battles a sadistic nobleman in the Scottish Highlands
- Savate (1995) – Western martial arts film based on the allegedly true story of the world's first kickboxer
- Serving in Silence: The Margarethe Cammermeyer Story (1995) – biographical drama television film recounting the events in the life of Colonel Margarethe Cammermeyer which led to her retirement from the Washington National Guard under the U.S. military's gay exclusion policy
- The Seventh Room (Hungarian: A hetedik szoba) (1995) – Hungarian biographical war drama film based on the life of Edith Stein
- She Fought Alone (1995) – drama television film about a girl who finds herself shamed in her small rural town after being raped, based on a true story
- Solomon & Sheba (1995) – Christian drama television film about the relationship between Queen Sheba and King Solomon
- Stonewall (1995) – British-American historical comedy drama film depicting a fictionalized account of the weeks leading up to the Stonewall riots, a seminal event in the modern American gay rights movement
- Tears of Stone (Icelandic: Tár úr steini) (1995) – Icelandic biographical drama film about the Icelandic composer Jón Leifs who spent much of his life in Germany before World War Two
- Total Eclipse (1995) – biographical romantic drama film presenting a historically accurate account of the passionate and violent relationship between 19th-century French poets Arthur Rimbaud and Paul Verlaine, at a time of soaring creativity for both men
- Truman (1995) – biographical drama television film centring on Harry S. Truman's humble beginnings, his rise to the presidency, World War II, and his decision to use the first atomic bomb
- The Tuskegee Airmen (1995) – biographical war television film based on the exploits of an actual groundbreaking unit, the first African-American combat pilots in the United States Army Air Corps, that fought in World War II
- Tyson (1995) – biographical sport drama television film based on the life of American heavyweight boxer Iron Mike Tyson
- Who Killed Pasolini? (Italian: Pasolini, un delitto italiano) (1995) – Italian-French crime drama film depicting the trial against Pino Pelosi, who was charged with the murder of artist and filmmaker Pier Paolo Pasolini
- Wild Bill (1995) – acid Western biographical drama film about the last days of legendary lawman Wild Bill Hickok
- The Young Poisoner's Handbook (1995) – black comedy crime drama film based on the life of Graham Young, more commonly known as "The Teacup Murderer"
