= Equator (disambiguation) =

An equator is the intersection of a sphere's surface with the plane perpendicular to the sphere's axis of rotation and midway between the poles. On Earth, the Equator, at 0° latitude, divides the Northern and Southern Hemispheres.

Equator may also refer to:

== Geography and astronomy ==
- Celestial equator
- Thermal equator
- Solar equator
- Chemical equator
- Equatorial bulge

== Film and television ==
- Équateur (film) (English: Equator), a 1983 French film directed by Serge Gainsbourg
- Equator (BBC TV series), a 2006 documentary series based on a journey along the equator
- Equator HD, a geography-themed television network that broadcasts in high-definition
- The Equator Man, a 2012 South Korean television series

== Literature and periodicals ==
- Equator (magazine), a London-based literary and political magazine founded in 2025
- The Equator (newspaper), a 19th-century black issues newspaper
- Following the Equator, an 1897 social commentary and travelogue by Mark Twain

== Music ==
- Equator Records, a Kenya-based record label active from 1960 to 1974
- Equator Records (Canada), a Canadian record label founded in 2006

Albums

- Equator (Randy Stonehill album), 1983
- Equator (Uriah Heep album), 1985

Songs

- "Equator", a song by Sparks from their 1974 album Kimono My House

== Transportation ==
=== Air transportation ===
- Air Equator, a former airline based in Gan, Maldives

=== Automobiles ===
- Ford Equator, the name of three different vehicles:
  - Ford Equator (2000 concept), a 2000 American mid-size pickup concept
  - Ford Equator (2005 concept), a 2005 American compact SUV concept based on the Ford Escape
  - Ford Equator, a 2021–present Chinese mid-size SUV produced by Jiangling Motors
- Suzuki Equator, a 2008–2012 American mid-size pickup truck

=== Watercraft ===
- Equator (schooner), an 1888 two-masted pygmy trading schooner
- MV Equator (1939), a Soviet cargo liner

== Others ==
- Equator IRC, an Interdisciplinary Research Collaboration focused on experiences integrating physical and digital interactions
- EQUATOR (Enhancing the QUAlity and Transparency Of health Research), an international health research quality initiative
- Equator Principles, a business risk management framework
- Equator Prize, a UN award recognizing efforts to reduce poverty through conservation
- Equator crossing ceremony, a traditional naval initiation rite

== See also ==
- Équateur (disambiguation)
- Province of Équateur, a province of the Democratic Republic of the Congo
  - Équateur (former province), a former province of the Democratic Republic of the Congo
    - Équateur District, a district of the Democratic Republic of the Congo
- Équateur (film), a 1983 French film
- Ecuador (disambiguation)
