= List of Gabonese films =

== A ==
- Ayouma (1978)

== B ==
- Boxing Libreville (2018)

== C ==
- Cage, La (1963)
- Carte postale sur Port-Gentil (1979)
- Cours toujours, tu m'intéresse (2003)

== D ==
- Damier, Le (1996)
- Demain un jour nouveau (1979)
- Divorce, Le (2008)
- Djogo (2002)
- După-amiaza unui torționar (2001). Directed by Lucian Pintilie.
- Dôlé (2000)

== E ==
- Équateur (1983)
- Erable et l'okoumé, L' (1983)

== G ==
- Grand blanc de Lambaréné, Le (1995)

== I ==
- Identité (1972)
- Il était une fois Libreville (1972)
- Ilombe (1979)

== L ==
- Le silence de la forêt (2003)

== O ==
- O'Bali (1977)
- Okoumé bois national'' (1980)
- Où vas-tu, Koumba? (1971)

== P ==
- Profile de l'Ogooue maritime (1982)

== R ==
- The Rhythm Of My Life: Ismael Sankara (2011)

== T ==
- Tam tams se sont tus, Les (1972)
- Terres d'or, Les (1925)
