= IGIS =

IGIS may refer to:

- IGIS Asset Management, South Korea
- Inspector-General of Intelligence and Security, in Australia and New Zealand
- Institut Gabonais de l'Image et du Son (Gabonese Institute of Image and Sound), see Cinema of Gabon
- Institute of Geographical Information Systems, Pakistan

== See also ==
- Igis, a village in Switzerland
