= Tropical rain belt =

Area of active rain around the tropics

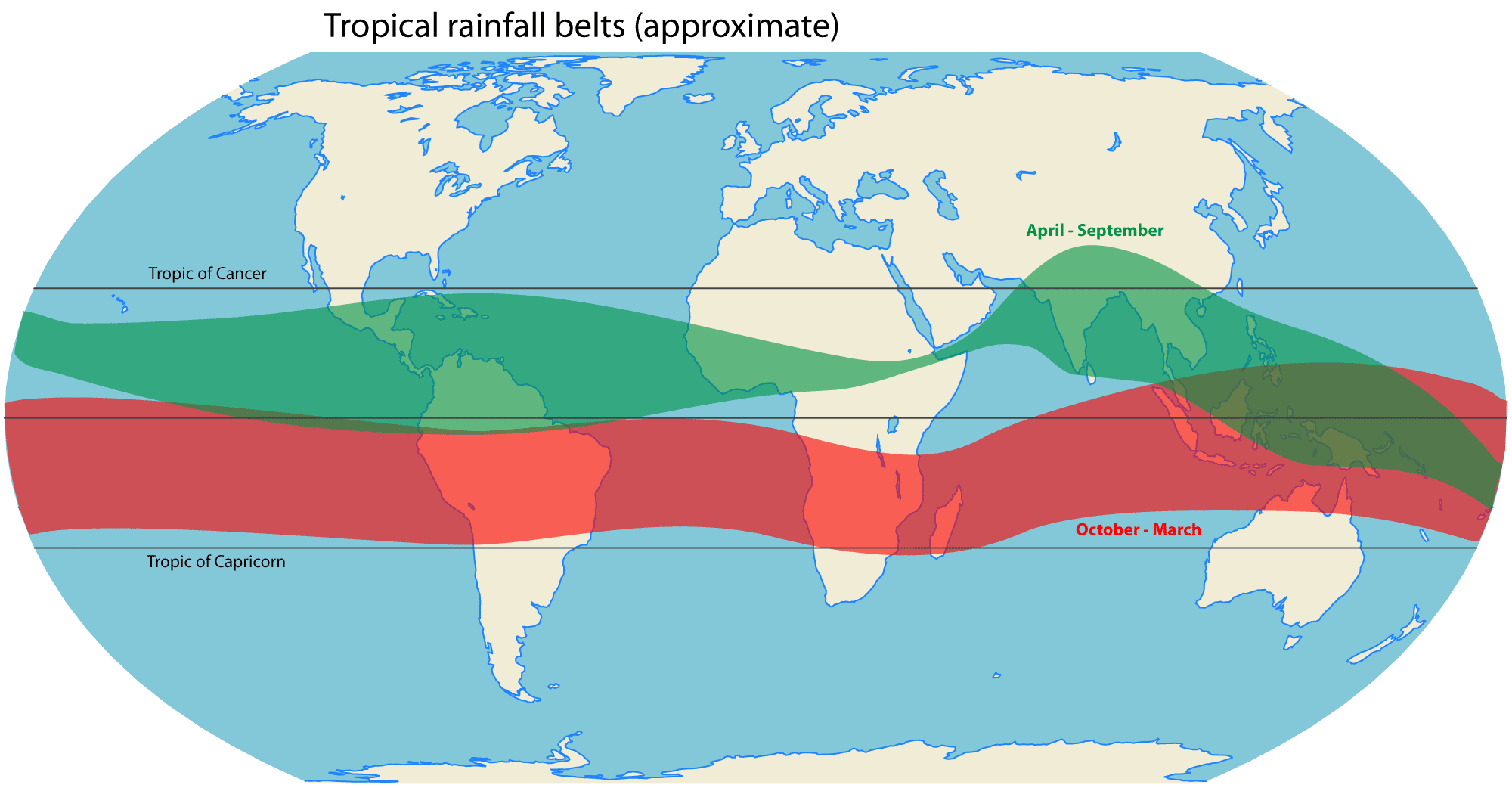
Map showing approximate location of tropical rain belt

Rainfall and the tropical climate dominate the tropical rain belt, which oscillates from the northern to the southern tropics over the course of the year, roughly following the solar equator. The tropical rain belt is an area of active rain that is positioned mostly around the tropics.

== Mechanism ==
The reason the rain belt is situated near the tropics can be attributed to the fact that the Sun's radiation is strongest near the equator, which is located in the middle of the tropics. This solar radiation generates large amounts of heat near the equator. This causes the air at ground level to warm up. Because hot air is less dense than cold air, the hot air rises into the upper levels of the atmosphere, cooling as it rises. However, cooler air cannot hold as much moisture as hot air, so when the air rises and cools, its water condenses, forming clouds which cause rain in the form of thunderstorms and rain showers.

== Location ==
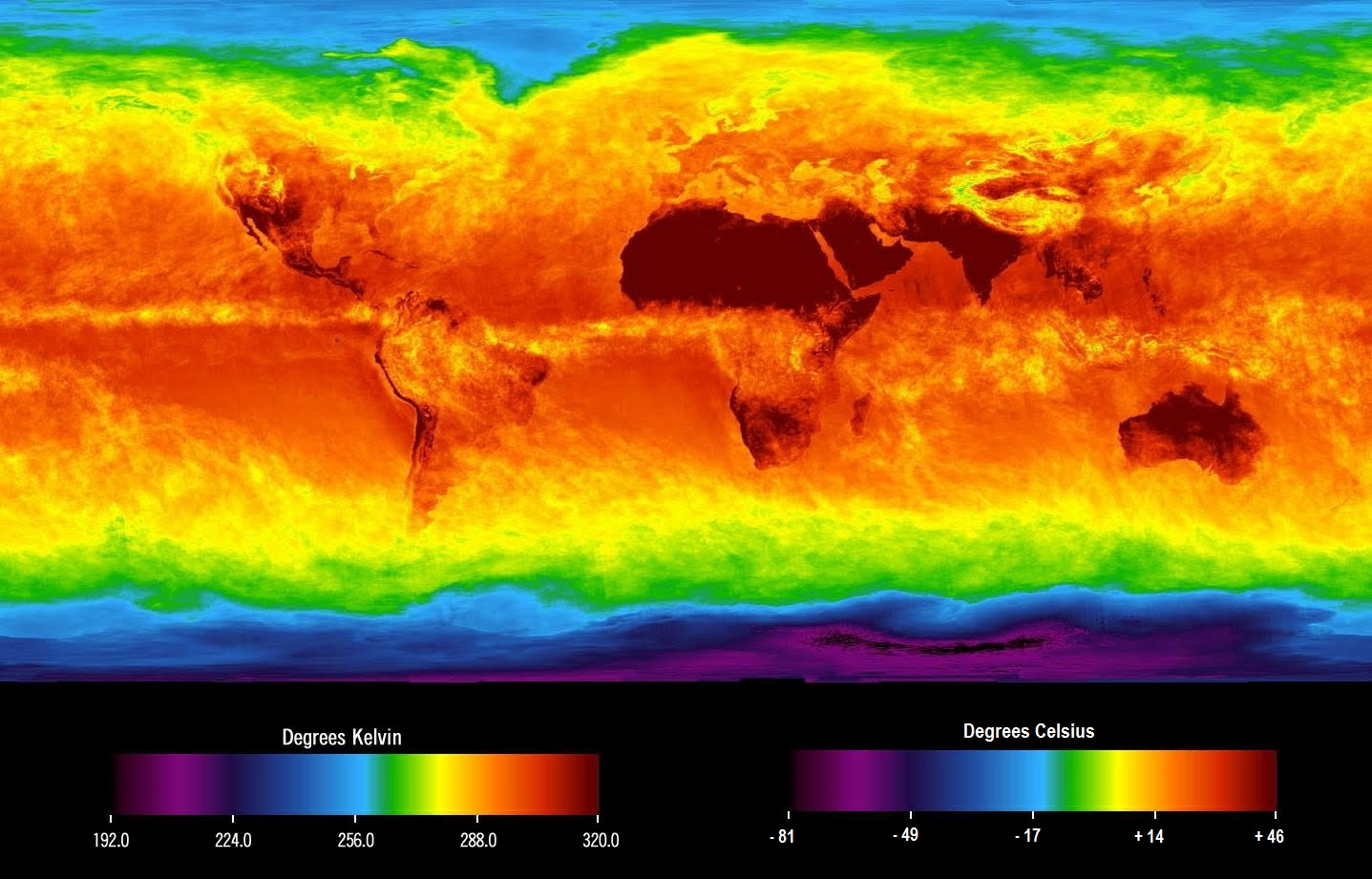
Infrared map roughly showing the location of the tropical rain belt

The tropical rain belt is located along the equator and extend out to the Tropic of Cancer, which is the 23.5 north latitude, as well as the Tropic of Capricorn, which is the 23.5 south latitude. It moves north in the Northern Hemisphere summer and south in the Northern Hemisphere winter, following the thermal equator where temperatures are highest at each point in the year. It is a manifestation of the Intertropical Convergence Zone.

The tropical rain belt lies in the Southern Hemisphere of the Indian Ocean and western Pacific Ocean roughly from October to March, and during this time the northern tropics experience a dry season in which precipitation is very rare and days are typically hot and sunny throughout. From April to September, the rain belt lies in the Northern Hemisphere, and a wet season occurs there, while the southern tropics experience a dry season.

The rain belt reaches roughly as far north as the Tropic of Cancer and as far south as the Tropic of Capricorn in the western Pacific Ocean. Its variation in the Western Hemisphere is minimal, roughly between the equator and the 15th parallel north latitude. Near these latitudes, there is one wet season and one dry season annually. On the equator, there are two wet and two dry seasons as the rain belt passes over twice a year, one moving north and one moving south. Between the tropics and the equator, locations may experience both a short wet and a long wet season. Local geography may substantially modify these climate patterns.

== Effects of climate change ==
As Earth warms, the rain belt is projected to move north of the current position. Although the Earth is warming as a whole entity, the Northern Hemisphere is warming faster than the Southern because of melting Arctic sea ice. As the Northern Hemisphere warms, a temperature gradient is established between the Northern and Southern hemispheres. The warmer temperatures in the northern tropics foster an environment more conducive to the development of moisture. The additional moisture is met with a low-level atmosphere that is cooler because the warm air has risen to the higher levels of the atmosphere. This scenario leads to increased precipitation and is a fundament behind the idea that the rain belt is moving north. The contrast in temperature is only a part of the entire process that is driving the tropical rain belt northward.

Another factor that influences the tropical rain belt is ocean circulation. Ocean overturning circulation is a process that involves ocean circulation between the Antarctic and Arctic. Dargan Frierson explains that in this process the Northern Hemisphere receives more heat than the Southern Hemisphere because the overturning circulation brings more heat into the Northern Hemisphere as opposed to the Southern. He also states that as a result, the extra heat is transferred to the tropical regions in the Northern Hemisphere, causing warm ocean water to be situated in the northern tropics. This warm ocean water is what eventually generates rain and thunderstorms, and because there is more warm water in the northern tropics, it is apparent that the tropical rain belt is moving northward. Due to global climate change, the circulation of ocean currents and ocean temperatures might adjust in favor of pushing the belt further north into the region of oscillation.

However, there is also the possibility that climate change will slow down ocean currents and circulation, which can change the present-day dynamic and send the rain belt to the south. Therefore, ocean circulation, ocean temperature, and the temperature of Earth are all attributing to the movement of the tropical rain belt. It is evident that the trend is northward, and the belt is currently situated in the northern tropics, but the possibility of southward movement does exist.

The tropical regions will be affected most by the northward movement of the rain. The banana and coffee crops in Guatemala and Indonesia would be compromised by the loss of precipitation. In addition, the effects of a drier climate in Mexico could push the Mexican desert into southern portions of Texas, New Mexico and other areas in the southern U.S. Areas in the Middle East, Western America, and the Amazon rainforest risk the possibility of becoming drier and less humid. In contrast, the northward trend could bring more rain to areas in Asia already exposed to monsoons. An increase of moisture in monsoon prone areas could be catastrophic as massive floods could follow the large amounts of rain added to current monsoons.

Using geographical information, it is possible that the northward movement of the rain belt is already evident because of droughts in the western U.S., Syria and northern China. Although the possible adversarial effects of the movement can be devastating, the northward movement of the rain belt could bring an increase of rain to areas that have been decimated by droughts, which could prove to be very beneficial.
