= Nadège Beausson-Diagne =

French actress, singer and columnist

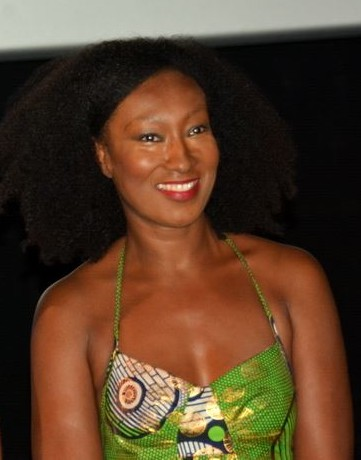
- Born: 18 June 1972 (age 53); Paris, France
- Occupations: Actress, Singer
- Years active: 1993–present

Nadège Beausson-Diagne (born 18 June 1972 in Paris) is a French actress, singer and columnist. She is mainly known for having played the police chief Sara Douala in the television series Plus belle la vie. She also appeared in successful films such as Podium by Yann Moix and Nothing to Declare [Rien à déclarer] by Dany Boon.

== Early life ==
Beausson-Diagne was born in France to a Senegalese father and a mother of Ivorian and Breton descent.

== Career ==
Beausson-Diagne made her first film appearance in 2004, playing one of Benoit Poelvooirde’s four “Bernadettes” in Podium. She continued acting, appearing in various feature films such as Agathe Cléry directed by Valérie Lemercier, with whom she would later work in Marie-Francine, and in Nothing to Declare by Dany Boon, who had previously directed her in Bienvenue chez les Ch'tis.

From 2010 to 2014, she played the role of Commissioner Sara Douala in the soap opera Plus belle la vie. When her departure from the show was announced, a petition was circulated by her fans demanding that she be kept on.

In 2014, the Bausson-Diagne decided to join the Pep's series where she played the role of Catherine Paillard, the director of Victor Hugo College. The same year, she became a columnist in the program Touche pas à mon poste! before leaving the program in 2016. She then joined Bruno de Stabenrath with whom she co-presented Faut pas pousser on the channel Numéro 23.

In 2017, she appeared in the video for the single "On est là" by the rapper Féfé, playing the role of a concert manager. However, she continued her acting career, playing in Ôtez-moi d'un doute, a comedy that won an award at the Cannes Film Festival, and Brillantissime, Michèle Laroque's first film.

== Theater ==
Year	Title	Author	Director
2000	Monsieur Amédée	Alain Reynaud-Fourton	Jean-Pierre Dravel
2006	Le Bourgeois gentilhomme	Molière	Alain Sachs
2008	Open Bed	David Serrano	Charlotte de Turckheim
2011-12	Oscar	Claude Magnier	Éric Civanyan

== Filmography ==
Year	Title	Role	Director	Notes
1993	Night of Vampyrmania		Richard J. Thomson	
1997	Alliance cherche doigt	The Caribbean	Jean-Pierre Mocky	
1997	Saraka bô		Denis Amar	
1998-99	Commissaire Moulin		Yves Rénier & Denis Amar (2)	TV series (2 episodes)
2000	Un gars, une fille		Francis Duquet	TV series (1 episode)
2000	Le g.R.E.C.		Fred Béraud-Dufour & Pat Le Guen-Tenot	TV series (2 episodes)
2001	Sa mère, la pute	The black coach	Brigitte Roüan	TV movie
2002	Jet Lag	Roissy Passenger	Danièle Thompson	
2002	Djogo	Wissi	Henri-Joseph Koumba Bididi	
2002	Vivre me tue		Jean-Pierre Sinapi	
2002	La chair est triste	The Woman	Jérémie Nassif	Short
2002	La vie devant nous		Alain Choquart	TV series (1 episode)
2003	Les baigneuses	Rita	Viviane Candas	
2003	Le silence de la forêt	Simone	Bassek Ba Kobhio & Didier Ouenangare	
2004	Podium	Nadège	Yann Moix	
2004	Courrier du coeur	Stéphanie	Christian Faure	TV movie
2004	Coup de vache	The Cop	Lou Jeunet	TV movie
2005	Les hommes de coeur	Karine	Édouard Molinaro	TV series (1 episode)
2005	Inspector Sori	Sali	Mamady Sidibé	TV series (1 episode)
2005	Groupe flag	The mistress	Étienne Dhaene	TV series (1 episode)
2005	P.J.	Tina	Gérard Vergez & Christophe Barbier	TV series (9 episodes)
2006	Madame Irma	Sylvie	Didier Bourdon & Yves Fajnberge	
2006	Suzanne	The Singer	Viviane Candas (2)	
2006	Commissaire Cordier	Véronique	Christophe Douchand	TV series (1 episode)
2006	Équipe médicale d'urgence		Étienne Dhaene (2)	TV series (1 episode)
2007	Julie Lescaut	Victoire Saint-Gilles	Daniel Janneau	TV series (4 episodes)
2008	Agathe Cléry	Nathalie	Étienne Chatiliez	
2008	Bienvenue chez les Ch'tis	The employee	Dany Boon	
2008	Comme les autres	The midwife	Vincent Garenq	
2009	Otages	The counsel	Didier Albert	TV movie
2009	Action spéciale douanes	Zazie	Patrick Jamain & Alain Rudaz	TV series (6 episodes)
2010	Film Socialisme	Constance	Jean-Luc Godard	
2010	Nothing to Declare	Nadia Bakari	Dany Boon (2)	
2010	Enquêtes réservées	Rebecca	Bruno Garcia	TV series (1 episode)
2010-13	Plus belle la vie	Sara Douala	Several	TV series (115 episodes)
2011	Course contre la montre	Sara Douala	Roger Wielgus	TV movie
2012	True love	Lisa	Joseph Cahill	TV movie
2012	Nom de code : Rose	Sandrine Duval	Arnauld Mercadier	TV movie
2013	Pauvre Richard !	Josephine	Malik Chibane	
2014	Family Show	Marie-Aimée Clément	Pascal Lahmani	TV movie
2015	Cherif	Nathalie Roussel	Julien Zidi	TV series (1 episode)
2015	Pep's	Madame Paillard	Jonathan Barré	TV series (1 episode)
2016	Le petit locataire	Jackie	Nadège Loiseau	
2016	La promesse du feu	Press Officer	Christian Faure (2)	TV movie
2017	Marie-Francine	Nadège	Valérie Lemercier	
2018	Brillantissime		Michèle Laroque	
2019	Meurtre à Cayenne	Cassandra Molba	Marc Barrat	TV series (1 episode)
2022	Three Times Nothing (Trois fois rien)		Nadège Loiseau	

=== Television ===
Since 2015, she has been a columnist on TV show Touche pas à mon poste!.

== Activism ==
In September 2018 she was invited to the Summer University of Feminism organized by Marlène Schiappa in Paris.

During the 2018 Cannes Film Festival, she walked the red carpet alongside fifteen other actresses to denounce the under-representation of black and mixed-race French women as well as racist clichés in French cinema. "Fortunately you have fine features", "Do you speak African?", "Too black to play the role of a Métis", "Not African enough for an African"; are comments Beausson-Diagne has heard throughout her life.

In March 2019, she revealed that she had been a victim of sexual assault: "I too have been sexually harassed and sexually assaulted on two film shoots in Africa. That was a very long time ago. The pain was swallowed up. Today I am ready to speak out to help liberate this word and recover my life". She is a member of the 50/50 collective which aims to promote gender equality and the diversity in the cinema and audiovisual sector.
