= Djogo =

2002 Gabonese comedy film

- Directed by: Henri-Joseph Koumba Bididi
- Written by: Jean-Michel Isabel; Henri-Joseph Koumba Bididi; Pauline Sales
- Produced by: Charles Mensah
- Starring: Jean-Claude M'Paka; Philippe Mory; Malcolm Conrath; Annette Ayeang; Nadège Beausson-Diagne
- Cinematography: Philippe Elusse
- Edited by: Michel Klochendler
- Music by: Wasis Diop
- Production companies: Adélaïde Productions; Ce.Na.Ci. Terre Africaine
- Distributed by: Swift Distribution
- Release date: 13 February 2002; (France)
- Running time: 98 minutes
- Countries: Gabon; France
- Language: French

Djogo (officially as Les couilles de l'éléphant), is a 2002 Gabonese comedy film directed by Henri-Joseph Koumba Bididi and produced by Charles Mensah. The film stars Jean-Claude M'Paka in the lead role whereas Philippe Mory, Malcolm Conrath, Annette Ayeang and Nadège Beausson-Diagne made supportive roles.

The film made its premier on 13 February 2002 in France. The film received mixed reviews from critics and screened in many film festivals worldwide. In 2001 at the Panafrican Film and Television Festival of Ouagadougou, the composer of the film, Wasis Diop won the Best Music Award.

== Plot ==
The film revolves around Alevina, a well-known politician who started his electoral campaign but his daughter joined up with his opponents.

== Cast ==
- Jean-Claude M'Paka as Alevina
- Philippe Mory as Kouka
- Malcolm Conrath as Leclerc
- Annette Ayeang as Madame Alevina
- Nadège Beausson-Diagne as Wissi
- Serge Abessolo as Kinga
- Dominique Diata as Georges
- Viviane Biviga as Safou
- Marie-Françoise Mimbie as La sorcière
- Afthanase Ngou as Le porte-serviette
