= Ecuador (disambiguation) =

Ecuador is a country in South America whose name comes from the Spanish word for the equator.

Ecuador or Equador may also refer to:

- "Ecuador" (song), by German DJ/Production team Sash! and featuring Adrian Rodriguez
- Ecuador metro station in Santiago, Chile
- Volcán Ecuador, a volcano of the Galápagos Islands in the Pacific Ocean
- Confederação do Equador, a short-lived separatist state in Brazil
- Equador, Rio Grande do Norte, a Brazilian city

== See also ==
- Equator (disambiguation)
