= Intertropical Convergence Zone =

Meteorological phenomenon

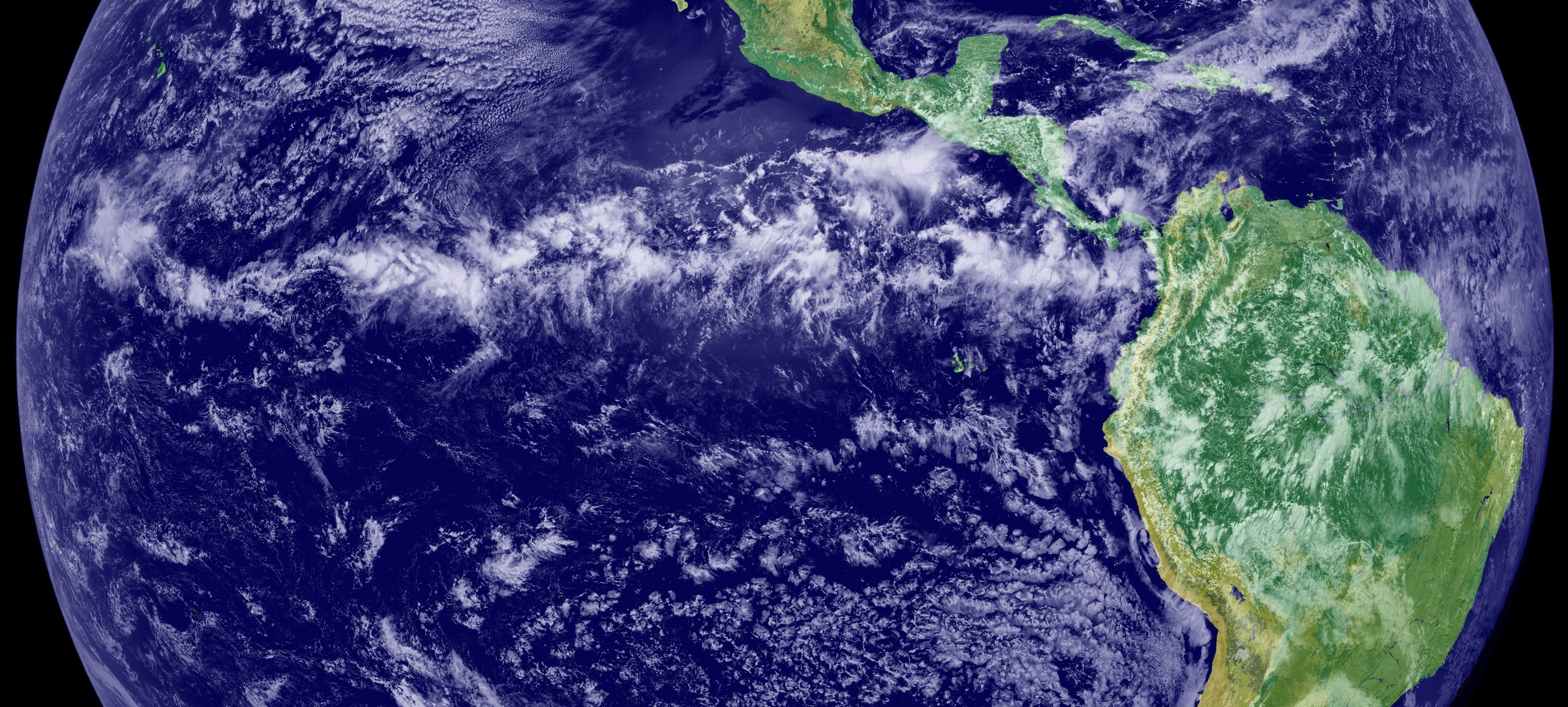
The ITCZ is visible as a band of clouds encircling Earth near the Equator.

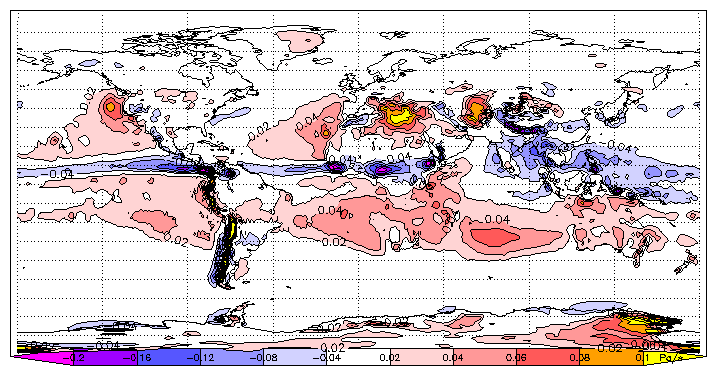
Average vertical air velocity at 500 hPa in July. Ascent (negative values) is concentrated close to the solar equator; descent (positive values) is more diffuse

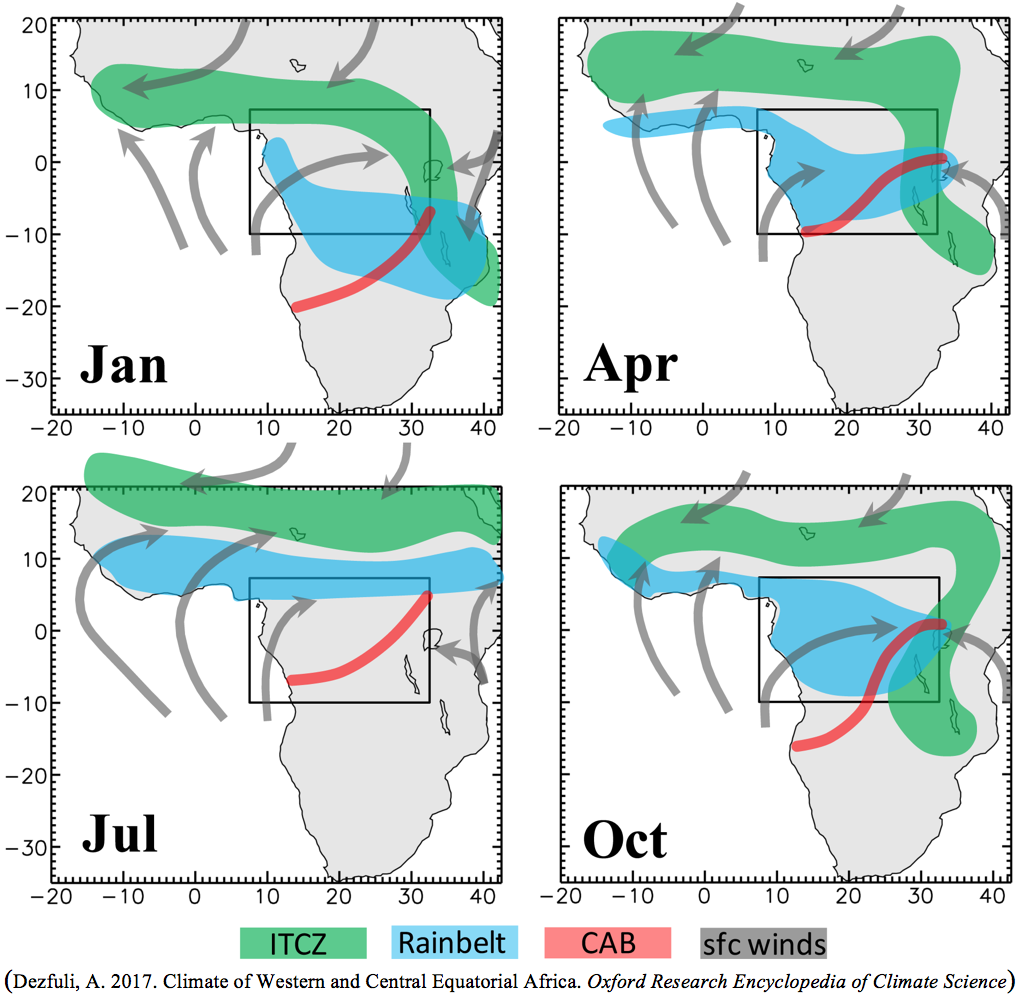
Seasonal variability of the Intertropical Convergence Zone (ITCZ), Congo air boundary (CAB), tropical rainbelt, and surface winds over Africa (adapted from Dezfuli 2017 with modification). This schematic shows that the ITCZ and the region of maximum rainfall can be decoupled over the continents.

The Intertropical Convergence Zone (ITCZ /ɪtʃ/ ITCH, or ICZ), known by sailors as the doldrums or the calms because of its monotonous windless weather, is the area where the northeast and the southeast trade winds converge. It encircles Earth near the thermal equator, though its specific position varies seasonally. When it lies near the geographic equator, it is called the near-equatorial trough. Where the ITCZ is drawn into and merges with a monsoonal circulation, it is sometimes referred to as a monsoon trough (a usage that is more common in Australia and parts of Asia).

== Meteorology ==
The ITCZ was originally identified from the 1920s to the 1940s as the Intertropical Front (ITF); however, after the recognition of the significance of wind field convergence in tropical weather production in the 1940s and 1950s, the term Intertropical Convergence Zone (ITCZ) was then applied.

The ITCZ appears as a band of clouds, typically thunderstorms, that encircle the globe near the Equator. In the Northern Hemisphere, the trade winds move in a southwestward direction from the northeast, while in the Southern Hemisphere, they move northwestward from the southeast. When the ITCZ is positioned north or south of the Equator, these directions change according to the Coriolis effect imparted by Earth's rotation. For instance, when the ITCZ is situated north of the Equator, the southeast trade wind changes to a southwest wind as it crosses the Equator. The ITCZ is formed by vertical motion largely appearing as convective activity of thunderstorms driven by solar heating, which effectively draw air in; these are the trade winds. The ITCZ is effectively a tracer of the ascending branch of the Hadley cell and is wet. The dry descending branch is the horse latitudes.

The location of the ITCZ gradually varies with the seasons, roughly corresponding with the location of the thermal equator. As the heat capacity of the oceans is greater than air over land, migration is more prominent over land. Over the oceans, where the convergence zone is better defined, the seasonal cycle is more subtle, as the convection is constrained by the distribution of ocean temperatures. Sometimes, a double ITCZ forms, with one located north and another south of the Equator, one of which is usually stronger than the other. When this occurs, a narrow ridge of high pressure forms between the two convergence zones.

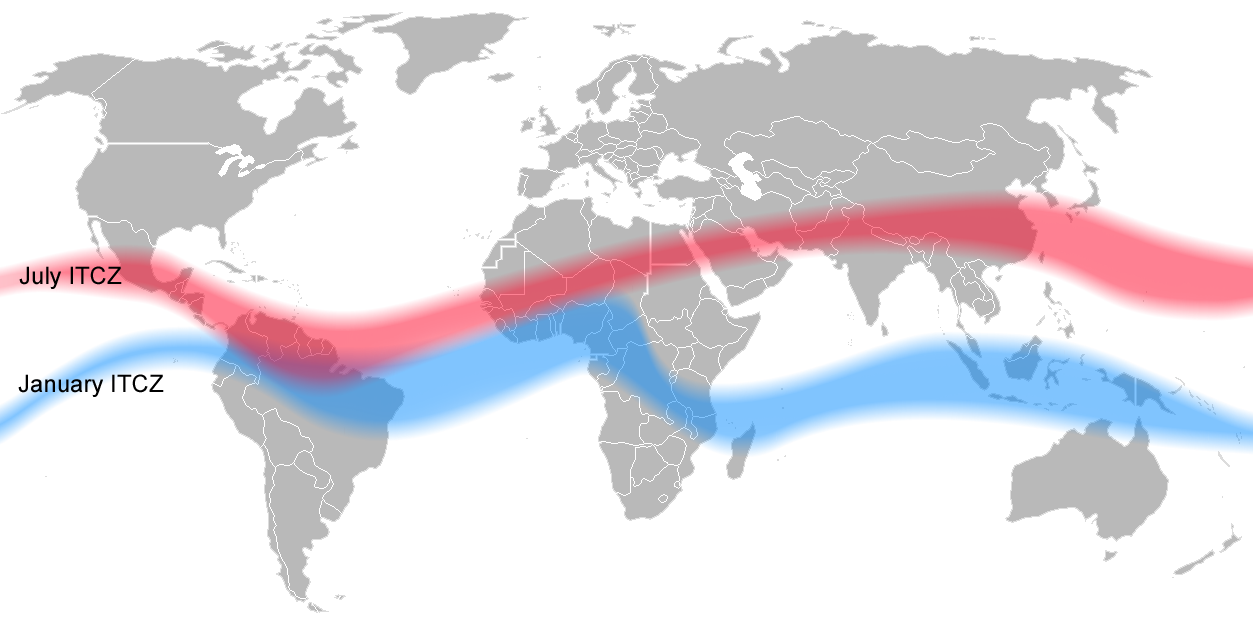
The ITCZ moves farther away from the equator during the Northern summer than the Southern one due to the North-heavy arrangement of the continents.

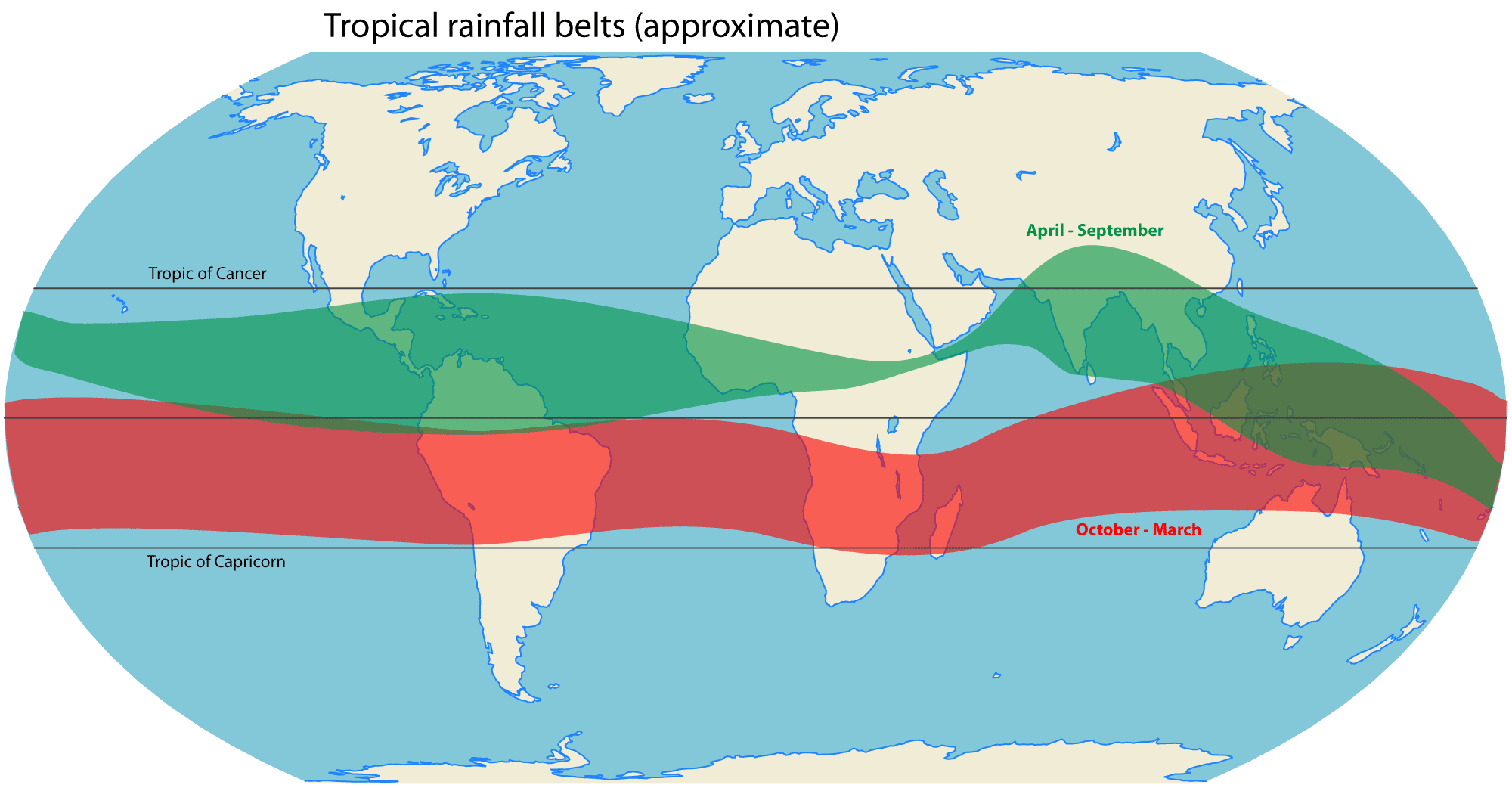
Approximate location of tropical rain belt in Northern summer (green) and Southern summer (red)

== ITCZ over oceans vs. land ==
The ITCZ is commonly defined as an equatorial zone where the trade winds converge. Rainfall seasonality is traditionally attributed to the north–south migration of the ITCZ, which follows the sun. Although this is largely valid over the equatorial oceans, the ITCZ and the region of maximum rainfall can be decoupled over the continents. The equatorial precipitation over land is not simply a response to just the surface convergence. Rather, it is modulated by a number of regional features such as local atmospheric jets and waves, proximity to the oceans, terrain-induced convective systems, moisture recycling, and spatiotemporal variability of land cover and albedo.

== South Pacific convergence zone ==
The South Pacific convergence zone (SPCZ) is a reverse-oriented, or west-northwest to east-southeast aligned, trough extending from the west Pacific warm pool southeastwards towards French Polynesia. It lies just south of the equator during the Southern Hemisphere warm season, but can be more extratropical in nature, especially east of the International Date Line. It is considered the largest and most important piece of the ITCZ, and has the least dependence upon heating from a nearby land mass during the summer than any other portion of the monsoon trough. The southern ITCZ in the eastern tropical Pacific and southern tropical Atlantic, known as the SITCZ, occurs during the Southern Hemisphere fall between 3° and 10° south of the equator east of the 140th meridian west longitude during cool or neutral El Niño–Southern Oscillation (ENSO) patterns. When ENSO reaches its warm phase, otherwise known as El Niño, the tongue of lowered sea surface temperatures due to upwelling off the South American continent disappears, which causes this convergence zone to vanish as well.

== Effects on weather ==
Variation in the location of the intertropical convergence zone drastically affects rainfall in many equatorial nations, resulting in the wet and dry seasons of the tropics rather than the cold and warm seasons of higher latitudes. Longer term changes in the intertropical convergence zone can result in severe droughts or flooding in nearby areas.

In some cases, the ITCZ may become narrow, especially when it moves away from the equator; the ITCZ can then be interpreted as a front along the leading edge of the equatorial air. There appears to be a 15 to 25-day cycle in thunderstorm activity along the ITCZ, which is roughly half the wavelength of the Madden–Julian oscillation (MJO).

Within the ITCZ the average winds are slight, unlike the zones north and south of the equator where the trade winds feed. As trans-equator sea voyages became more common, sailors in the eighteenth century named this belt of calm the doldrums because of the calm, stagnant, or inactive winds.

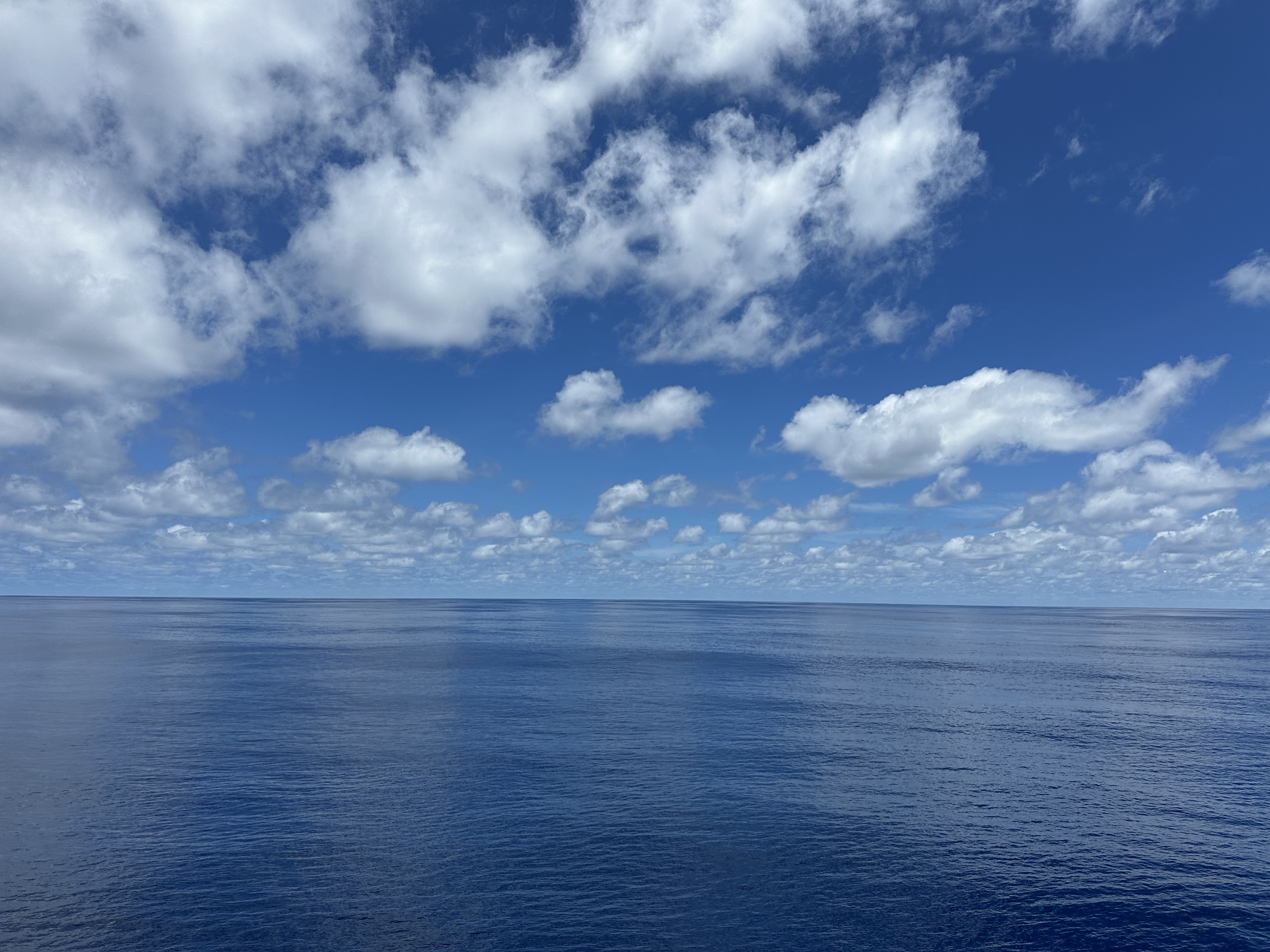
The "doldrums" is a popular nautical term that refers to the belt around the Earth near the equator where sailing ships sometimes get stuck on windless waters.

== Role in tropical cyclone formation ==
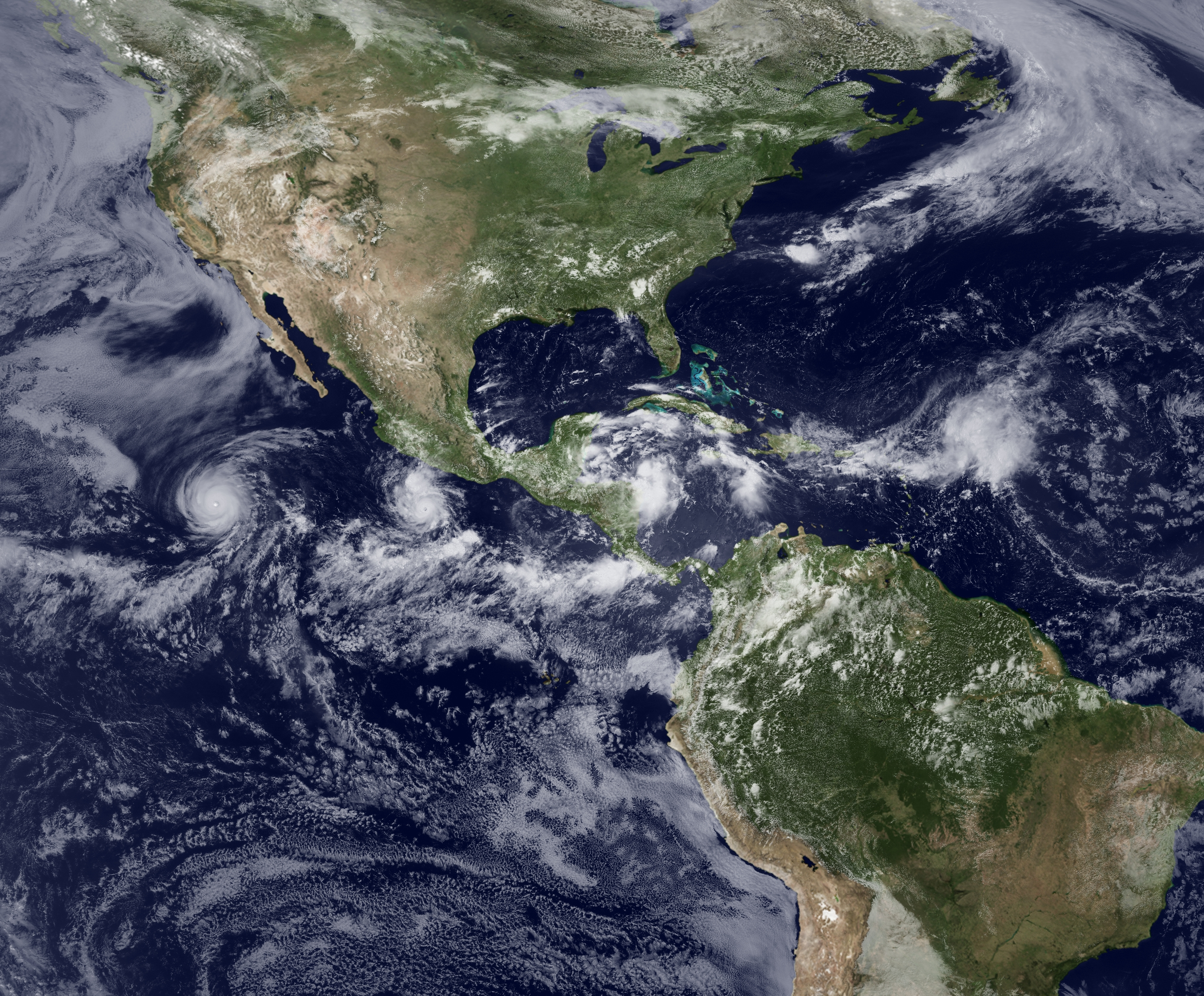
Hurricanes Celia and Darby in the eastern Pacific and the precursor to Hurricane Alex in the Intertropical Convergence Zone. (2010)

Tropical cyclogenesis depends upon low-level vorticity as one of its six requirements, and the ITCZ fills this role as it is a zone of wind change and speed, otherwise known as horizontal wind shear. As the ITCZ migrates to tropical and subtropical latitudes and even beyond during the respective hemisphere's summer season, increasing Coriolis force makes the formation of tropical cyclones within this zone more possible. Surges of higher pressure from high latitudes can enhance tropical disturbances along its axis. In the tropical north Atlantic and the eastern portion of the tropical north Pacific oceans, tropical waves move along the axis of the ITCZ causing an increase in thunderstorm activity, and clusters of thunderstorms can develop under weak vertical wind shear.

== Hazards ==
In the Age of Sail, to find oneself becalmed in this region in a hot and muggy climate could mean death when wind was the only effective way to propel ships across the ocean. Calm periods within the doldrums could strand ships for days or weeks. Even today, leisure and competitive sailors attempt to cross the zone as quickly as possible as the erratic weather and wind patterns may cause unexpected delays.

In 2009, thunderstorms along the Intertropical Convergence Zone played a role in the loss of Air France Flight 447, which crashed while flying from Rio de Janeiro–Galeão International Airport to Charles de Gaulle Airport near Paris. The aircraft crashed with no survivors while flying through a series of large ITCZ thunderstorms, and ice forming rapidly on airspeed sensors was the precipitating cause for a cascade of human errors which ultimately doomed the flight. Most aircraft flying these routes are able to avoid the larger convective cells without incident.

== Effects of climate change ==
Titanium concentrations in sediment within the Cariaco Basin have been used as a paleoclimate proxy to infer shifts in the ITCZ.

Based on paleoclimate proxies, the position and intensity of the ITCZ varied in prehistoric times along with changes in global climate. During Heinrich events within the last 100 ka, a southward shift of the ITCZ coincided with the intensification of the Northern Hemisphere Hadley cell coincident with weakening of the Southern Hemisphere Hadley cell. The ITCZ shifted north during the mid-Holocene but migrated south following changes in insolation during the late-Holocene towards its current position. The ITCZ has also undergone periods of contraction and expansion within the last millennium. A southward shift of the ITCZ commencing after the 1950s and continuing into the 1980s may have been associated with cooling induced by aerosols in the Northern Hemisphere based on results from climate models; a northward rebound began subsequently following forced changes in the gradient in temperature between the Northern and Southern hemispheres. These fluctuations in ITCZ positioning had robust effects on climate; for instance, displacement of the ITCZ may have led to drought in the Sahel in the 1980s.

Atmospheric convection may become stronger and more concentrated at the center of the ITCZ in response to a globally warming climate, resulting in sharpened contrasts in precipitation between the ITCZ core (where precipitation would be amplified) and its edges (where precipitation would be suppressed). Atmospheric reanalyses suggest that the ITCZ over the Pacific has narrowed and intensified since at least 1979, in agreement with data collected by satellites and in-situ precipitation measurements. The drier ITCZ fringes are also associated with an increase in outgoing longwave radiation outward of those areas, particularly over land within the mid-latitudes and the subtropics. This change in the ITCZ is also reflected by increasing salinity within the Atlantic and Pacific underlying the ITCZ fringes and decreasing salinity underlying central belt of the ITCZ. The IPCC Sixth Assessment Report indicated "medium agreement" from studies regarding the strengthening and tightening of the ITCZ due to anthropogenic climate change.

Less certain are the regional and global shifts in ITCZ position as a result of climate change, with paleoclimate data and model simulations highlighting contrasts stemming from asymmetries in forcing from aerosols, volcanic activity, and orbital variations, as well as uncertainties associated with changes in monsoons and the Atlantic meridional overturning circulation. The climate simulations run as part of Coupled Model Intercomparison Project Phase 5 (CMIP5) did not show a consistent global displacement of the ITCZ under anthropogenic climate change. In contrast, most of the same simulations show narrowing and intensification under the same prescribed conditions. However, simulations in Coupled Model Intercomparison Project Phase 6 (CMIP6) have shown greater agreement over some regional shifts of the ITCZ in response to anthropogenic climate change, including a northward displacement over the Indian Ocean and eastern Africa and a southward displacement over the eastern Pacific and Atlantic oceans.

== In literature ==
The doldrums are notably described in Samuel Taylor Coleridge's poem The Rime of the Ancient Mariner (1798) and also provide a metaphor for the initial state of boredom and indifference of Milo, the child hero of Norton Juster's classic 1961 children's novel The Phantom Tollbooth. It is also cited in the 1939 book Wind, Sand and Stars.

== See also ==
- Asymmetry of the Intertropical Convergence Zone
- Chemical equator
- Monsoon trough
- Horse latitudes
- Polar front
- Roaring Forties
