= Adela (2000 film) =

- Directed by: Eduardo Mignogna
- Written by: Eduardo Mignogna; François-Olivier Rousseau
- Based on: Le Coup de lune by Georges Simenon
- Produced by: Eduardo Mignogna
- Starring: Eulalia Ramón; Grégoire Colin
- Release date: 2000
- Running time: 103 minute
- Countries: Argentina; Spain
- Language: Spanish

Adela is a 2000 Argentine thriller film directed and written by Eduardo Mignogna. The film was based on the novel Le Coup de lune by Georges Simenon, adapted by François-Olivier Rousseau. The film starred Eulalia Ramón and Grégoire Colin.

== Plot ==
Bolivia, 1945. Two murders have been committed in Hotel Central, the inhospitable meeting point of the mixture of indigenous, Creole and European people who live in San Jacinto, a city of despair. Adela, the attractive owner's wife, blames Maria, one of the servants. But Timar, a young traveler, finds out some information that suggests a very different truth. In an oppressive atmosphere, where escaping seems to be the only thing that matters, Timar will struggle between his feelings for Adela and the injustice of convicting an innocent person. The risk of it is losing the few values he still has; the reward, experiencing love at its most.

== Cast ==
- Eulalia Ramón as Adèle
- Grégoire Colin as Timar
- Martin Lamotte as Eugène
- Mario Gas as Kruger
- Isabel Vera as María
- Martín Adjemián as Enríquez
- Jordi Dauder as Gerente

== Release ==
The film was released in Canada and Spain.
