= Équateur =

Équateur, French for equator, may refer to:

== Places ==
- Province of Équateur, a province of the Democratic Republic of the Congo since 2015
- Équateur (former province), a former province of the Democratic Republic of the Congo, 1966–2015
- Équateur District, a former district of the former province

== Others ==
- Équateur (film), 1983 French drama film directed by Serge Gainsbourg

== See also ==
- Equator (disambiguation)
