= Tchen =

Tchen is a surname. Notable people with the surname include:

- Angelo Tchen (born 1982), Tahitian footballer
- Charles Tchen (born 1950), Gabonese engineer and businessman
- John Kuo Wei Tchen, American historian
- Tina Tchen (born 1956), American lawyer
- Tsebin Tchen (1941–2019), Australian politician
