= Asymmetry of the Intertropical Convergence Zone =

There are a number of explanations of the asymmetry of the Intertropical Convergence Zone (ITCZ), known by sailors as the Doldrums.

== Asymmetrical distribution of continents ==
The ITCZ would be expected to overlie the geographic equator according to symmetric solar radiation. However, the ITCZ is mostly perennial in the northern hemisphere and in the eastern Pacific and Atlantic Oceans. It was originally explained by the asymmetrical distribution of continents. However, the distribution of land and ocean is severely asymmetric in the Indian Ocean, yet the ITCZ moves back and forth there between the southern and northern hemispheres. Continents surround the Indian Ocean and monsoons prevail. Where the thermocline is deeper indicates that there is a weaker interaction between atmosphere and ocean. Due to the relatively small scale and deep thermocline in the Indian Ocean, there will be less asymmetric effects. In the middle latitude Pacific and Atlantic Ocean, because of the large scale easterly wind system and the western continents boundaries, the thermocline is definitely shallower in eastern part. Thus, the asymmetry is obvious in the eastern Pacific and Atlantic Ocean. There are two factors that are acknowledged by oceanographers and meteorologists: the interactions between ocean and atmosphere and the geometries of the continents.

== Asymmetric SST distribution ==
According to observations, the sea surface temperature (SST) of ITCZ in the Northern Hemisphere is higher than the same latitude in the Southern Hemisphere. The asymmetry of ITCZ is triggered by the asymmetric SST distribution, which has been verified by general circulation model (GCM).

=== Wind-evaporation-SST mechanism ===
What is more, because the Cross Equator SST Gradient (CESG) is southward, the cross equator northward wind, which decelerates trade winds north of the equator and accelerates those south of the equator due to Coriolis force, is originated. Thus the evaporation of the northern tropics is weakened, thereby cooling down the northern tropical SST slightly. Vice versa, SST of southern part to the equator is much reduced. Therefore, SST of northern tropical is much higher, and higher than southern tropical, by which increases the CESG. As a result, this positive feedback, which is defined as Wind-Evaporation-SST (WES) will intensify this process.

=== Explanation of asymmetric SST distribution ===
In this way, the WES keeps the ITCZ north of the equator. And the precondition of WES is the asymmetric distribution of SST, and WES also strengthens this process. According to the observation of equatorial upwelling and obvious asymmetry of the ITCZ in the Pacific and Atlantic, it is inferred that it is the equatorial upwelling that prevents the ITCZ being created at the equator. To explain this simply, upwelling brings cold water to the surface, which will cool the above atmosphere and make it stable because of relative high air density due to low temperature. Thus, this area of the equator is different compared to the strong vertical convection and abundant precipitation of the ITCZ. As a result, the SST is latitudinally asymmetric.
