= Etimboue (department) =

Coordinates: 1°34′31″S 9°15′33″E

- Department
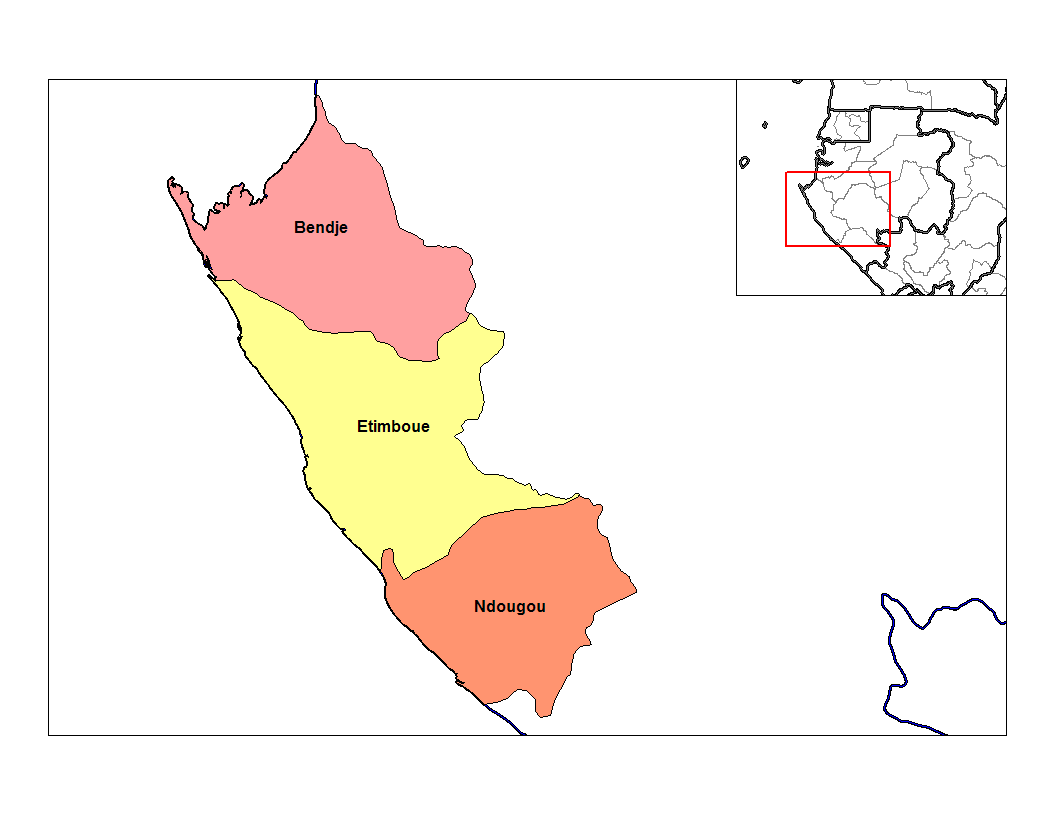
- Etimboue Department in the region
- Country: Gabon
- Province: Ogooué-Maritime Province

Population (2013 Census)
  - Total: 5,723
- Time zone: UTC+1 (GMT +1)

Etimboue is a department of Ogooué-Maritime Province in western Gabon. The capital lies at Omboué. It had a population of 5,723 in 2013.
