= Marie-Francine =

- Directed by: Valérie Lemercier
- Screenplay by: Valérie Lemercier; Sabine Haudepin
- Produced by: Edouard Weil
- Starring: Valérie Lemercier; Patrick Timsit
- Cinematography: Laurent Dailland
- Edited by: Jean-François Elie
- Production company: Rectangle Productions
- Distributed by: Gaumont
- Release date: 31 May 2017
- Running time: 95 minutes
- Countries: France; Belgium
- Language: French
- Budget: $10.8 million
- Box office: $7 million

Marie-Francine is a 2017 French comedy film directed by Valérie Lemercier. Available as "50 is the new 30."

== Cast ==
- Valérie Lemercier as Marie-Francine Doublet
- Patrick Timsit as Miguel Maraõ
- Hélène Vincent as Annick Legay
- Philippe Laudenbach as Pierric Legay
- Denis Podalydès as Emmanuel Doublet
- Nadège Beausson-Diagne as Nadège
- Marie Petiot as Clémence
- Anna Lemarchand as Margot
- Simon Perlmutter as Hélio
- Géraldine Martineau as Anaïs
- Loïc Legendre as Xavier
- Danièle Lebrun as The supermarket woman
- Patrick Préjean as The supermarket man
- Pierre Vernier as The client
- Philippe Vieux as Aymeric
- Clara Simpson as Pamela
- Marie Barraud as Caroline
- Salim Torki as Nordine
