= Dry season =

Yearly period of low rainfall, especially in the tropics

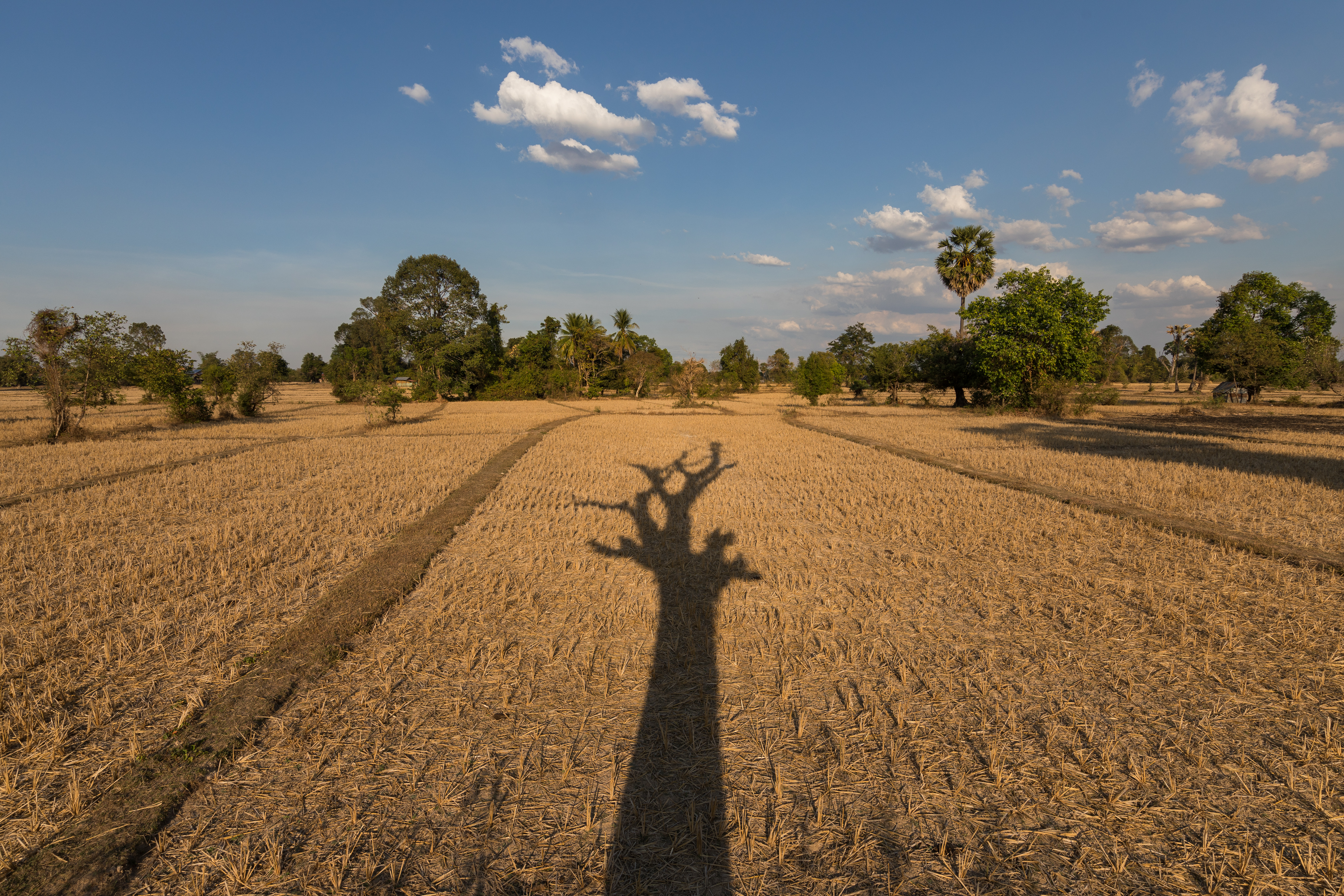
Dry season in Laos. Long shadow of a dead tree with its branches on the dry fields of Don Det, a sunny day with blue sky and white clouds, late afternoon.

The dry season is a yearly period of low rainfall, especially in the tropics. The weather in the tropics is dominated by the tropical rain belt, which moves from the northern to the southern tropics and back over the course of the year. The temperate counterpart to the tropical dry season is summer or winter.

== Rain belt ==
The tropical rain belt lies in the southern hemisphere roughly from November to March; during that time the northern tropics have a dry season with sparser precipitation, and days are typically sunny throughout. From May to September, the rain belt lies in the northern hemisphere, and the southern tropics have their dry season. Under the Köppen climate classification, for tropical climates, a dry season month is defined as a month when average precipitation is below 60 millimetres (2.4 in).

The rain belt reaches roughly as far north as the Tropic of Cancer and as far south as the Tropic of Capricorn. Near these latitudes, there is one wet season and one dry season annually. At the equator there are two wet and two dry seasons, as the rain belt passes over twice a year, once moving north and once moving south. Between the tropics and the equator, locations may experience a short wet or a long wet season; and a short dry or a long dry season. Local geography may substantially modify these climate patterns, however they can.

== Drought ==
During the dry season, humidity is very low, causing some watering holes and rivers to dry up. This lack of water (and lack of food supply) may force many grazing animals to migrate to more fertile spots. Examples of such animals are: zebras, elephants, giraffes, hippos, rhinos, antelopes and wildebeest, wild water buffaloes, African buffaloes, gaur, tapirs, emus, ostriches, rheas, and kangaroos. Because of the lack of water in the plants, bushfires (wildfires) are common.

== Diseases ==
Data shows that in Africa the start of the dry season coincides with a rise in the cases of measles—which researchers believe might be attributed to the higher concentration of people in the dry season, as agricultural operations are all but impossible without irrigation. During this time, some farmers move into cities, creating hubs of higher population density, and allowing the disease to spread more easily.

== Research ==
New data shows that in the seasonal parts of the South American Amazon rainforest, foliage growth and coverage varies between the dry and wet seasons—with about 25% more leaves and faster growth in the dry season. Researchers believe that the Amazon itself has an effect in bringing the onset of the wet season: by growing more foliage, it evaporates more water. However, this growth appears only in the undisturbed parts of the Amazon basin, where researchers believe roots can reach deeper and gather more rainwater. It has also been shown that ozone levels are much higher in the dry than in the wet season in the Amazon basin.
