= Le silence de la forêt =

2003 Central African Republican drama film by Bassek Ba Kobhio and Didier Ouenangare

- Directed by: Bassek Ba Kobhio; Didier Ouenangare
- Screenplay by: Étienne Goyémidé
- Based on: Le silence de la forêt by Étienne Goyémidé
- Produced by: Annie Izoungou; Charles Mensah; Alderrahmane Sissako
- Starring: Eriq Ebouaney; Nadège Beausson-Diagne
- Cinematography: Pierre-Olivier Larrieu
- Music by: Manu Dibango
- Production companies: Les Films Terre Africaine; Centre National du Cinéma du Gabon; Ecrans Noirs Centrafrique
- Release date: 2003
- Running time: 93 minutes
- Countries: Central African Republic; Cameroon; Gabon; France
- Languages: Bantu; French; Sango; English
- Budget: 12 million FF

Le silence de la forêt (lit. 'The Silence of the Forest/The Forest') is a 2003 drama film directed by Bassek Ba Kobhio and Didier Ouenangare. The film is an adaption of the eponymous novel by Étienne Goyémidé. A co-production between Gabon, Cameroon, the Central African Republic, and France, it is the first feature filmed in the Central African Republic. It is also the first film to depict the contemporary prejudice held by some Africans toward the pygmy people.

== Synopsis ==
Gonaba (Eriq Ebouaney), a regional educational inspector in the Central African Republic feels frustrated and disheartened after working in a military regime for over a decade. He becomes interested in advocating for the Baaka, a nomadic Mbenga pygmy group. The film depicts the Baaka as generally ignored and ill-treated in society and whose existence is often threatened by urbanization and economic development.

== Cast ==
- Eriq Ebouaney as Gonaba
- Nadège Beausson-Diagne as Simone
- Sonia Zembourou as Kali
- Philippe Mory as Prefect

== Production ==
The film was initially to be directed by the Central African Republic-based filmmaker Didier Ouenangare in his directorial debut. When Cameroonian director Bassek Ba Kobhio joined the project as lead director, Ouenangare took on the role of co-director. The film was filmed in CAR during a time of economic crisis and a military coup in 2003.

The Forest was funded by Cameroon, Gabon, and France, the former providing a grant of 50000 FF from the Agence intergouvernmentale de la francophonie.

Most of the cast members and crew were recruited from CAR neighbouring nations including Cameroon and Gabon, which prompted criticism aimed at Ouenangare for not selecting Central Africans. Cameroonian actor Eriq Ebouaney was brought on to play the lead role and had to learn Sango, one of the official languages of Central African Republic. Cameroonian veteran music composer Manu Dibango scored the music for the film.

== Release ==
The film's theatrical release in Central African Republic was disrupted since the country's only cinema was closed at that time. The film premiered at the Planet Africa section of the 2003 Toronto International Film Festival and opened to generally positive reviews from critics. As part of its festival circuit, it screened at the Directors' Fortnight section of the 2003 Cannes Film Festival and received special mention at the 2003 Festival International du Film Francophone de Namur (FIFF).

== See also ==
- List of Cameroonian films
- List of Gabonese films
