= Hella Petri =

Hungarian actress

- Born: 18 December 1916; Budapest, Austro-Hungarian Empire
- Died: 14 May 1999 (aged 82); Paris, France
- Other names: Hella Crossley; Hella Lexington
- Occupation: Actress
- Years active: 1944–1995 (Film and TV)

Hella Petri (18 December 1916 – 14 May 1999) was a Hungarian-French actress who appeared in film and television. She began her career with uncredited appearances in several Hollywood productions in the mid-1940s. She subsequently returned to Europe and appeared in supporting roles in films in West Germany and France. She was also sometimes credited as Hella Lexington. She was married to fellow actor Peter von Zerneck.

== Selected filmography ==
- The Mask of Dimitrios (1944)
- Phantom Lady (1944)
- The Hitler Gang (1944)
- Girls of the Big House (1945)
- Sensation Hunters (1945)
- Cloak and Dagger (1946)
- The Midnight Venus (1951)
- Wild West in Upper Bavaria (1951)
- Road to Home (1952)
- The Secret of Helene Marimon (1954)
- Lettere di una novizia (1960)
- No Burials on Sunday (1960)
- A Monkey in Winter (1962)
- Mata Hari, Agent H21 (1964)
- Requiem pour un caïd (1964)
- L'autre femme (1964)
- Relax Darling (1964)
- L'amour à la chaîne (1965)
- Lady L (1965)
- Alyse et Chloé (1970)
- The Marseille Contract (1974)
- Violins at the Ball (1974)
- To Forget Venice (1979)
- La scarlatine (1983)
- Cent francs l'amour (1986)

== Bibliography ==
- Bizio, Silvia & Laffranchi, Claudia. Cinema Italian style: Italians at the Academy Awards. Gremese, 2002.
- Lentz, Harris M. Feature Films, 1960–1969: A Filmography of English-Language and Major Foreign-Language United States Releases. McFarland, 2009.
