= The Great White Man of Lambaréné =

- Le grand blanc de Lambaréné
- Directed by: Bassek Ba Kobhio
- Produced by: Bassek Ba Kobhio
- Release date: 1995
- Running time: 94 minutes
- Countries: Cameroon; Gabon; France
- Language: French

The Great White Man of Lambaréné (Le grand blanc de Lambaréné) is a 1995 biopic of Albert Schweitzer by the Cameroonian filmmaker Bassek Ba Kobhio. The film, made on the site of Schweitzer's hospital at Lambaréné on the Ogooué River in Gabon, has received critical attention as a post-colonial re-interrogation of the myth of Schweitzer.

== Cast ==
- André Wilms as Albert Schweitzer
- Marisa Berenson as Helene Schweitzer
- Alex Descas as Koumba
- Élizabeth Bourgine as Ingrid
- Philippe Mory as The sorcerer
- Anne-Marie Pisani as Berta
- Dany Boon
