= No Burials on Sunday =

1960 film

- Directed by: Michel Drach
- Written by: Michel Drach; Eric Ollivier
- Based on: No Burials on Sunday by Fred Kassak
- Produced by: Michel Drach
- Starring: Philippe Mory; Hella Petri; Marcel Cuvelier
- Cinematography: Jean Tournier
- Edited by: Geneviève Winding
- Music by: Eric Dixon
- Production company: Port Royal Films
- Distributed by: Gaumont Distribution
- Release date: 27 January 1960
- Running time: 95 minutes
- Country: France
- Language: French

No Burials on Sunday (French: On n'enterre pas le dimanche) is a 1960 French crime drama film directed by Michel Drach and starring Philippe Mory, Hella Petri and Marcel Cuvelier. It is based on the 1958 novel by Fred Kassak. It combines elements of film noir and the French New Wave. Drach was awarded the Louis Delluc Prize for his direction.

== Synopsis ==
Philippe a young, aspiring writer from Martinique lives a struggling life in Paris feeling lonely and alienated. He meets the easygoing Swedish tourist Margaretha, but struggles to feel a sense of belonging. When he kills a man in self-defence, he has to try and dispose of the body on a Sunday.

== Cast ==
- Philippe Mory as Philippe Valence
- Christina Bendz as Margaretha Lundal
- Hella Petri as Maryse Courtalès
- Albert Gilou as Monsieur Courtalès
- Marcel Cuvelier as Le commissaire
- Robert Lolliot as L'inspecteur
- Frédéric O'Brady as L'éditeur

== Bibliography ==
- Goble, Alan. The Complete Index to Literary Sources in Film. Walter de Gruyter, 1999.
- Hammer, Tad Bentley. International Film Prizes: An Encyclopedia. Garland, 1991.
- Rège, Philippe. Encyclopedia of French Film Directors, Volume 1. Scarecrow Press, 2009.
- Vincendeau, Ginette & Graham, Peter. The French New Wave: Critical Landmarks. Bloomsbury Publishing, 2022.
