= Charles Mensah =

Gabonese filmmaker (1948–2011)

Charles Mensah تشارلز منساه
- Born: Charles Mensah; 1948; Omboué, Gabon
- Died: 3 June 2011 (aged 63)
- Occupations: Director, producer, screen writer
- Years active: 1983–present

Charles Mensah (1948 – 3 June 2011; Arabic: تشارلز منساه) was a Gabonese filmmaker, screenwriter and production manager. Popularly known as "the Gentleman of African Cinema", Mensah contributed to several critically acclaimed documentaries including Équateur, Les Couilles de l'éléphant and Lybek, the crunch of the alive. In a career spanning more than three decades, he worked the development of independent southern cinema.

== Personal life and Death ==
Charles Mensah was born on 1948 in Omboué, Gabon. He died on 3 June 2011, at the age of 63.

== Career ==
=== Filmmaking ===
In 1976, Mensah directed his first feature fiction film, Obali co-produced with Pierre-Marie Ndong. Then in 1977 he made the second venture Ayouma, co-produced with Ndong and Patience Dabany. Experiencing success with these, Mensah got involved in production, this time with the film Équateur (Equator), written and directed by Serge Gainsbourg, which he co-produced with Alain Poiré. Along with renowned filmmaker Henri-Joseph Koumba Bididi in 1995, Mensah was involved in the Gabonese television series L'Auberge du Salut.

As executive producer, Mensah participated in numerous productions, including: Le Damier de Balufu Bakupu Kanyinda in 1996, Dôlè (l'Argent) by Imunga Iwanga in 2000, Les Couilles de l'éléphant in 2001 and N'Djamena City directed by Issa Serge Coelo in 2006. He was also involved in the short documentary film Lybek, le crunch du vivant.

In 2011, he worked on Bididi's Le collier du Makoko, which gained international recognition, including being selected for screening at the Cannes Film Festival.

Mensah was popularly known as "the Gentleman of African Cinemas".

=== Other activities ===
In a career spanning more than three decades, he worked the development of independent southern cinema.

He was director general of the Centre National du Cinéma Gabonais (CENACI), later known as Gabonese Institute of Image and Sound (IGIS), for more than 20 years. He was also president of Pan African Federation of Filmmakers (FEPACI) as well as in the Film Assistance Fund Commission of the International Francophone Organisation.

== Filmography ==
Year	Film	Role	Genre	Ref.
1976	Obali	Director, co-producer	film	
1983	Ayouma	Director	film	
1983	Équateur (Equator)	co-producer	film	
1983	L'Auberge du Salut (The Auberge du Salut)	producer	TV series	
1996	Le Damier de Balufu Bakupu Kanyinda (The Checkerboard of Balufu Bakupu Kanyinda)	executive producer	film	
2000	Dôlè (l'Argent) (Dôlè (Money))	executive producer	film	
2001	Les Couilles de l'éléphant (The Balls of the Elephant)	executive producer	film	
2006	N'Djamena City	executive producer	film	
2009	Lybek, le crunch du vivant (Lybek, the crunch of the alive)	executive producer	film	
2011	Le collier du Makoko (The Makoko Necklace)	producer	film	
