= Étienne Goyémidé =

Central African writer and playwright

- Born: Étienne Goyémidé; 22 January 1942; Ippy, Central African Republic
- Died: 17 March 1997 (aged 55)
- Occupations: Writer, playwright, poet
- Years active: 1976–1997

Étienne Goyémidé (22 January 1942 – 17 March 1997), was a Central African writer and playwright. He is notable as the writer of critically acclaim novels Le silence de la forêt and Dernier Survivant de la caravane.

== Personal life ==
He was born on 22 January 1942 in Ippy, Central African Republic in a peasant family. From 1991 to 1992, he was Minister of Education and Research. In 1993, he received a grant from the National Book Center in France. He was later appointed Minister of Education and then Honorary Ambassador of UNESCO. He was also a part of the Troupe des Griots before heading the National Troupe of Central Africa.

Goyémidé died on 17 March 1997 at the age of 55.

== Career ==
Goyémidé obtained a degree in educational sciences as well as an English diploma. Then he became a teacher headed the Normal School of Teachers in Bangui. He later worked in education department and was director of a printing house. He also became the director of the National Troupe of Central Africa.

In 1984, he wrote his famous novel Le silence de la forêt (The Silence of the Forest). The story focused on the story of a Central African civil servant who abandons everything to live among the Babinga pygmies. The novel was later adapted to the big screen in 2003 by Didier Florent Ouénangaré and Bassek Ba Kobhio. The film received critical acclaim and was part of the selection of the Directors' Fortnight at the 2003 Cannes Film Festival. In 2003, he received a special mention at the 2003 Festival International du Film Francophone de Namur (FIFF).

In 1985 he wrote the novel Dernier Survivant de la caravane (The Last Survivor of the Caravan). It focuses on the slavery of black Africans perpetrated by North African Muslims as seen through the eyes of Ngalandji who ecounts the drama of his village in Banda country. He was the winner of the RFI competition for the best short story in the French language multiple times.

=== Theater work ===
- La petite leçon, 1976
- Le Monsieur de Paris, 1978
- Au pied du Kapokier, 1978
- Mes respects Monsieur le Directeur, 1978
- Le vertige, 1981
- Les mangeurs de poulets crevés, 1983
- Responsabilité collective, 1988
- Demain... la liberté

== Author work ==
- Le silence de la forêt, 1984
- Dernier Survivant de la caravane, 1985
- In the Name of The Law, 1989

== Filmography ==
| Year | Film | Role | Genre | Ref. |
|---|---|---|---|---|
| 2003 | Le silence de la forêt (The Forest) | Writer | Film | |
