= Tropic Moon =

1933 novel by Georges Simenon

- First edition
- Author: Georges Simenon
- Original title: Coup de Lune
- Translator: Stuart Gilbert; Marc Romano
- Language: French
- Publisher: Éditions Fayard
- Publication date: 1933
- Publication place: Belgium
- Media type: Print (Hardback)
- Pages: xi, 133 (NYRB)

Le Coup de Lune ([lə ku də lyn]; literally "moonburn" or "moonstroke" in French, but translated into English as Tropic Moon, is a 1933 novel by Belgian writer Georges Simenon. It is one of the author's first self-described roman durs or "hard novels" to distinguish it from his romans populaires or "popular novels," which are primarily mysteries that usually feature his famous Inspector Maigret character.

Broadly speaking, the novel deals with French attitudes towards Africans and the French colonial experience. Coup de lune has much in common with the noir fiction subgenre of hardboiled detective fiction, and could be described as being a "colonial noir" story, though arguably there are also some existential elements present in the narrative. In his introduction to the New York Review Books edition, Norman Rush finds certain parallels between this work and Journey to the End of the Night by Céline.

The novel is divided into thirteen chapters and is written using the third person limited narrative voice.

== Plot ==
The story concerns Joseph Timar, a sensitive young Frenchman, who travels from La Rochelle to Libreville in Gabon to work at a job his uncle has arranged for him at SACOVA, a logging business. Upon arriving, he discovers the job is not available; unsure of what to do, he finds temporary residence at a local hotel where he ends up spending his time drinking and playing billiards with a group of hotel regulars: an assortment of loggers and minor government officials. After the first night of his stay, Timar awakens to an unexpected sexual encounter with Adèle, the proprietor's wife. Shortly thereafter, a black servant, Thomas, is found murdered and Adèle's ailing husband Eugène finally dies of snail fever.

The night before Eugène's funeral, using the pretence of leaving Adèle alone to grieve, the regulars convince Timar to come with them on a late night jaunt to a native village. Here the group picks up African women, one of whom is married, but whose husband seems used to his wife being treated as a whore by the white colonials. The group drives to a clearing in woods and a drunken party ensues. Timar stands by while the others steal the women's clothing and drive off laughing.

After the funeral, Adèle convinces Timar to use his uncle's influence to acquire a concession for the two of them for which she will provide the capital. Despite a growing suspicion that Adèle is being less than honest with him, Timar agrees in the heat of his passion for her. The details are worked out, the uncle's letter arrives, and the two begin the journey by riverboat to their new territory. They pause at a village where Adèle inexplicably disappears into a native hut for a time before returning. Timar contracts dengue fever along the way, and spends the rest of the trip in a state of delirium. Some time later, Timar is still suffering, and Adèle decides to bring him back to Libreville for treatment in a boat manned by Gabon tribesmen. He lies in the bottom of the boat, semi-delirious while the tribesmen row, and the return is a blur to him.

Back in Libreville, still weak and intermittently incoherent, Timar learns that a village man is to be charged with the servant Thomas's murder on the basis of eye-witness accounts. Timar later learns that Adèle's stop at the village going upriver was to bribe the witness, who will testify at the trial and convict the innocent villager of Thomas's murder. Because Adèle is the one bribing the witness, Timar realizes that she was the murderer, and he discovers that Adèle did it to stop Thomas from blackmailing her. Thomas had threatened to tell Adèle's husband about her adulteries with Timar and a half-dozen other men, all of whom, including the police commissioner, are now helping Adèle get the innocent villager convicted so that they may continue their relationships with her. Timar becomes further unhinged by all of this knowledge, and now completely helpless, is put on a ship headed back to France, muttering incoherently to himself as the ship leaves the port.

== English language editions ==
There are two English translations of Coup de Lune, the first by Stuart Gilbert, which has been included in two anthologies: In Two Latitudes (George Routledge, 1942; Penguin Books, 1952) and African Trio (Harcourt Brace Jovanovich, 1979). The second translation is by Marc Romano (New York Review Books Classics series, 2009).

== Adaptations ==
The 1983 film Équateur, written and directed by Serge Gainsbourg, was based on Coup de Lune.
