= Murder of Kathy Bonney =

Crime in North Carolina, United States

Kathy Bonney
- Born: Kathy Carol Bonney; August 6, 1968; Norfolk, Virginia, US
- Died: November 21, 1987 (aged 19); Norfolk, Virginia, US
- Cause of death: Homicide (multiple gunshots)
- Body discovered: November 22, 1987
- Known for: Murder victim
- Parent(s): Thomas Lee Bonney; Dorothy Mae Bonney

On November 21, 1987, 19-year-old Kathy Carol Bonney was killed by her father Thomas Lee Bonney in Camden County, North Carolina. The case gained media attention not only due to the brutal manner in which the killing had been carried out, but also because Tom Bonney pleaded not guilty by reason of insanity on the grounds that he had dissociative identity disorder and that an evil personality state was in control at the time of the killing. The book Deadly Whispers by Ted Schwarz and a television movie of the same name are based on the case.

== Background ==
Thomas Lee "Tom" Bonney lived in Chesapeake, Virginia, where he ran an auto salvage yard. According to his defense attorneys, Tom Bonney's childhood had been a troubled one, as he suffered physical abuse at the hands of his father. Bonney and his wife Dorothy Mae had six children, the oldest of whom were Kathy Carol (August 6, 1968 – November 21, 1987) and Susan Christine (born 1972).

Susan Bonney described her father as strict and controlling, saying he never allowed his children to date. A former business partner of Tom Bonney's described him as having a poor memory and susceptibility to mood swings concerning religious topics. Near the time of Kathy's death, he had noticed Tom Bonney acting strange. According to him, Tom Bonney had a love-hate relationship with his father.

== Sequence of events ==
On November 21, 1987, some time after 7 p.m., Tom Bonney left the family home with his daughter Kathy, ostensibly to look at a truck which was for sale. Kathy's sister Susan saw Tom and Kathy in the car at a nearby 7-Eleven store and driving away soon after. Bonney drove across the North Carolina state border; he would later state that the killing had taken place in North Carolina. According to his defense attorneys, an argument between father and daughter over her lover ensued, in which Kathy swore at her father and reached for a gun he carried in his vehicle, which went off. Her comments caused him to have a flashback to his childhood, and a personality referred to as “Demian” took control of him. Tom Bonney shot his daughter 27 times and dumped her body alongside the Dismal Swamp Canal.

After about two hours Tom Bonney returned home alone and asked if anyone knew where Kathy was. Susan went out to the 7-Eleven store to look for Kathy; Tom Bonney did not participate in the search.

== Investigation ==
On the morning of November 22, Tom Bonney reported Kathy missing at the Chesapeake police department. He upheld his narrative of the previous evening, claiming that he had taken Kathy to the 7-Eleven store to meet a man Kathy knew, named John, who wanted to sell his Chevrolet Blazer. Kathy had gone for a test drive with him around 9:00 p.m. and never returned. Bonney stated he did not grow suspicious until the next morning, as his daughter had stayed out all night once before. Police told him that, since Kathy was an adult, a missing-person report could only be filed after 24 hours. Bonney phoned the police again shortly before 7 p.m., stating Kathy was still missing. An officer went to the Bonneys’ home, and Bonney repeated his version of the events.

Kathy Bonney's nude body was found around 3:00 p.m., on the outskirts of Elizabeth City near the Dismal Swamp Canal along U.S. Route 17 in Camden County, just over the state line from Chesapeake. A blood-stained undergarment with a ripped bottom was found near her body. Her face was so badly disfigured that she could only be identified through her fingerprints. The autopsy identified a total of 27 gunshot wounds to Kathy's head, torso and legs, some of which had been inflicted after death. Her body showed no evidence of sexual activity. The blood stains on the clothes found with the body matched Kathy's blood type.

A search of Kathy's room revealed a letter to her lover, some adult magazines and a pair of handcuffs.

Tom Bonney helped police prepare a composite of the alleged suspect and upheld his version of the events on November 21 for several weeks. However, police noted inconsistencies in his statements: on some occasions he claimed to have driven his wrecker on the night of November 21, on others he stated he had driven his Chevrolet. He furthermore claimed that his .22-caliber sawed-off rifle had been stolen from him a week prior to Kathy's disappearance, and that he had sold the nine-shot .22 revolver. He also sold his Chevrolet in the days after Kathy disappeared, but reported seeing it again a few days later, prompting police to seize the car.

In December 1987, Susan Bonney told police that she had seen blood stains in her father's car the night Kathy disappeared, and that she was afraid of her father. Police indeed found blood stains which matched Kathy's blood type. Traces of Kathy's hair were found in the rear and trunk of the Chevrolet.

Tom Bonney fled on December 11, while Dorothy Bonney went into hiding out of fear of him, and Social Services officials took custody of the family's other children.

Bonney was apprehended in Indianapolis on January 31, 1988, and taken to North Carolina. He began a series of interviews with psychologist Dr. Paul Dell in July 1988, who diagnosed him with dissociative identity disorder, along with post-traumatic stress disorder and mixed personality disorder. According to Dell, Bonney's condition was the result of a psychological trauma he experienced at the death of his grandmother, when he was ten years old. Using hypnosis, Dell identified ten separate personalities in Bonney—Tom (the host personality), Satan, Mamie, Demian, Viking, Tommy, Hitman, Preacher, Dad, and Kathy—each of which had a function which enabled Bonney to cope with a trauma he had experienced. The interviews were videotaped. In one recording Bonney claimed that Kathy was still alive and visiting him every night in his prison cell.

== Trial ==
The first trial against Tom Bonney began in Elizabeth City, North Carolina, on October 17, 1988. Much of the court proceedings revolved around his mental state, and videotapes of his sessions with Dell were presented as evidence. His court-appointed attorneys contended he was not guilty by reason of insanity as he had dissociative identity disorder. At the time of the killing, a personality referred to as “Demian”, characterized by blind rage, had been in control and believed he was shooting Bonney's abusive father. According to Dell, Bonney was incapable of understanding his actions or their consequences, and could not distinguish right from wrong at the time.

Dr. Philip Coons, a psychiatrist appointed by the prosecution who had reviewed some 13 hours of video footage of Bonney's sessions with Dell but had not interviewed Bonney and made no diagnosis, was critical of Dell's methods in multiple points. According to him, Dell had not conducted a proper psychiatric interview at the beginning, allowed Bonney to ramble, asked him leading questions and improperly suggested to Bonney that he might have other personalities while Bonney was under hypnosis. According to Coons, death of a family member was not sufficient to induce dissociative identity disorder, but the symptoms could have been created by hypnosis.

A physician who had treated Bonney in hospital in early October 1988 testified that Bonney showed symptoms consistent with Dell's diagnosis. However, in his opinion Bonney did know the nature and quality of his act and the difference between right and wrong when he killed his daughter.

A jury found Tom Bonney guilty of first-degree murder on November 25, 1988, after a seven-week trial, and sentenced him to death on November 30.

Bonney appealed the verdict, and the North Carolina Supreme Court voided the death sentence on June 12, 1991, although the murder conviction was upheld. The court found that the defense had presented strong evidence of mitigating factors, including a dissociative identity disorder, and that the jury in the original trial had been improperly instructed in its consideration of the death penalty. The case was remanded to the Superior Court, Camden County, pending psychiatric examination of Bonney.

After Bonney was found competent to stand trial, the resentencing hearing began in Chowan Superior Court on August 24, 1992. As Bonney's guilt had already been established, the new jury was only to fix the punishment. The hearing was aborted after an outburst by Bonney in the courtroom forced the judge to declare a mistrial. Bonney's attorneys claimed he was incompetent to stand trial and did not understand the proceedings. The judge ordered a new round of psychiatric treatment for Bonney, suspending further proceedings until Bonney was declared competent to stand another trial.

Bonney was eventually sentenced to life in prison by Camden County Superior Court on October 16, 2007.

== Aftermath ==
Tom Bonney made a first escape attempt during his first trial. He jumped from the car in which he was being transported and ran for about 50 feet, still handcuffed, before he was apprehended.

On July 29, 1994, around 8:30 a.m., Bonney and a fellow inmate escaped from Central Prison through a trash compacting chute and hid in a garbage truck. While it was initially speculated that both had been crushed to death in a trash compactor during their escape attempt, the two men had stolen a car and driven to Hampton Beach. Bonney was captured by police four days later and offered no resistance. He explained the escape had been a spontaneous idea. His main motivation had been to visit the grave of his mother, who had died five years earlier while he was on death row and whose funeral he was unable to attend, and the grave of his daughter Kathy. After doing so, he wandered around the Ocean View area and said that, had he not been apprehended, he would have turned himself in after a few days to get food and medication, as he had injured himself during his escape attempt.

== In the media ==
- Ted Schwarz's 1992 book Deadly Whispers is a documentary of the case, mainly based on court documents as neither Tom nor Dorothy Bonney were available for interviews.
- The 1995 television movie Deadly Whispers was inspired by the book. Although the plot is fictional, it is very similar to the Bonney case.
- The case was also featured on episode 128 of American Justice, The Killer Within.
- It was also featured in the first season of Swamp Murders, Multiple Personalities.

== See also ==
- List of solved missing person cases: 1950–1999
