= Equador, Rio Grande do Norte =

Municipality in Rio Grande do Norte, Brazil

Equador
- Municipality
- The Municipality of Equador
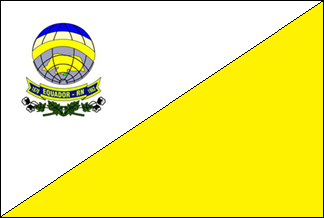
- Flag

- Location of Equador
- Coordinates: 06°56′42″S 36°43′04″W
- Country: Brazil
- Region: Northeast
- State: Rio Grande do Norte

Government
  - Mayor: Vanildo Fernandes Bezerra

Area
  - Total: 264.983 km^{2} (102.311 sq mi)

Population (2020)
  - Total: 6,054
  - Density: 21.9/km^{2} (57/sq mi)
- Time zone: UTC-3
- HDI (2000): 0.665 – medium

Equador (lit. "Equator") is the southernmost city in the Brazilian state of Rio Grande do Norte. It is known as the 'City of Sun' by Brazilians.
