= Didier Ouénangaré =

Central African Republic film director (1953–2006)

Didier Florent Ouénangaré
- Born: 1953; Bambari.
- Died: 29 September 2006 (aged 52–53)
- Citizenship: Central African Republic
- Education: University of Rennes
- Occupations: documentary filmmaker; director; producer
- Known for: The Silence of the Forest

Didier Florent Ouénangaré (1953–2006) was a film director from the Central African Republic, best known for his collaboration with Cameroonian filmmaker Bassek Ba Kobhio on The Silence of the Forest, an adaptation of a novel by Étienne Goyémidé.

== Life ==
Ouénangaré was born in Bambari. After studying film in Abidjan in the Ivory Coast, he graduated from the University of Rennes.

The Silence of the Forest was a project conceived by Ouénangaré, who approached Bassek Ba Kobhio to help find financing. It was written in French and Sango, and filmed in Central African Republic and Gabon. It tells the story of Gonaba, an African educated in Europe, who decides to return to his homeland, but increasingly realises the impossibility of breaking through stereotypes and genuinely understanding the way of life of the Baka people, the 'people of the forest' whom he pejoratively labels 'pygmies'.

Ouénangaré died on 29 September 2006.

== Filmography ==
- Le silence de la forêt [The Silence of the Forest], 2003
