= Bassek Ba Kobhio =

Cameroonian filmmaker and writer (1957–2026)

- Born: 1 January 1957; Nindjé, French Cameroon
- Died: 12 May 2026 (aged 69); Yaoundé, Cameroon
- Citizenship: Cameroonian
- Occupations: Film director, producer, writer, diplomat
- Years active: 1980s–2026
- Notable work: Le grand blanc de Lambaréné

Bassek Ba Kobhio (1 January 1957 – 12 May 2026) was a Cameroonian filmmaker and writer who was the founder of the Écrans Noirs film festival in Yaounde, Cameroon. He was also the Director of the Higher Institute of Cinema and Audiovisual Professionals of Central Africa (ISCAC) in Yaounde, the first-ever tertiary training institution for cinematography in the Central Africa sub-region.

== Background ==
Bassek Ba Kobhio was born in Nindjé in 1957. He started as a writer, winning a short story award while still in high school in 1976.

Kobhio's first feature film, Sango Malo (1991) was an auto-adaptation of his earlier novel. The film portrayed a new village school teacher whose indifference to traditional customs causes conflict with the school's headmaster and disrupts village life. His second film, Le grand blanc de Lambaréné (1995), brought out the complexities of character of Albert Schweitzer. Despite clear differences of setting and subject matter, both films "offer vivid portraits of flawed idealists who wish to do good, but are authoritarian, puritanical, at odds with their surroundings and neglectful towards their womenfolk".

In 2003 he collaborated with Didier Ouénangaré on The Silence of the Forest, an adaptation of a novel by Étienne Goyémidé.

Kobhio died in Yaoundé on 12 May 2026, at the age of 69.

== Cultural leadership ==
=== Écrans Noirs Film Festival ===
In 1997, he founded the Écrans Noirs Film Festival in Yaoundé, which became a major platform for African cinema.

== Works ==
=== Films ===
- Sango Malo / The Village Teacher, 1990
- Le grand blanc de Lambaréné / The Great White Man of Lambaréné, 1995
- Musique s'en va-t-en guerre [Music goes to war], 1997. Documentary.
- (with Didier Ouénangaré) Le silence de la forêt / The Forest, 2003

=== Books ===
- Sango Malo: le maître du canton [Sango Malo: the village teacher], Paris: L'Harmattan, 1981
- Les eaux qui débordent: nouvelles, Paris: L'Harmattan, 1984

== Legacy ==
Bassek Ba Kobhio is considered one of the most influential figures in African cinema. His contributions span filmmaking, cultural institution-building, and the international promotion of African audiovisual industries.

His founding of the Écrans Noirs Festival and his cinematic works helped shape the development of the film sector in Central Africa.
