= Henri-Joseph Koumba Bididi =

Gabonese filmmaker

Henri-Joseph Koumba Bididi هنري جوزيف كومبا بيديدي
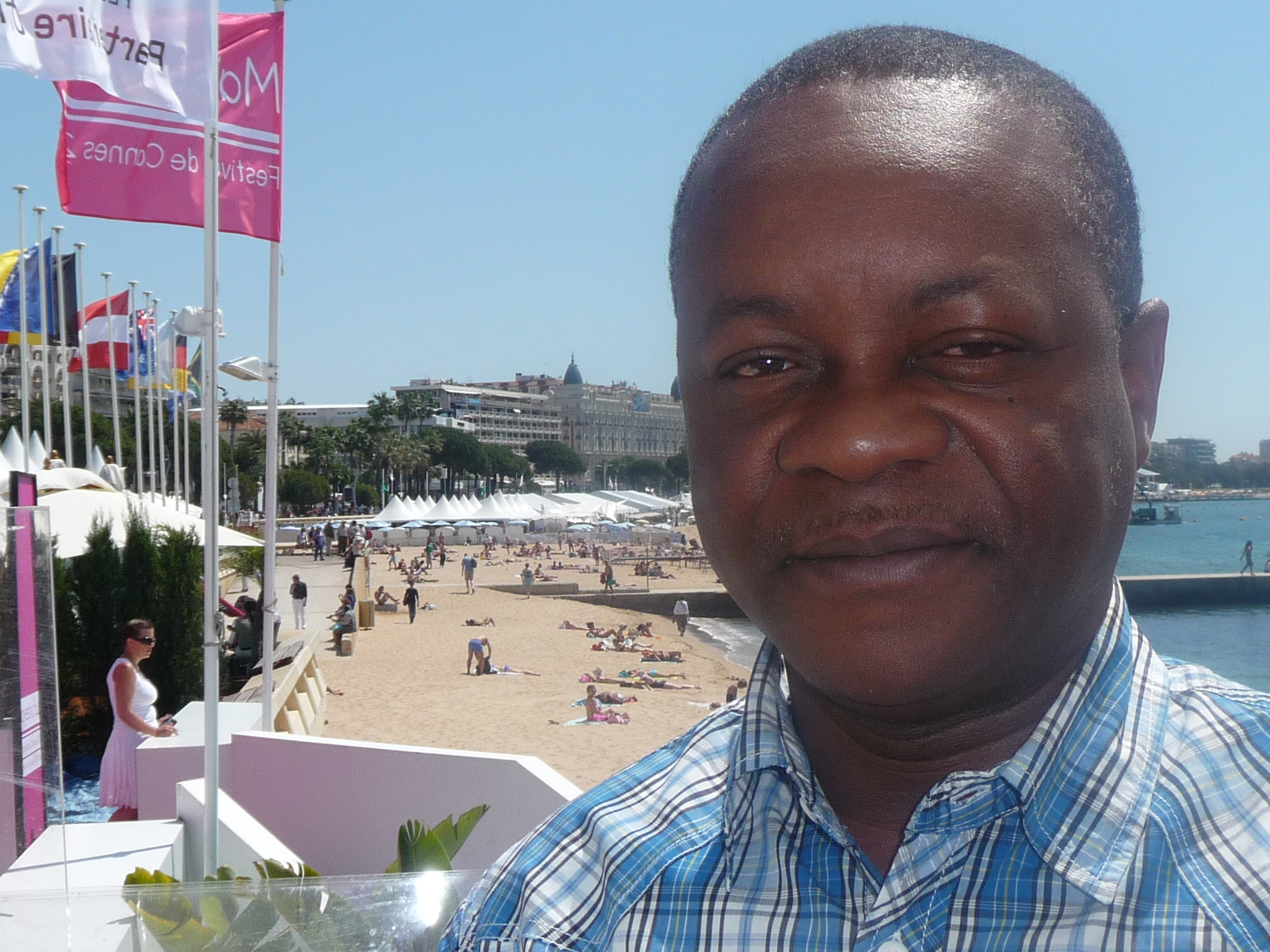
- Henri-Joseph Koumba Bididi at the Cannes Film Festival, May 2011
- Born: Henri-Joseph Koumba Bididi; 15 July 1957 (age 69); Omboué, Gabon
- Education: École supérieure d'études cinématographiques
- Occupations: Director, producer, screenwriter
- Years active: 1983–present

Henri-Joseph Koumba Bididi (Arabic: هنري جوزيف كومبا بيديدي; born 15 July 1957), is a Gabonese director, screenwriter and producer. He has made several critically acclaimed films including the short Le Singe Fou (2008) and Le Collier du Makoko (2011).

== Personal life ==
He was born on 15 July 1957 in Omboué, Gabon. He graduated in film education from École supérieure d'études cinématographiques (E.S.E.C) in France.

== Career ==
In 1983, Bididi worked as the in–charge of the casting for the film Équateur directed by Serge Gainsbourg. Then in 1986, he signed to the short film Le singe fou. He was awarded the prize for criticism of Arab journalists at the Carthage Film Festival and also the Great Short Film award at 10th Panafrican Film and Television Festival of Ouagadougou (FESPACO) in 1987.

From 1988 to 1991, Bididi was the director of the regional radio and television broadcasting unit of 'Haut-Ogoué'. From 1991 to 1994, Bididi was promoted to the new deputy director general of Radio Télévision Gabonaise (RTG). In 2000, he continued to work as a director for television and a producer for his maiden feature film, Les Couilles de l'éléphant. The film was screened at 17th Pan African Film Festival in Ouagadougou, Burkina Faso. In 1994, Bididi directed two episodes of the TV series L’auberge du Salut.

From 2003 to 2008, he worked as Associate producer of television serial Affaires Voisins and then as the Executive producer and co-writer of the serial Les Annèes Écoles as well as directed 6 episodes. In 2011, he directed second feature film Le collier du Makoko. He was the co-writer and executive producer of the soap opera TV series Claudia et dora.

In the same year, he directed the feature film Le collier du Makoko, which is most expensive film in sub-Saharan Africa shot with a cost of 4 million euros. The film was prepared over 4 years, where the shooting took three months. The film received critical acclaim from several international film festivals and won the Special jury prize and male interpretation prize at the 2012 Khouribga festival in Morocco. It also won the Interpretation award at the 2012 Écrans Noirs Festival in Cameroon as then Prize for best soundtrack and best poster at FESPACO 2013. In 2013, the film won Audience Award at the 2013 Masuku Film Festival in Gabon.

== Filmography ==
Year	Film	Role	Genre	Ref.
1983	Équateur (Ecuador)	Casting in–charge	film	
1986	Singe fou (Crazy monkey)	Casting in–charge	short film	
1995	L'Auberge du Salut (The Auberge du Salut)	Director	TV series	
2001	Les Couilles de l'éléphant (The Balls of the Elephant)	Director, writer	feature film	
2002	Djogo	Director, writer	film	
2003	Affaires Voisins (Neighboring Affairs)	Associate producer	TV series	
2007	Jour de la grand nuit (Day of the big night)	Director	film	
2008	Le divorce (The divorce)	co-producer	short film	
2009	Le Lion de Poubara (The Lion of Poubara)	co-producer	short film	
2003	Les Annèes Écoles (The School Years)	Director, executive producer, co-writer	TV series	
2009	Claudia et dora (Claudia and Dora)	Executive producer, co-writer	film	
2011	Le collier du Makoko (The Makoko Necklace)	Director, writer, dialogue	feature film	
2019	Sens Dessus Dessous (Direction Above Below)	executive producer	TV mini-series	
