= Amédée Pacôme Nkoulou =

Gabonese film director (born 1988)

- Born: 1988 (age 37–38); Libreville
- Occupation: Film director
- Notable work: Boxing Libreville (2018)

Amédée Pacôme Nkoulou (born 1988) is a Gabonese film director.

== Career ==
Nkoulou received his baccalaureate in 2007 and then went to study cinematography and audiovisual production at the Institut Supérieur de l'Image et du Son in Ouagadougou. He returned to Gabon in 2011 and worked as an intern on several projects. He served as assistant director on Samantha Biffot's L'oeil de la cité (2012), Nadine Otsobogo's Dialemi (2013) and Pauline Mvélé's Sans Famille (2013). In 2014, Nkoulou's first film, Moane Mory, a 20-minute short, was released after two years of preparation. With funding from the Gabonese government entity Igis, the film depicts a meeting at an art exhibition between young student Isa and Jack, a painter in his forties, that develops into love. Moane Mory was selected to the European Cinema Festival at Libreville and the short film corner at the 2014 Cannes Film Festival.

His second film, Une vie après le bloc, was released in 2016. This documentary examines two Gabonese doctors who install pacemakers and knee prosthetics. Nkoulou's first feature-length film, Boxing Libreville, was released in 2018. It depicts a young aspiring boxer, Christ, as he trains in Libreville amidst the backdrop of the 2016 Gabonese presidential election. Boxing Libreville was entered in the International Short and Medium Film Competition at the Visions du Réel. It received the award for best documentary at the festival de cine africano de Tarif in Spain. It was screened at several other film festivals, including the Internationales Dokumentarfilmfestival München and Ecrans Noirs in Cameroon.

== Filmography ==
- Moane Mory (2014)
- Une vie après le bloc (2016)
- Boxing Libreville (2018)
