= Deadly Whispers =

- Genre: Drama
- Written by: Ted Schwarz
- Screenplay by: Denis Turner
- Directed by: Bill L. Norton
- Starring: Tony Danza; Pamela Reed
- Theme music composer: Joseph Conlan
- Country of origin: United States
- Original language: English

Production
- Running time: 97 min.
- Production company: Leonard Hill Films

Original release
- Release: May 10, 1995

Deadly Whispers is a 1995 television film depicting a father with alleged dissociative identity disorder who murders his daughter. Based on Ted Schwarz's book of the same name, it is a fictionalized account of the murder of Kathy Bonney in 1987.

== Plot ==
The Actons are a blue-collar family living in a rural area in West Virginia. Tom and Carol have spent the early days of their marriage living in a tent, but the salvage yard Tom runs has allowed him to support his wife and three children Kathy, Peter and Crystal, and buy a house. A loving yet strict father, Tom is unhappy about the life choices of 19-year-old Kathy: she has dropped out of school and is now working in the office of her father’s business, but is dreaming of becoming a writer. Pretty and flirtatious, Kathy is having an affair with a married man, Jim McDaniel, who works at the salvage yard. Following numerous arguments with her father, she has plans of moving out of her parents’ home.

One day Tom returns from work and reports Kathy missing. By his account, the two had agreed to meet a customer at a convenience store in order to buy his pick-up truck. Kathy and the customer had gone for a test drive and never returned. Tom suspects Jim of being involved, while neighbor Betty believes Kathy might simply have run away and will return eventually. Carol remembers that in the days before her disappearance, Kathy had expressed worries that an ex-boyfriend might be stalking her.

The body of a young woman matching Kathy’s description is found a few days later, shot several times and badly disfigured. Both Tom and Carol state that the woman is not Kathy, but police later identify her through her fingerprints. In the meantime Tom is beginning to act strangely: he is out in the yard late at night, cutting the lawn with clippers and refusing to come into the house until he has finished. He is hearing voices that belittle him.

Police follow the leads Tom has given. However, none of the witnesses has seen Tom, Kathy or the red Chevy pick-up truck Tom claims Kathy left in at the time in question, nor is there any other evidence to back up his version. But even when confronted with these facts, Carol continues to believe in Tom’s innocence.

When Peter and Crystal are removed from their parents by court order and while Tom’s strange behavior continues, Carol’s faith in her husband begins to wane. She confronts him, and he sets off, promising to find out what happened. He calls her the next day, claiming to have found the red pick-up truck, and she calls the police to the scene. They find one of the cars from Tom’s lot with blood stains on the front passenger seat. Tom, in the meantime, is on the road in a truck, having fantasies of Kathy riding in the truck with him. Police arrest him the night after.

Carol learns that Tom has been diagnosed with dissociative identity disorder, “as if there are several people living in the same body, and they don’t always know what each other is doing”. She reveals that she has noticed strange behaviors in Tom before but took it for stress-induced moodiness. When she is allowed to talk to Tom, she experiences him going through multiple personality states, at first acting like an intimidated child, then abruptly switching to a cold, abusive personality before he is led away.

In Tom’s next session with psychologist Dr. Miller, Carol witnesses him re-live an experience he had at age 13: his father humiliated him and made him cut the lawn with a pair of clippers. He made a move to stab his father to death with the clippers, but eventually got scared and backed down, for which his father mocked him even further. Tom spent the entire night outside in the cold, cutting grass. In court, the psychologist explains that she has identified as many as six different personalities in Tom. It is revealed that Tom drove Kathy to the place where her body was later found, and confronted her about her affair with Jim. An argument ensued, in which Kathy insulted Tom with the same words his father had used, triggering a flashback in Tom and prompting him to kill her, thinking he was killing his abusive father.

In the final scenes, Carol is shown taking over her husband’s business, visiting Tom in prison to bid him farewell, and embracing her kids as they are allowed to return home.

== Cast ==
- Tony Danza as Tom Acton
  - Kevin Mason as 13-year-old Tom Acton
- Pamela Reed as Carol Acton
- Heather Tom as Kathy Acton
- Michael P. McCarthy as Peter Acton
- Amanda Fuller as Crystal Acton
- Sean Haberle as Jim McDaniel
- Camryn Manheim as Betty
- Ving Rhames as Detective Jackson
- Richard Gross as Attorney Brandon
- Maureen McVerry as Dr. Miller
- Sal Landi as Tom’s father

== Reception ==
Variety said of the film, "Tony Danza is the drawing card, but it’s Pamela Reed who takes home the chips."

Based on 78 reviews, Rotten Tomatoes gave the film a rating of 27%.
