= Inspector-General of Intelligence and Security =

Inspector-General of Intelligence and Security may refer to:

- Inspector-General of Intelligence and Security (Australia)
- Inspector-General of Intelligence and Security (New Zealand)
