= The Cage (1963 film) =

- Directed by: Robert Darène
- Written by: Marc Boureau; Alain Bouvette; Robert Darène
- Starring: Marina Vlady; Jean Servais; Philippe Mory
- Cinematography: Jacques Lang
- Edited by: Georges Arnstam
- Release date: 1963
- Running time: 85 minutes
- Country: France
- Language: French

The Cage (French: La Cage) is a 1963 French film directed by Robert Darène. It was entered into the 1963 Cannes Film Festival.

== Cast ==
- Marina Vlady
- Jean Servais - Rispal
- Philippe Mory
- Muriel David
- Colette Duval
- Alain Bouvette
