= Charles Tchen =

Gabonese engineer and businessman (born 1950)

- Born: 17 September 1950 (age 75); Omboue, Gabon
- Occupation: Petroleum Engineer
- Title: His Excellency
- Parents: Father: Tchen Son Tsin; Mother: Wora Ernestine
- Relatives: Jean Ping; Joseph Rendjambé

Charles Tchen (born 17 September 1950) is a Gabonese engineer and businessman. He is currently the CEO of Independent Petroleum Consultants (IPC), and honorary consul of the Netherlands in Gabon. He is an administrator for Shell Gabon.

== Early life and education ==
Tchen was born in Omboue, Gabon. He studied in Germany and graduated in 1972.

== Career ==
Tchen began his career at the oil company Shell in 1972 as a mechanical engineer and worked for Shell in Gabon, the Netherlands, and Tunisia. He eventually served as Deputy General Director and then as Directeur Général Délégué (akin to Chief Operating Officer) of Shell Gabon. Following his retirement from Shell, he became CEO of Independent Petroleum Consultants (IPC). He is also a representative of Ophir Energy.

Since 1989, Tchen has been an honorary consul for the Netherlands and has worked to expand economic relations between the Netherlands and Gabon. He has headed the Union of Gabonese Petroleum Engineers (Union des pétroliers gabonais, UPEGA) and the Society of Petroleum Engineers (Société des ingénieurs du pétrole). Tchen has also been involved with a number of projects such as the plantation in the south of Gabon. He is also the owner of a hotel named Olako close to Port-Gentil, in the small town of Omboue.

== Personal life ==
Tchen lives in Gabon. He is the cousin both of diplomat and politician Jean Ping, and the late leader of the Gabonese opposition party Parti gabonais du progrès, Joseph Rendjambé.

== Distinctions ==
Tchen has received the following awards:

- A distinction at the 17th Africa Oil week for Distinguished Contribution To The African Industry 2010.
- The title of Knight of the Order of Orange-Nassau by the Netherlands for his humanitarian work.
- The title of Commander of the National Order of Merit by Gabon (L'Ordre National du Merite Gabonais au Grade de Commandeur).
