= Boxing Libreville =

2018 Gabonese documentary film

- Film poster
- Directed by: Amédée Pacôme Nkoulou
- Produced by: Princesse M ADV Productions; Les Films du Bilboquet
- Distributed by: Film Africa
- Release date: 11 June 2018
- Running time: 54 minutes
- Country: Gabon
- Language: French

Boxing Libreville is a documentary film released in 2018 about the struggles and hardship a young Gabonese man, Christ, has in his journey to be a boxer and how it is mirrored in the struggle for democracy in the country. It is directed by Amédée Pacôme Nkoulou, and is his feature length film debut.

== Synopsis ==
Filmed in 2016 Christ Olsen Mickala is a young aspiring boxer living in Libreville, the capital of the central African nation of Gabon. Christ spends all day training in boxing, while at night he works as a doorman at local nightclubs to make ends meet. Meanwhile, the struggle Christ endures in his boxing dream is mirrored by the struggle for democracy in Gabon during that year's controversial and hotly contested presidential election. Although the election seems to be only a background, its impact on Gabon will affect its people for many years to come.

== Production ==
The documentary was produced by Princess M, ADV Productions, and Les Films du Bilboquet. As is often the case with African cinema, special care was taken to avoid censorship, such as focusing primarily on Christ's life and training and not on politics, although the latter is a major undertone of the film. The production of the film was an international collaboration, with Princess M being based in Gabon, ADV Productions being based in Belgium, and Les Films du Bilboquet being based in France.

== Release and reception ==
Boxing Libreville was enthusiastically received. It received the award for best documentary at the Festival de cine africano de Tarif in Spain. The film also received the Special Jury Prize of the Agadir International Documentary Film Festival in Morocco. Boxing Libreville was entered in the International Short and Medium Film Competition at the Visions du Réel. It was screened at several other film festivals, including the Internationales Dokumentarfilmfestival München and Ecrans Noirs in Cameroon. The director has discussed creating a sequel.
