= Omboué =

- Coat of arms

- Location in Gabon
- Coordinates: 1°34′S 9°15′E
- Country: Gabon
- Province: Ogooué-Maritime Province
- Department: Etimboué Department

Population (2008)
  - Total: 2,057
- Time zone: UTC+01:00 (West Africa Time Zone)
- Area code: OMB

Omboué is a town located in Ogooué-Maritime province, Gabon.

== Geography ==
It is the departmental capital of Etimboué Department. It is situated on the shores of the Fernan Vaz lagoon. It is 589 km away from the national capital, Libreville, by road, but about 200 km in a direct line.

== Languages ==
The most commonly spoken languages in Omboué are Nkomi (a dialect of Myene) and French (the official language of Gabon).

== Facilities ==
Within the town is a hospital, a government primary and secondary school, a hotel, a commercial port, a church and a marina pontoon.

== Notable people ==
- Jean Ping - politician
- Joseph Rendjambé
- Charles Tchen
