= Thermal equator =

Climate zone of highest average temperatures

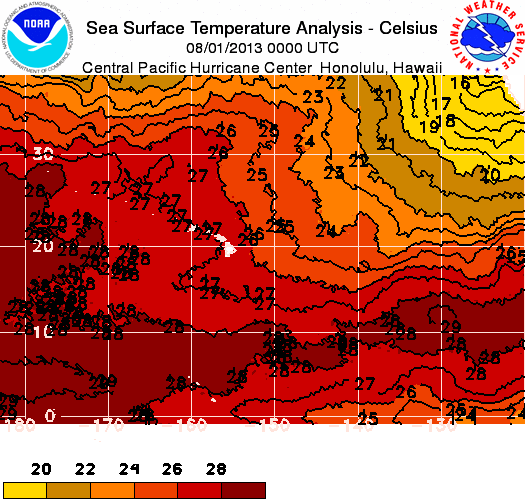
Sea surface temperature analysis clearly shows highest temperatures reaching 28 °C (82 °F) and more along the 10°N latitude and not along the geographic equator. The reasons are the two cold currents: California Current at Northeast and Humboldt Current along the equatorial line. The Hawaiian Islands (in white near map center) have higher temperatures than the equatorial line near the coast of South America because cold waters from upwelling along the California coast are farther away than the thermal equator, and therefore these cold waters warm up for several thousands of kilometres.

The thermal equator (also known as "the heat equator") is a belt encircling Earth, defined by the set of locations having the highest mean annual temperature at each longitude around the globe. Because local temperatures are sensitive to the geography of a region, mountain ranges and ocean currents ensure that smooth temperature gradients (such as might be found if Earth were uniform in composition and devoid of surface irregularities) are impossible; thus, the location of the thermal equator is not necessarily identical to that of the geographic Equator.

The term is less frequently used to describe the belt of maximum temperatures surrounding the globe which migrates roughly between the Tropic of Cancer and the Tropic of Capricorn. This region is known as the Intertropical Convergence Zone. This zone is the result of trade winds from the northern and southern part of the hemisphere eventually joining together.

Still another definition states that the thermal equator is the latitude at which insolation is identical throughout the year. This is not the same as the astronomical equator because Earth reaches perihelion (the minimum distance from the Sun in its orbit) in early January and is at aphelion (maximum distance) in early July. Therefore, insolation is somewhat higher at 0° latitude in January than in July even though the height of the Sun (at noon) and the length of day (from sunrise to sunset) is essentially the same. At a few degrees north of the Equator, the perihelion/aphelion factor is balanced by the fact that the angle of the Sun is slightly more direct, and the days are slightly longer, at the time of the summer solstice for the Northern Hemisphere (most commonly on June 21), making the level of insolation virtually the same in both "summer" and "winter."

== See also ==
- Solar equator
