= Solar equator =

Imaginary and wandering line on the Earth

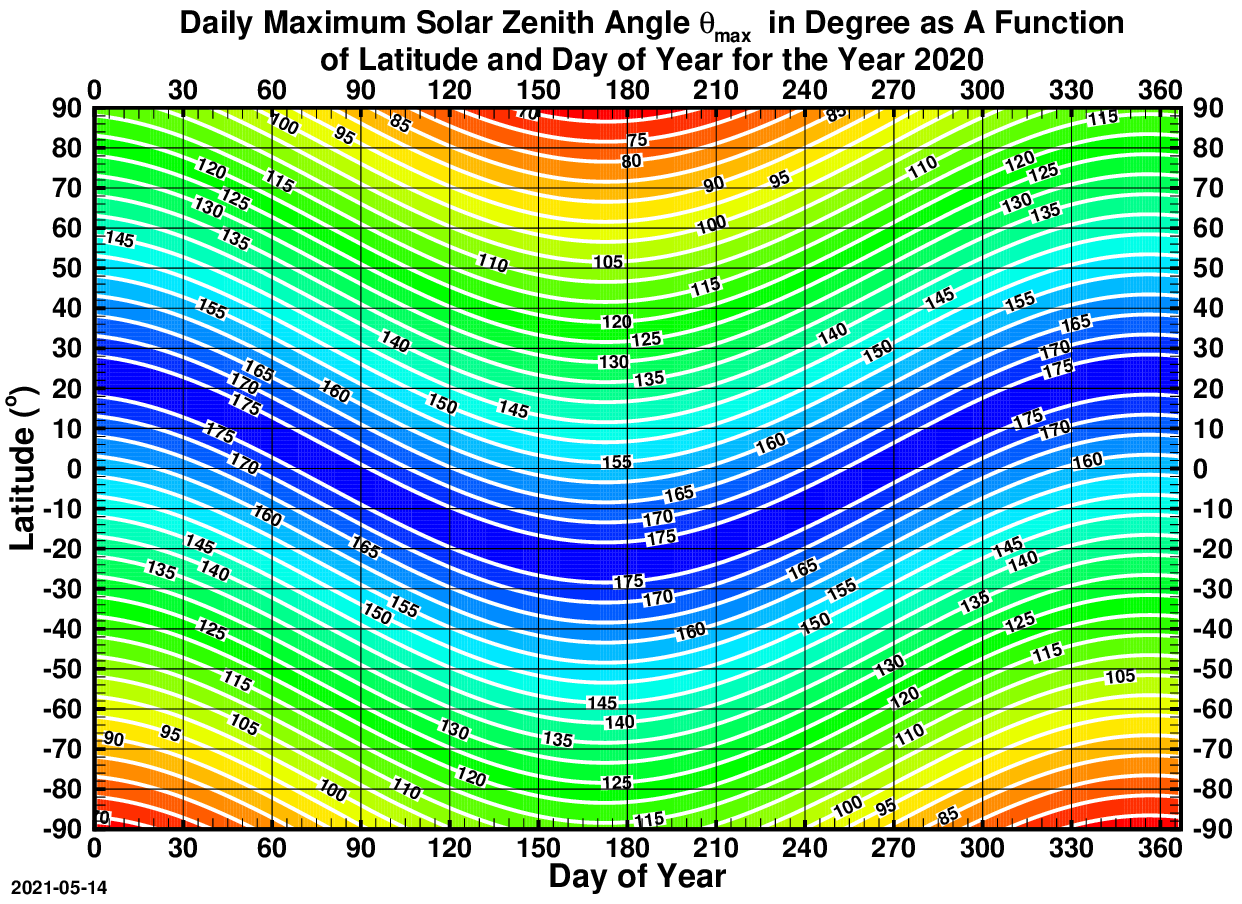
The blue zone indicates latitudes and dates within the example year 2020 where the sun is close to directly overhead (zenithal)

The solar equator is the latitude on Earth at which the Sun is observed directly overhead at midday. Due to the obliquity of Earth's axis, the solar equator varies during the year, from the Tropic of Capricorn on the December solstice to the Tropic of Cancer on the June solstice. On the day of either equinox, the Sun's position is at the zenith when viewed from the geographic equator. The Sun can never be observed directly overhead from outside the tropics.

== See also ==
- Thermal equator
- Subsolar point
