= Équateur (film) =

1983 French film directed by Serge Gainsbourg

- Directed by: Serge Gainsbourg
- Written by: Serge Gainsbourg; Georges Simenon
- Based on: Tropic Moon by Georges Simenon
- Produced by: Charles Mensah; Alain Poiré
- Starring: Francis Huster
- Cinematography: Willy Kurant
- Edited by: Babeth Si Ramdane
- Music by: Serge Gainsbourg
- Distributed by: Gaumont Distribution
- Release date: 17 August 1983
- Running time: 85 minutes
- Countries: France; West Germany; Gabon
- Languages: French; German

Équateur ([e.kwa.tœʁ], "Equator") is a 1983 French drama film directed by Serge Gainsbourg, starring Francis Huster. Based on a 1933 novel by Belgian writer Georges Simenon, it was screened out of competition at the 1983 Cannes Film Festival.

== Plot ==
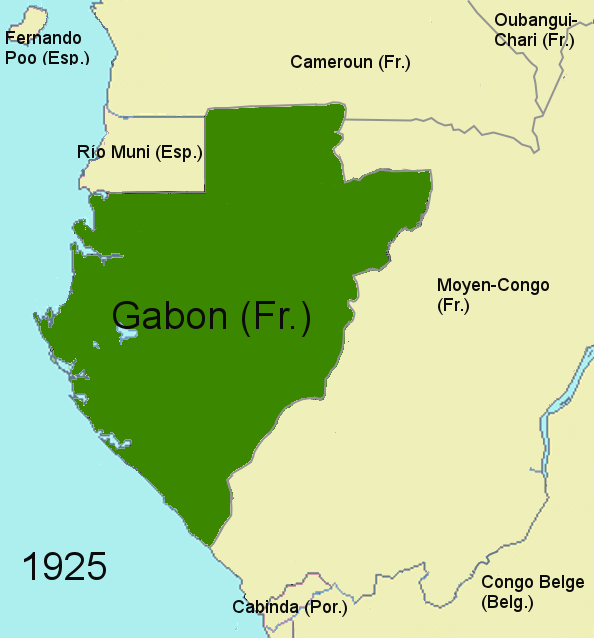
Map of French Gabon at the time Équateur is set

The film is set in Gabon in the 1930s, then part of French Equatorial Africa. A Frenchman comes to Libreville to work for a timber company; he falls for a mysterious white woman who is involved with a murder.

== Cast ==
- Francis Huster – Timar
- Barbara Sukowa – Adele
- Reinhard Kolldehoff – Eugene Schneider
- François Dyrek – Superintendent
- Jean Bouise – Public prosecutor
- Julien Guiomar – Bouilloux
- Roland Blanche – one-eyed man
- Murray Gronwall – the forester
- Stéphane Bouy – the pedlar
- Franck-Olivier Bonnet – the man from Lyon

== Production ==
Équateur was based on the 1933 novel Le Coup de lune (Tropic Moon) by Georges Simenon.

It was written and directed by Serge Gainsbourg, who also composed the music. Cinematography was by Willy Kurant.

The film was produced by Gabonese filmmaker Charles Mensah and French producer Alain Poiré.

== Release ==
Équateur was screened out of competition at the 1983 Cannes Film Festival.

It was also an official selection at the 1983 Locarno International Film Festival and 1984 Göteborg Film Festival.

== Accolades ==
The film was nominated for the Best Music Award at the 1984 César Awards.
