= Philippe Mory =

Gabonese actor, director (1935–2016)

- Born: 1935
- Died: 7 June 2016 (aged 80–81); Libreville, Gabon
- Occupations: Actor; Director
- Notable work: The Cage (1963); Les tam-tams se sont tus (1972)

Philippe Mory (1935 – 7 June 2016) was a Gabonese actor and director. He is known for acting in the films The Cage and One Does Not Bury Sunday (1960), and directing Les tam-tams se sont tus (1972).

== Early life ==
Philippe Mory was born in 1935.

== Career ==
Mory began his film career in the mid-1950s with his role in the short film Afrique-sur-Seine directed by Paulin Soumanou Vieyra. He is the principal interpreter of Michel Drach's feature film Do not Bury Sunday, which won the Louis-Delluc Prize in 1959.

He returned to Gabon, where he was the scriptwriter and one of the actors of The Cage directed by Robert Darène. The film was produced and shot in Gabon and was selected for the Cannes Film Festival in 1963.

Mory was incarcerated for three years from 1964 to 1967 because of his participation in the coup against the Leon Mba, Gabon's first President.

After his release, he participated in the creation of the Pan African Federation of Filmmakers (FEPACI) in 1970. He was also involved in the founding of the National Center of Gabonese Cinema (CENACI).

== Recognition and awards ==
Mory won the Golden Unicorn for Career Achievement at Amiens International Film Festival in the year 2011.

== Death ==
Mory died on 7 June 2016 in Libreville, Gabon.

== Filmography ==
=== As an actor ===
- La rue des bouches peintes - 1955
- No Burials on Sunday (1960)
- The Fruit Is Ripe - 1961
- The Cage - 1963 (Credited for writing in the film)
- Les tam-tams se sont tus - 1972
- Djogo - 2002
- Le silence de la forêt - 2003
- Inspecteur Sori: Le mamba (TV series) - 2005
- L'ombre de Liberty - 2006
- Le mystère Joséphine (TV series) - 2009
- Héritage perdu - 2010
- Le collier du Makoko - 2013

=== As director ===
- Les tam-tams se sont tus - 1972
