= Equi =

Equi, genitive singular and nominative plural of Latin word "equus" meaning horse, may also refer to:

- Aequi, an ancient people of central Italy

== People ==
- Elaine Equi (born 1953), an American poet
- Marie Equi (1872–1952), an American medical doctor and anarchist

== Places ==
- Equi Terme, part of the Italian comune Fivizzano, in the province of Massa and Carrara, in Tuscany

== See also ==
- Equis (disambiguation)
- Equus (disambiguation)
- S. equi (disambiguation)
