= EQU =

EQU or Equ may refer to:

- Equuleus (IAU abbreviation Equ), a northern star constellation
- Air Equator, (ICAO airline designator EQU) a former airline based in the Maldives from 2003 to 2005
- Equestrian at the Summer Olympics (IOC discipline code EQU), a series of horse-based sports competitions
- EQU, an abbreviation used to mean equative in interlinear translations; see List of glossing abbreviations
- Equ Press, an imprint of the OmniScriptum publishing group

== See also ==
- Equation, the concept of two mathematical objects having the same value
- EQ (disambiguation)
- Equus (disambiguation)
