= Rock shelter of the Equi Spa =

Rock shelter in the Apuan Alps, Italy

Coordinates: 44°10′00″N 10°09′09″E

Rock Shelter of the Equi Spa
- Grotte di Equi Terme
- View of the hamlet of Equi Terme from the La Buca balcony

- Location within Italy
- Type: Rock shelter / cave site
- Cultures: Prehistoric (various phases)
- Location: Equi Terme, Apuan Alps, Tuscany, Italy
- Region: Northern Tuscany

History
- Built: Prehistoric occupation

Site notes
- Excavation dates: 1909; 1930s–1940s
- Archaeologists: Carlo de Stefani
- Condition: Preserved (partly excavated)
- Public access: Yes (tourist attraction)

The rock shelter of the Equi Spa (Italian: Grotte di Equi Terme) is located on the northern fringe of the Apuan Alps, not far from the famous Carrara marble quarries in northern Italy. The rock shelter is located by the small hamlet of Equi Terme, which is a currently developing as a tourist attraction with three selling points: an archaeological site (Italian: La Tecchia), a natural cave system (Italian: La Buca) and a hiking trail along the northern fringe of the Apuan Alps (Italian: Solco).

== Archaeology ==
The rock shelter was first excavated in 1909 by the law graduate turned geologist and archaeologist Carlo deStefani, who published the first monograph of the archaeological and palaeozoological remains of the site in 1917. Further excavations were conducted in the 1930s and 1940s, turning the rock shelter into a cave, thanks to the large quantity of soil excavated.
