= Equis =

Equis may refer to:

- EFMD Quality Improvement System (or EQUIS), an international system of assessment and accreditation of higher education institutions in management and business administration run by the European Foundation for Management Development
- Equis International (or Equis) a Thomson Reuters software company which produces technical analysis software used in stock markets
- Equis, album by Uruguayan rock band Snake
- Equis, the Spanish name for X
