= S. equi =

S. equi may refer to:

- Sarcoptes equi, a mite species found on horses
- Streptococcus equi, the strangles or equine distemper, a bacterium species causing a contagious, upper respiratory tract infection of horses and other equines

== See also ==
- Equi (disambiguation)
