= Snake (band) =

- Origin: Montevideo, Uruguay
- Genres: Rock, Pop
- Years active: 1995–present
- Label: Bizarro Records
- Members: Marcelo Fontanini; Mikael Boudakian; Claudio Pintos; Mape Bossio
- Past members: Alejandro Moumdjian; Armen "Lalo" Keoroglian; Miguel Bestard; Federico Navarro
- Website: Snake.com.uy

Snake is an Uruguayan rock band formed in 1995 in Montevideo, Uruguay. It is considered one of the most popular rock bands in Uruguay, in the country's Latin rock scene.

== Band members ==
Founding members The founding members were all Armenian-Uruguayans. They were:

- Mikael Boudakian - bass
- Armen "Lalo" Keoroglian - drums
- Alejandro Moumdjian - guitar

After a long stay, Moumdjian was replaced by guitarists Miguel Bestard and Federico Navarro and the drummer Keoroglian was replaced by Mape Bossio.

Other past members

- Miguel Bestard - guitar
- Federico Navarro - guitar

Current members are

- Marcelo Fontanini - vocals
- Mikael Boudakian - bass guitar
- Claudio Pintos - guitar
- Mape Bossio - drums

== Career ==
In December 2000, Snake released their debut album named Dos Pasajes Paramarte produced by Juan Campodónico and Carlos Casacuberta and edited independently, which was soon broadcast on Uruguayan radios, making it one of the most popular Uruguayan rock bands. In September 2001, Snake performed in Buenos Aires, Argentina with a great response. In May 2002, they toured the United States including a big concert in Los Angeles at the Roxy Theatre. In August of the same year, the Snake song "Suicida" was included in the compilation that was published for LAMC, a conference held in 2002 in New York, in which the annual revelations of Latin Rock were highlighted.

Returning triumphant to Montevideo, Snake launched their second video clip "Equis" in May 2003 during the Premios Graffiti (the main annual awards event of Uruguayan music) winnings "best music video of the year" with "Suicida" being played on rotation on MTV. Snake toured Argentina again in 2003 in addition to taking part in 2003-2004 in several big music festivals for the Latin rock scene.

In August 2004, Snake recorded their second album this time through studios in Buenos . The album Dejando Marcas was produced by Raúl and Osko Cariola (from Santos Innocentes) in co-production with Mikael Boudakian. being "Magnéticos" was the first single from the album. A second single, "Mordiendo la Ciudad" was also issued as a music video directed by Federico Alvarez. With rising popularity, they were featured at many important festivals including Pilsen Rock in Paysandú, Uruguay (150,000 attendants), Fiesta X (main venue carrying 23,000 people and at Baradero Rock in Argentina in 2005 also celebrating the band's 10th anniversary with a concert in "Central" Montevideo in the "Snake 10" show singing their best iconic songs in addition to a special version of The Beatles "Taxman" in Spanish. They also appeared in Gesell Rock festival in Argentina in 2006 and 2007 and in Bahia Rock Festival in La Paloma, Rocha, Uruguay in 2008. On 30 May 2008, they appeared in their show at Teatro Metro, Montevideo. In 2009, Snake held a concert at Kibon Beach in Pocitos, Montevideo for about 5,000 people.

In 2009, Snake released their fourth album El Diario de la Serpiente co-produced by Raul and Osko Cariola. The single "Ataque de pánico!" was released in November 2009. The music video was based on the famous short film by Fede Álvarez and was directed and animated by Álvarez and Mauro Rondán. It took two years to finalize. The music video as a theme of the short film is cataloged as arguably the best video clip in the history of national Uruguayan rock. Another release from the album was "Los Antídotos". In 2009, long-standing member Alejandro Moumdjian left the band at the height of the band's success. The band has seen since a number of changes in the line-up.

On 9 October 2013, Snake opened for Aerosmith on the occasion of the first tour of Aerosmith in Uruguay. place on 09/10/2013 at the Centenario Montevideo stadium with approximately 22,000 people attending.

== Discography ==
=== Albums ===
- 2000: Dos Pasajes Paramarte
- 2004: Dejando Marcas
- 2006: Snake 10
- 2009: El Diario de la Serpiente

=== Singles ===
- 2001: "Suicida" ("LAMC")
- 2002: "Equis".
- 2007: "Mordiendo la Ciudad"
- 2009: "Ataque de pánico!"

=== Music videos ===
- "Suicida "(2000)
- "Equis" (2002) (Graffiti Award)
- "Mordiendo la Ciudad" (2007)
- " Ya no hay tiempo "
- "Ataque de pánico!" (2009) (Graffiti Award)
