= Air Equator =

IATA	ICAO	Call sign
-	EQU	Air Equator
- Founded: 2003; 23 years ago
- Ceased operations: 2005; 21 years ago
- Hubs: Gan International Airport
- Focus cities: Malé
- Fleet size: 2
- Destinations: 4
- Parent company: A.Faiz/A.Murthy (60%) Ziaf Enterprises Maldives (40%)
- Headquarters: Hithadhoo, Maldives

Air Equator was an airline based in Gan, Maldives. It operated services linking the southernmost island of Gan to other main islands in the Maldives. Its main base was Gan International Airport. The airline ceased operations in August 2025. The airline had a fleet of 1 Fokker F27 and a Fokker F50 which was returned in 2004. The F27 had been used till the airline stopped operations

== History ==
The airline was established in 2003 and received its air operator's certificate on 10 October 2004 from the Maldives Civil Aviation Department. It started operations on 15 October 2004 with flights from Gan to the capital Malé. It is owned by A Faiz/A Murthy (60%) and Ziaf Enterprises Maldives (40%). Subsequently, majority shares were purchased by SPA Aviation of Sri Lanka. The Airline operations were affected during the Asian tsunami in December 2004 and flew some relief material to affected islands. The Airline was chartered by the media and press accompanying the Turkish Prime Minister when he visited the Maldives for surveying the damage done by the tsunami. The airline discontinued all flights in May 2005 and finally ceased operations in August 2005 after disagreement between SPA Aviation and A. Faiz on financial and administrative control. Capt. Anup Murthy was the GM/CEO of the company and the Maldives CAD approved Accountable Manager for the company from inception. SPA Aviation had plans for reviving the Airline but could not do so as their source of funding did not materialize, till press time early 2006.

== Destinations ==
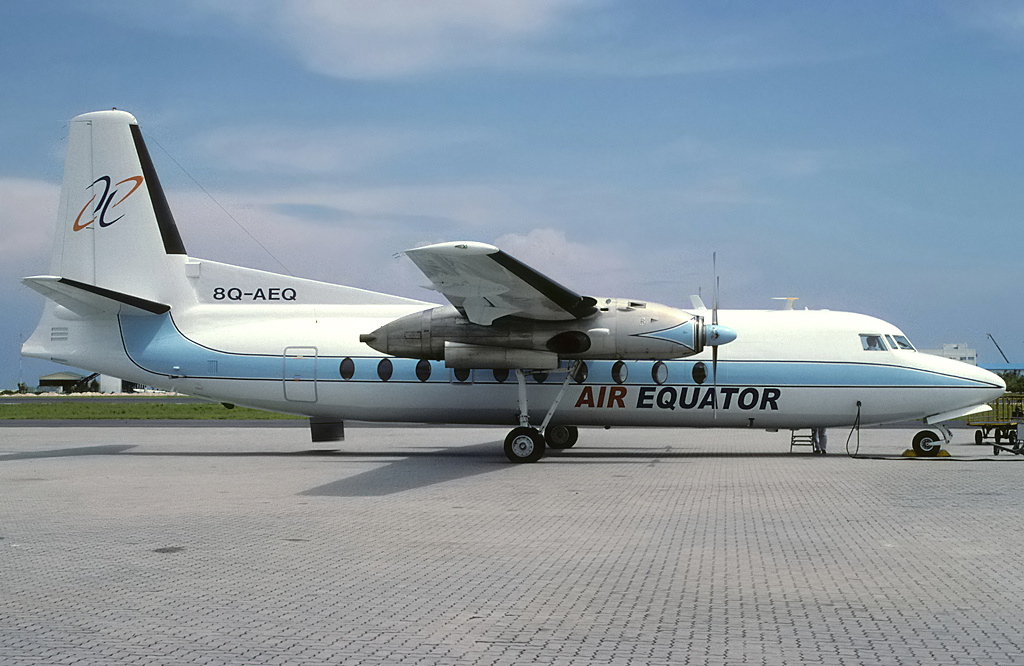
Air Equator's sole Fairchild F-27F at Malé International Airport (November 2004)

Air Equator operated services to the following domestic scheduled destinations (at January 2005):

- Gan (ceased operations)
- Hanimaadhoo (ceased operations)
- Kaadedhdhoo (ceased operations)
- Malé. (ceased operations)

== Fleet ==
The Air Equator fleet consisted of 1 Fairchild F-27 aircraft (at January 2005). The aircraft still rests in the airline's livery on a grassy area near the Gan International Airport.
