= Spanish orthography =

System for writing in Spanish

Spanish alphabet Alfabeto español
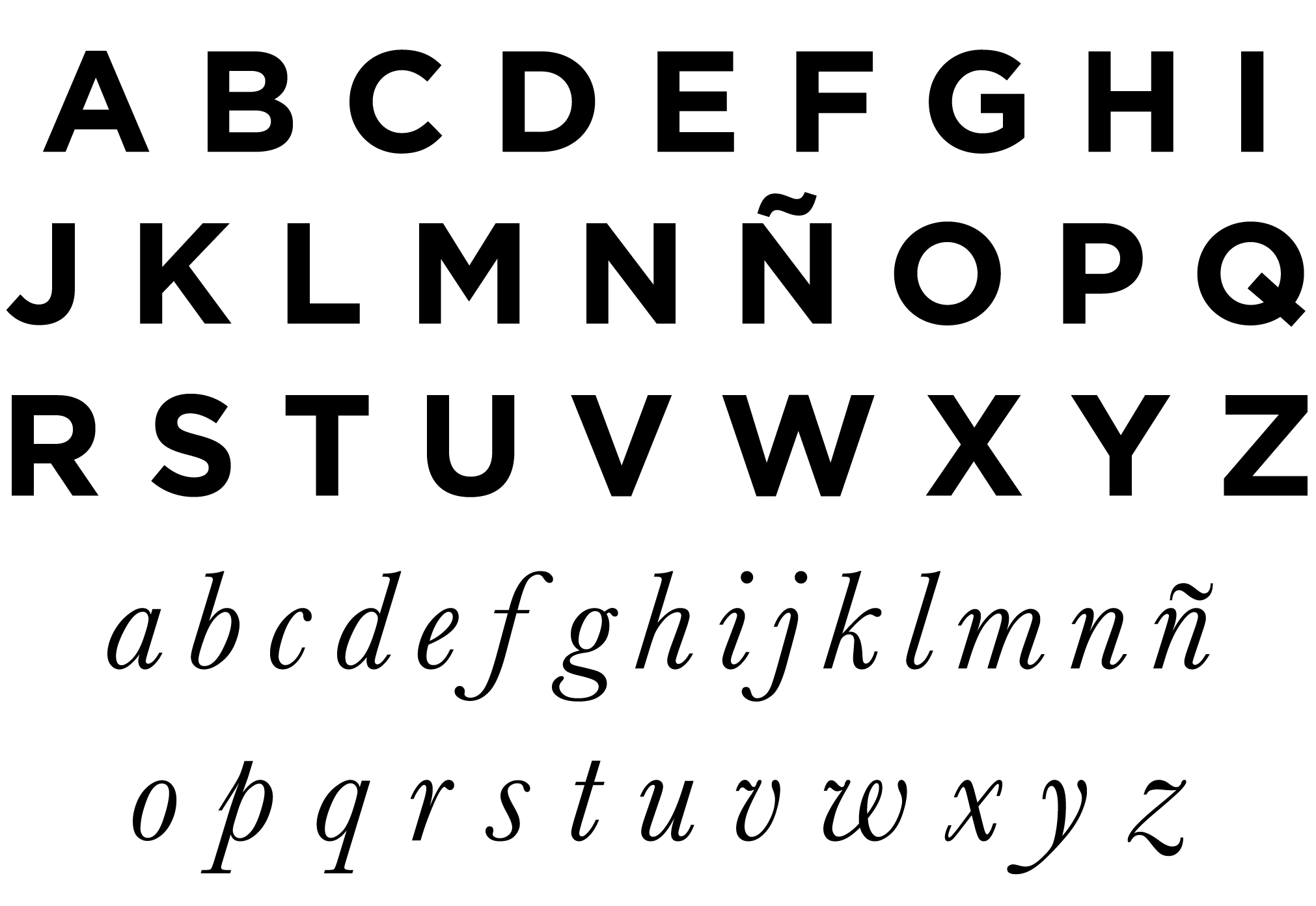
- Script type: Alphabet
- Period: c. 16th century – present
- Official script: Spain; Argentina; Bolivia; Chile; Colombia; Costa Rica; Cuba; Dominican Republic; Ecuador; El Salvador; Equatorial Guinea; Guatemala; Honduras; Mexico; Nicaragua; Panama; Paraguay; Peru; Puerto Rico; Sahrawi Arab Democratic Republic; Uruguay; Venezuela
- Languages: Spanish

Related scripts
- Parent systems: Egyptian hieroglyphs: Proto-Sinaitic script; Phoenician alphabet; Greek alphabet; Old Italic script; Latin script; Spanish alphabet

Spanish orthography is the orthography used in the Spanish language. The alphabet uses the Latin script. The spelling is fairly phonemic, especially in comparison to more opaque orthographies like English, having a relatively consistent mapping of graphemes to phonemes; in other words, the pronunciation of a given Spanish-language word can largely be predicted from its spelling and to a slightly lesser extent vice versa. Spanish punctuation uniquely includes the use of inverted question and exclamation marks: ⟨¿⟩ ⟨¡⟩.

Like other Romance languages, Spanish uses capital letters much less often than English; they are not used on adjectives derived from proper nouns (e.g. francés, español, portugués from Francia, España, and Portugal, respectively) and book titles capitalize only the first word (e.g. La rebelión de las masas).

Spanish uses only the acute accent over any vowel: ⟨á é í ó ú⟩. This accent is used to mark the tonic (stressed) syllable, though it may also be used occasionally to distinguish homophones such as si 'if' and sí 'yes'. The only other diacritics used are the tilde on the letter ⟨ñ⟩, which is considered a separate letter from ⟨n⟩, and the diaeresis used in the sequences ⟨güe⟩ and ⟨güi⟩—as in bilingüe 'bilingual'—to indicate that the ⟨u⟩ is pronounced [w], rather than having the usual silent role that it plays in unmarked ⟨gue⟩ [ɡe ~ ɣe] and ⟨gui⟩ [ɡi ~ ɣi].

Unlike English, Spanish has an official body that governs linguistic rules, orthography among them: the Royal Spanish Academy (Real Academia Española; RAE), which makes periodic changes to the orthography. Its currently valid work on orthography is the Ortografía de la lengua española, published in 2010.

== Alphabet in Spanish ==
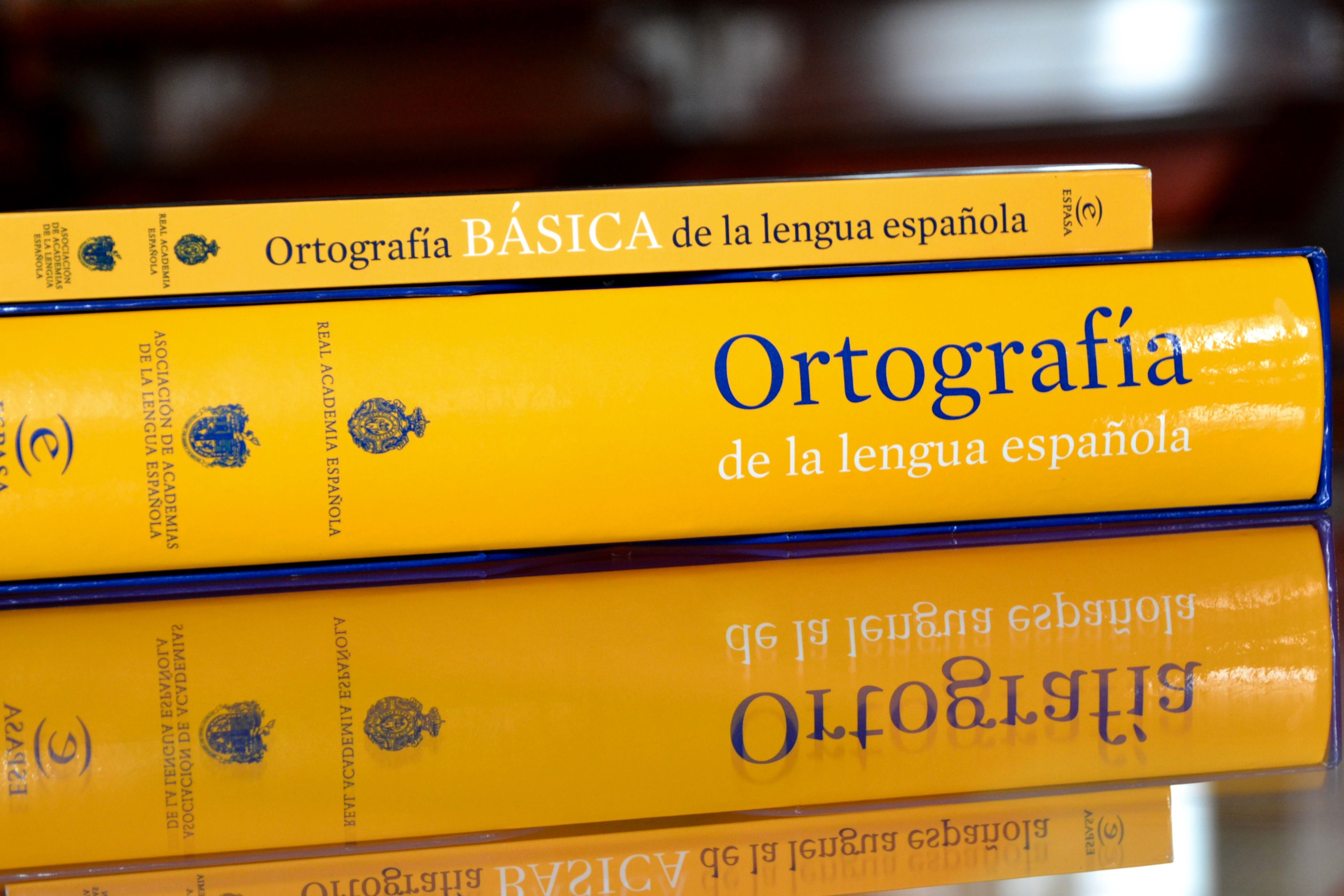
Ortografía de la lengua española (2010)

The Spanish language is written using the Spanish alphabet, which is the ISO Latin script with one additional letter, eñe ⟨ñ⟩, for a total of 27 letters. Although the letters ⟨k⟩ and ⟨w⟩ are part of the alphabet, they appear only in loanwords (such as karate, kilo, waterpolo and wolframio) and in sensational spellings (such as okupa and bakalao). Each letter has a single official name according to the RAE's new 2010 Common Orthography, but in some regions alternative names are used.

There are five digraphs: ⟨ch⟩ ("che" or "ce hache"), ⟨ll⟩ ("elle" or "doble ele"), ⟨rr⟩ ("doble erre"), ⟨gu⟩ ("ge u") and ⟨qu⟩ ("cu u"). While che and elle were each formerly treated as a single letter, in 1994 the tenth congress of the Association of Academies of the Spanish Language agreed to alphabetize ⟨ch⟩ and ⟨ll⟩ as ordinary sequences of letters. Spain requested the change at the behest of UNESCO and the European Union, in an effort to facilitate translation and computing. Thus, for example, in dictionaries, chico is alphabetized after centro and before ciudad, instead of being alphabetized after all words beginning with cu- as was formerly done. Despite their former status as unitary letters of the alphabet, ⟨ch⟩ and ⟨ll⟩ have always been treated as sequences with regard to the rules of capitalization. Thus the word chillón in a text written in all caps is CHILLÓN, not *ChILlÓN, and if it is the first word of a sentence, it is written Chillón, not *CHillón. Sometimes, one finds lifts with buttons marked LLamar, but this double capitalization has always been incorrect according to RAE rules.

When acute accent and diaeresis marks are used on vowels (⟨á⟩, ⟨é⟩, ⟨í⟩, ⟨ó⟩, ⟨ú⟩ and ⟨ü⟩), they are considered variants of the plain vowel letters. The consonant ⟨ñ⟩ is considered a separate letter from ⟨n⟩. This makes a difference when sorting alphabetically: ⟨ñ⟩ appears in dictionaries after ⟨n⟩.

From most to least frequent, letters used in Spanish texts are: ⟨E A O S R N I D L C T U M P B G V Y Q H F Z J Ñ X W K⟩; (Note: The eñe is added in the fourth to last position according to the Quixote gutenberg.org.) vowels make up around 45% of the text.

Letter	Name	Phoneme(s)
A a	a	/a/
B b	be, be larga, be alta	/b/
C c	ce	/k/, /θ/~/s/ (Note: The phonemes /θ/ and /s/ are not distinguished in most dialects; see seseo.)
Ch ch (Note: The digraph ⟨ch⟩ represents the affricate /tʃ/. The digraph was formerly treated as a single letter, called che.)	che	/tʃ/
D d	de	/d/
E e	e	/e/
F f	efe	/f/
G g	ge	/ɡ/, /x/
H h	hache	silent (Note: With the exception of some loanwords: hámster, hachís, hawaiano, which have /x/.), /h/
I i	i	/i/, /j/
J j	jota	/x/
K k	ka	/k/
L l	ele	/l/
Ll ll	elle	/ʎ/~/ʝ/ (Note: The digraph ⟨ll⟩ (e.g. calle) represents the palatal lateral /ʎ/ in a few dialects; but in most dialects—because of the historical merger called yeísmo—it, like the letter ⟨y⟩, represents the phoneme /ʝ/.)
M m	eme	/m/, /n/ (Note: The exact realization of nasals in syllable-final position depends on phonetic attributes of following consonants (even across word boundaries) so that ⟨n⟩ can represent a nasal that is labial (as in ánfora), palatal (as in cónyuge), velar (as in rincón), etc. In rare instances, word-final ⟨m⟩ is used, but there is no actual pronunciation difference.)
N n	ene	/n/, /m/, /ɲ/
Ñ ñ	eñe	/ɲ/
O o	o	/o/
P p	pe	/p/
Q q	cu	/k/ (Note: Used only in the digraph ⟨qu⟩.)
R r (Note: The digraph ⟨rr⟩, which only appears between vowels, represents the trill /r/.)	erre	/r/, /ɾ/
Rr rr	doble erre, erre doble	/r/
S s	ese	/s/
T t	te	/t/
U u	u	/u/, /w/
V v	uve, ve, ve corta, ve baja, ve chica	/b/
W w	uve doble, ve doble, doble ve, doble u	/w/, /b/
X x	equis	/gs/, /s/ (Note: Old orthography with the letter ⟨x⟩ representing /x/ or /ʃ/ has been preserved in some proper names such as México.)
Y y	ye, i griega	/ʝ/, /i/
Z z	zeta	/θ/~/s/

=== Alternative names ===
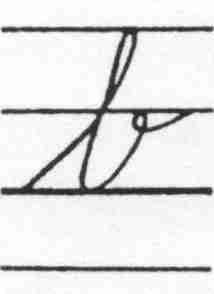
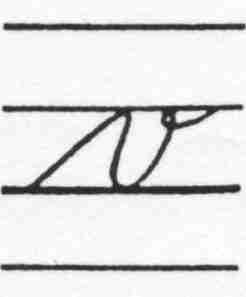
The be/be larga/grande/alta and uve/ve corta/chica/baja in blackletter and cursive scripts

B and V
The letters ⟨b⟩ and ⟨v⟩ were originally simply known as be and ve, which in modern Spanish are pronounced identically. In Old Spanish, they likely represented different sounds, but the sounds merged later. Their usual names are be and uve; in some regions, speakers may instead add something to the names to distinguish them. Some Mexicans and most Peruvians generally say be grande / be chica ('big B' / 'little V'); Argentines, Uruguayans and Chileans, be larga / be corta ('long B' / 'short V'). Some people give examples of words spelled with the letter; e.g., b de burro / v de vaca ('b as in burro' / 'v as in vaca'); Colombians tend to say be grande for B and ve pequeña for V. In Venezuela, they call B b de Bolívar and V v de Venezuela, or be alta and ve baja ('tall B' / 'short V'). Regardless of these regional differences, all Spanish-speaking people recognize be as the official name of B.
R
The digraph ⟨rr⟩ is sometimes called doble erre or erre doble. It is sometimes suggested that the name of the letter ⟨r⟩ be ere when it is single, and erre when it is double, but the dictionary of the Real Academia Española defines the name of ⟨r⟩ as erre. Ere is considered obsolete. The name ere was used when referring specifically to the alveolar tap /ɾ/ and erre referring to the alveolar trill /r/. The two contrast between vowels, with the latter being represented with ⟨rr⟩, but the sounds are otherwise in complementary distribution so that a single ⟨r⟩ may represent either.
W
In Hispanic American Spanish, ⟨w⟩ is sometimes called doble ve, ve doble, or doble uve. In Colombia, Mexico, and in some Central American countries, because of English acculturation, the letter is usually called doble u (like English "double u"). In Spain, it is usually called uve doble.
I
Because of its origin, ⟨i⟩ is occasionally known as i latina ("Latin i") to distinguish it from ⟨y⟩, which is known as i griega ("Greek i").
Y
The most common name for ⟨y⟩ in Spain is i griega, but it has been commonly superseded in Hispanic American Spanish by ye in an effort to standardize on a one-word name, as opposed to a name consisting of two words. Using ye as the only name for the letter is one of the newest proposed changes specified by the 2010 new common orthography.
Z
The name for ⟨z⟩ is zeta (formerly also spelled ceta, pronounced the same). In older Spanish, it was called zeda or ceda, and the diminutive form of this word, cedilla, is now used in both Spanish and English to refer to the diacritic mark exhibited in the letter ⟨ç⟩.

=== Other characters ===
Besides the letters, other characters are specially associated with Spanish-language texts:

- The currency symbols of Spanish-language countries: ⟨¢⟩ (centavo), ⟨₡⟩ (colón), ⟨₧⟩ (peseta), ⟨$⟩ (peso), ⟨₲⟩ (Paraguayan guaraní).
- ⟨℆⟩, abbreviation of cada uno or cada una ('each one')
- ⟨º⟩ and ⟨ª⟩ are used in abbreviations like 1.º, 1.ª (primero, 'first') or D.ª ("doña"); in ordinal numbers they match the grammatical gender of the noun being modified: masculine ⟨º⟩ and feminine ⟨ª⟩. N.º (número, 'number') can be represented as one character ⟨№⟩.
- ⟨@⟩ is the symbol of the arroba, a pre-metric unit of weight (about 11.502 kg, 25.3 pounds).
- ⟨¿⟩ and ⟨¡⟩ are used at the beginning of interrogative and exclamatory sentences, respectively. They are also used in the middle of a sentence if only part of the sentence is a question or exclamation: Spanish: Juan se puso a comer y ¡recórcholis! ("John started eating and wow!")
- The guillemets (Spanish: comillas) ⟨«⟩ and ⟨»⟩ are used in formal settings in the same sense as quotation marks, although they are very uncommon in informal usage.

== Orthography ==
=== Orthographic principles ===
Spanish orthographic rules are similar, but not identical, to those of other Romance languages of the Iberian Peninsula, such as Portuguese, Catalan and Galician.

In general, the orthography of Spanish is such that the pronunciation of most words is unambiguous given their written form. The main exception is the letter ⟨x⟩, which usually represents /ks~ɡs/ (or /s/ at the beginning of a word and, for some speakers, before consonants), but it can also occasionally represent /x/, /ʃ/ or (noninitially) /s/, particularly in names of North American places and cuisine (e.g. México /ˈme.xi.ko/; mixiote /miˈʃjo.te/; Mixco /ˈmis.ko/, pronounced so even by speakers who normally pronounce /ks~ɡs/ before consonants) and in some traditional spellings of personal names dating from Old Spanish (e.g. Ximénez /xiˈme.neθ/~/xiˈme.nes/).

The converse does not always hold—for a given pronunciation there may be multiple possible spellings, as a result of decisions by the RAE. The main issues are:

- use of both ⟨b⟩ and ⟨v⟩ for /b/
- use of both ⟨j⟩ and ⟨g⟩ for /x/ before ⟨e⟩ and ⟨i⟩
- silent ⟨h⟩
- occasional use of differential accents to distinguish two words that sound the same, such as tú / tu, sí / si, and más / mas

For some speakers, additional problems may come from:

- use of ⟨y⟩ and ⟨ll⟩ (yeísmo)
  - use of ⟨y⟩ / ⟨ll⟩, ⟨hi⟩ and (less commonly) ⟨i⟩ as part of a rising diphthong at the beginning of words (variant of yeísmo); (Note: The distinction is usually preserved in dialects with sheísmo or zheísmo (such as Rioplatense Spanish), in which word-initial ⟨y⟩ and ⟨ll⟩ are pronounced [ʃ] or [ʒ], while ⟨hi⟩ and ⟨i⟩ are pronounced [j]. Additionally, some speakers pronounce certain ⟨hi-⟩ words with a hiatus, thus making them distinct from ⟨y-⟩ words; for example, hierba can be pronounced with either a diphthong (/ˈʝeɾ.ba/) or a hiatus (/i.ˈeɾ.ba/). However, this varies by region, and does not apply to all ⟨hi-⟩ words (e.g. hierro is never pronounced with a hiatus).)
- use of ⟨s⟩ and ⟨z⟩ (as well as ⟨c⟩ and ⟨sc⟩ before ⟨e⟩ and ⟨i⟩), either for /s/ (seseo) or for /θ/ (ceceo)
- use of ⟨x⟩ (also ⟨xs⟩ in a few prefixed words) and the letter combinations ⟨cc⟩ and ⟨xc⟩ before ⟨e⟩ and ⟨i⟩, either for /ks~ɡs/ (seseo) or for /kθ~ɡθ/ (ceceo)
- use of ⟨hu⟩, ⟨gu⟩ and ⟨bu⟩ before a vowel for /w/;
- use of both ⟨s⟩ and ⟨x⟩ for /s/ before consonants (in a few Greek-derived words, ⟨x⟩ is used for word-initial /s/ from etymological ξ).

The use of ⟨b⟩ and ⟨v⟩, ⟨j⟩ and ⟨g⟩, and the silent ⟨h⟩ is mostly based on etymology. In particular, ⟨b⟩ in many cases is not a continuation of Old Spanish (which often had ⟨v⟩ in place of intervocalic ⟨b⟩ as a result of Vulgar Latin merger, as in other Romance languages), but an artificial restitution based on Latin: caballo 'horse' is spelled as Latin caballus and unlike French cheval, Italian cavallo, Portuguese cavalo, or Catalan cavall. The letter ⟨h⟩ is used in place of Latin ⟨h⟩ and ⟨f⟩ (in a few words also ⟨g⟩): hoy < hodie, hablar < fabulare, hermano < germanus. Additionally, ⟨h⟩ is a purely orthographical sign used before word-initial rising diphthongs. (Note: Modern words in which ⟨h⟩ is derived from Latin ⟨f⟩ (e.g. hacer, hablar) were spelled with ⟨f⟩, pronounced [f], in Old Spanish (e.g. fazer, fablar), and there was a transitional stage pronounced [h] before the sound was entirely lost; hence the modern spelling with ⟨h⟩. But in words derived from Latin words with ⟨h⟩ (e.g. hoy, prohibir), the letter was always silent in Spanish. And words beginning with either of the diphthongs [je] or [we] (e.g. hielo, huevo) were given an initial ⟨h⟩ in spelling (always silent) to ensure that their initial glide was not read as a consonant (in Old Spanish, the letters ⟨i⟩ and ⟨j⟩ were often interchanged, as were ⟨u⟩ and ⟨v⟩).) However, in some words RAE mandated counter-etymological spellings because of established tradition of usage, e.g. abogado < advocatus.

The Ortografía includes a series of "rules of thumb" on using the letters ⟨b/v⟩, ⟨g/j⟩, ⟨ll/y⟩, ⟨c/s/z⟩, ⟨h⟩, and ⟨x⟩. For example, verbs ending in -bir are spelled with ⟨b⟩, except hervir, servir, vivir, and their derivatives.

Use of different letters for the same sound
sound	before ⟨e / i⟩	elsewhere
/θ/ or /s/	⟨c⟩ (or ⟨z⟩ in some loanwords) or ⟨s⟩	⟨z⟩ or ⟨s⟩
/k/	⟨qu⟩ (or ⟨k⟩ in some loanwords)	⟨c⟩ (or ⟨k⟩ in some loanwords)
/x/	⟨g⟩ or ⟨j⟩ (or ⟨x⟩ in Mexico)	⟨j⟩ (or ⟨x⟩ in Mexico)
/ɡ/	⟨gu⟩	⟨g⟩
/ɡw/	⟨gü⟩	⟨gu⟩

In some Spanish verbs, the same stem is spelled differently before different verb endings. This is required to keep the regularity of the conjugated forms in terms of sound, when a letter represents different sounds, or to avoid unusual combinations, such as -ze- or -qua-:

- /k/: qu↔c: delinquir → delincamos (-quir); tocar → toquemos (-car).
- /θ/: c↔z: vencer → venzamos (-cer); gozar → gocemos (-zar).
- /ɡw/: gü↔gu: argüir → arguyamos (-güir); averiguar → averigüemos (-guar).
- /ɡ/: gu↔g: distinguir → distingamos (-guir); negar → neguemos (-gar).
- /x/: g→j: proteger → protejamos (-ger). But in verbs ending in -jar, the ⟨j⟩ is kept before ⟨e⟩: mojar → mojemos (not *mogemos).

The same occurs in other parts of speech when combined with certain suffixes, such as -ito / -ita for nouns and pronouns or -ísimo / -ísima for adjectives and adverbs: taza → tacita; poco → poquito; abrigo → abriguito; agua → agüita; feroz → ferocísimo; loco → loquísimo; largo → larguísimo; exiguo → exigüísimo. Likewise, nouns and adjectives ending in ⟨z⟩ change this letter to ⟨c⟩ in the plural for similar reasons: lápiz → lápices; feroz → feroces.

=== Letter-to-sound correspondences ===
==== Consonants ====
Consonants
Letter	Context	IPA	Examples	English approximation
b or v	word-initial after a pause, or after ⟨m⟩ or ⟨n⟩	[b]	bestia; embuste; vaca; envidia	practically the same as the typical English ⟨b⟩, except that it is fully voiced; e.g. about
b or v	elsewhere (i.e. after a vowel, even across a word boundary, or after any consonant other than ⟨m⟩ or ⟨n⟩)	[β] (Note: /b/, /d/, /ʝ/ and /ɡ/ are approximants ([β̞], [ð̞], [ʝ̞] [ɣ̞]; represented here without the undertacks) in all places except after a pause, after [n] or [m], or—in the case of [d] and [ʝ]—after [l], in which contexts they are stops [b], [d], [ɟʝ], [ɡ], not dissimilar from English ⟨b⟩, ⟨d⟩, ⟨j⟩, ⟨g⟩.)	bebé; obtuso; vivir; curva; mi bebé; mi vaca	between baby and bevy (like the typical English ⟨v⟩, but with both lips instead of with the upper teeth)
b or v	rare: ⟨v⟩ at the end of loanwords	[f]	leitmotiv; lev; molotov	same as the typical English ⟨f⟩; e.g. face
c	before ⟨e⟩ or ⟨i⟩	[θ] (central and northern Spain) or [s] (most other regions) (Note: In Andalusia, Canary Islands, and Spanish America [θ] is not distinguished from [s]; see seseo.)	cereal; encima	same as the English voiceless ⟨th⟩ (as in thing) in central and northern Spain, or the typical English ⟨s⟩ (as in sass) in all other regions
c	before voiced consonants	[ɣ]	anécdota	a sound between a light English ⟨g⟩ and the typical English ⟨h⟩ (between gold and ahold)
c	elsewhere	[k]	casa; claro; vaca; escudo	same as certain instances of English ⟨k⟩ or ⟨c⟩; e.g. skull, scan, or picking (unaspirated, i.e. without the puff of air that accompanies English /k/ at the beginning of a word, e.g. in can)
ch	everywhere (Note: In a small number of borrowed words, such as Kirchner, this is [ʃ].)	[tʃ] or [ʃ] (depending upon the dialect)	ocho; chícharo	same as the typical English ⟨ch⟩; church
d	word-initial after a pause, or after ⟨l⟩ or ⟨n⟩	[d]	dedo; cuando; aldaba	practically the same as the typical English ⟨d⟩, except that it is fully voiced and the tip of the tongue touches the upper teeth; e.g. adore
d	elsewhere	[ð]	dádiva; arder; admirar; mi dedo; verdad	same as the typical English voiced ⟨th⟩; e.g. this
f	before voiced consonants	[v]	afgano; Afganistán	same as the typical English ⟨v⟩; e.g. vase
f	elsewhere	[f]	fase; café	same as the typical English ⟨f⟩; e.g. face
g	before ⟨e⟩ or ⟨i⟩	[x] or [h]	general	similar to a "strong" English ⟨h⟩-sound (e.g. the ⟨ch⟩ in Scottish loch) or glottal ⟨h⟩ (as in heaven)
g	not before ⟨e⟩ or ⟨i⟩, and either word-initial after a pause, or after ⟨n⟩	[ɡ]	gato; grande; vengo	practically the same as the typical English ⟨g⟩ sound, except that it is fully voiced; e.g. ago
g	not before ⟨e⟩ or ⟨i⟩, and not in the above contexts	[ɣ]	trigo; amargo; signo; mi gato	a sound between a light English ⟨g⟩ and the typical English ⟨h⟩ (between gold and ahold)
gu	before ⟨a⟩ or ⟨o⟩, and either word-initial after a pause, or after ⟨n⟩	[ɡw]	guante; lengua	a sound like the ⟨gu⟩ in English language
gu	before ⟨a⟩ or ⟨o⟩, and not in the above contexts	[ɣw]	agua; averiguar	similar to the typical English ⟨w⟩, but preceded by a soft velar sound
gu	before ⟨e⟩ or ⟨i⟩, and either word-initial after a pause, or after ⟨n⟩	[ɡ]	guerra	practically the same as the typical English ⟨g⟩ sound, except that it is fully voiced; e.g. ago
gu	before ⟨e⟩ or ⟨i⟩, and not in the above contexts	[ɣ]	sigue	a sound between a light English ⟨g⟩ and the typical English ⟨h⟩ (between gold and ahold)
gü	before ⟨e⟩ or ⟨i⟩, and either word-initial after a pause, or after ⟨n⟩	[ɡw]	güero, pingüino	a sound like the ⟨gu⟩ in English penguin
gü	before ⟨e⟩ or ⟨i⟩, and not in the above contexts	[ɣw]	averigüe	similar to the typical English ⟨w⟩, but preceded by a soft velar sound
h	everywhere	(silent)	hoy; hacer; prohibir; huevo; hielo	silent (like English ⟨h⟩ in English honor or hour)
h	everywhere; occurs in loanwords and foreign proper names	[x] or [h]	hámster, hawaiano, hachís, yihad, haiku, dírham, Yokohama, Wahid (Note: However, many loanwords are pronounced without the original [h] sound, e. g. alcohol, hitita, hurra, hotentote, húsar, harakiri, hamaca.)	similar to a "strong" English ⟨h⟩-sound (e.g. the ⟨ch⟩ in Scottish loch) or glottal ⟨h⟩ (as in heaven)
hi	before a vowel	[j] or [ʝ]	hierba; hielo	similar to or the same as the typical English ⟨y⟩; e.g. you (but often more strongly pronounced, sometimes resembling the English ⟨j⟩, as in jam)
hu	before a vowel	[w] (sometimes [ɡw] or [bw])	hueso; huevo (Note: Some speakers may pronounce word-initial [w] with an epenthetic [ɡ], e.g. Huila [ˈɡwila]~[ˈwila].)	usually the same as the ⟨w⟩ in English we
j	everywhere	[x] or [h]	jamón; eje; reloj; (Note: For most speakers, the ⟨j⟩ is silent at the end of a word, in which case reloj is pronounced [reˈlo].)	similar to a "strong" English ⟨h⟩-sound (e.g. the ⟨ch⟩ in Scottish loch) or glottal ⟨h⟩ (as in heaven)
k	rare; only occurs in a few loanwords and sensational spellings	[k]	kilo, karate, okupa	same as certain instances of English ⟨k⟩ or ⟨c⟩; e.g. skull, scan, or picking (unaspirated, i.e. without the puff of air that accompanies English /k/ at the beginning of a word, e.g. in can)
l	everywhere	[l]	lino; alhaja; principal	same as the typical English ⟨l⟩; e.g. lake, lily (especially like the clear ⟨l⟩ at the beginning of a syllable in British English, rather than the dark ⟨l⟩ of American English)
ll	everywhere	[ʎ], [ʝ], [ʒ] or [ʃ] (depending upon the dialect)	llave; pollo	similar to the ⟨lli⟩ in English million (in some dialects simplified to a sound between the typical English ⟨y⟩ and ⟨j⟩, e.g. between yes and Jess)
m	everywhere except word-finally	[m]	madre; comer; campo (Note: The nasal consonants [n], [m], [ɲ] only contrast before vowels. Before consonants, they assimilate to the consonant's place of articulation. This is partially reflected in the orthography: only ⟨m⟩ is written before ⟨b⟩ and ⟨p⟩; but only ⟨n⟩ is written before ⟨v⟩ (although ⟨nv⟩ represents the same sounds as ⟨mb⟩) and ⟨f⟩. Word-finally, only [n] occurs, normally spelled ⟨n⟩; but ⟨m⟩ is used in some loanwords.)	same as the typical English ⟨m⟩; medal
m	word-final	[n] or [ŋ] (depending upon the dialect)	álbum	varying between the typical English ⟨n⟩ and ⟨ng⟩, e.g. the ⟨ng⟩ in English sing
n	word-final	[n] or [ŋ] (depending upon the dialect)	sin	varying between the typical English ⟨n⟩ and ⟨ng⟩, e.g. the ⟨ng⟩ in English sing
n	everywhere but before other consonants	[n]	nido; anillo; anhelo	same as the typical English ⟨n⟩; e.g. nun
n	before other consonants	[m] [ɱ] [n] [ɲ] [ŋ]	invierno confite mundo enyesar cinco	same as the typical English ⟨m⟩; imperfect same as the English ⟨m⟩ in symphony same as the typical English ⟨n⟩ (as in nun) same as the English ⟨ny⟩ in canyon same as the typical English ⟨ng⟩ (as in sink or sing)
ñ	everywhere	[ɲ] or [nj] (depending upon the dialect)	ñandú; cabaña	roughly like minion
p	everywhere	[p]	pozo; topo; esposa	same as certain instances of English ⟨p⟩; e.g. span or typing (unaspirated, i.e. without the puff of air that accompanies English /p/ at the beginning of a word, e.g. in pan)
p	in the consonant cluster ⟨pt⟩	[β]	optimista	between baby and bevy (like the typical English ⟨v⟩, but with both lips instead of with the upper teeth)
ps	at the beginning of words	[s]	psicología	only occurs in words of Ancient Greek origin
qu	before ⟨e⟩ or ⟨i⟩	[k]	quise	same as certain instances of English ⟨k⟩ ⟨c⟩ or ⟨q⟩; e.g. skull, scan, or unique (unaspirated, i.e. without the puff of air that accompanies English /k/ at the beginning of a word, e.g. in key)
qu	elsewhere; rare, and usually occurs in loanwords of Latin or English origin; considered by the RAE as an unadapted foreign spelling (see below)	[kw] (sometimes [k])	statu quo, quad, squash	same as the typical English ⟨qu⟩: quality
r	word-initial, morpheme-initial, (Note: In the verb subrayar the trilled initial [r] of the root raya is maintained, even with the prefix sub-. The same goes for ciudadrealeño (from Ciudad Real). However, after vowels, the initial ⟨r⟩ of the root becomes ⟨rr⟩ in prefixed or compound words: prorrogar, infrarrojo, autorretrato, arriesgar.) or after ⟨l⟩, ⟨n⟩, ⟨s⟩, or ⟨z⟩; in emphatic and oratorical or formal speech, may also be used instead of [ɾ] in syllable-final (especially before ⟨l⟩, ⟨m⟩, ⟨n⟩, ⟨s⟩, ⟨t⟩, or ⟨d⟩) and word-final positions (before pause or consonant-initial words only)	[r]	rumbo; honra; alrededor; israelí; Azrael; subrayar; amor puro	trilled or rolled ⟨r⟩
r	elsewhere	[ɾ]	caro; bravo; partir; amor eterno	flapped ⟨r⟩; e.g. similar to ⟨t⟩ of later in American English
rr	only occurs between vowels	[r]	carro	trilled or rolled ⟨r⟩
s	before a voiced consonant (e.g. ⟨l⟩, ⟨m⟩, ⟨d⟩,⟨g⟩)	[ð] (Andalussa) or [z] (most other regions)	isla; mismo; desde; jurisdicción; deshuesar; atisbo; presbítero; resbalar; rasgo; riesgo; desvelar; esvarar (Note: For many speakers, /s/ may debuccalize or be deleted in the syllable coda (at the end of words and before consonants).)	same as the typical English ⟨z⟩; e.g. the ⟨s⟩ in is or busy; in central and northern Spain, the Paisa region of Colombia, and the Andes, this sound is made with the tip of the tongue rather than the blade, with a sound quality intermediate between the alveolar [z] of English busy and the palato-alveolar [ʒ] of pleasure
s	everywhere else	[θ] (Andalussa) or [s] (most other regions)	saco; casa; deshora; espita	same as the typical English ⟨s⟩; sass; in central and northern Spain, Paisa region of Colombia, and Andes, this sound is made with the tip of the tongue rather than the blade, with a sound quality intermediate between the alveolar [s] of English sea and the palato-alveolar [ʃ] of sure
sh	only used in loanwords, generally from English; considered by the RAE as an unadapted foreign spelling (see below)	[ʃ] or [tʃ] (sometimes [s])	sherpa, show, flash, Áncash, Shanghái, Washington	same as the typical English ⟨sh⟩; e.g. sheesh; when this digraph is equated with the phoneme /s/ (typically in northern and central Spain, Paisa region of Colombia, and Andes), the sound is made with the tip of the tongue rather than the blade, with a sound quality intermediate between the alveolar [s] of English sea and the palato-alveolar [ʃ] of she
t	everywhere	[t]	tamiz; átomo	same as certain instances of English ⟨t⟩; e.g. stand (unaspirated, i.e. without the puff of air that accompanies English /t/ at the beginning of a word, e.g. in tan). Also, the tip of the tongue touches the upper teeth, rather than the alveolar ridge and found in the word month [mənt̪θ]
t	before voiced consonants	[ð]	atmósfera	same as the typical English voiced ⟨th⟩; e.g. this
tl	rare; mostly in loanwords from Nahuatl and Greek	[tl], [tɬ] or [ðl](depending upon the dialect)	tlapalería; cenzontle; Popocatépetl; atleta	similar to the combined ⟨tl⟩ sound in English cat-like
ts	rare; from loanwords	[ts]	tsunami	same as ⟨ts⟩ in English cats
tz	rare; from loanwords	[tθ] (central and northern Spain) or [ts] (most other regions)	quetzal; Pátzcuaro	Same to the combined ⟨tth⟩ sound in English eat things in central and northern Spain, or as ⟨ts⟩ in English cats in all other regions
w	rare; in loanwords from English and non-European languages	[w] (sometimes [ɡw] or [bw])	waterpolo, taekwondo, kiwi, wau, Wahid, Taiwán	usually the same as the ⟨w⟩ in English water
w	rare; in loanwords from German and in Visigothic names; word-initial after a pause, or after ⟨m⟩ or ⟨n⟩	[b] (Note: Orthographic ⟨w⟩ in names of Visigothic origin is thought to have represented /β/ in Old Spanish, in which /b/ and /β/ were separate phonemes); this /β/ phoneme was also spelled ⟨v⟩ in Old Spanish. See History of Spanish#Merger of /b/ and /v/.)	wolframio; Wamba; Wittenberg	same as the typical English ⟨b⟩; e.g. bib
w	rare; in loanwords from German and in Visigothic names; elsewhere (i.e. after a vowel, even across a word boundary, or after any consonant other than ⟨m⟩ or ⟨n⟩)	[β]	Volkswagen, Ludwig	between baby and bevy (like the typical English ⟨v⟩, but with both lips instead of with the upper teeth)
x	between vowels and word-finally	[ks] (sometimes [gz])	exacto; taxi; relax, exigente	same as the typical English ⟨x⟩; e.g. taxi or exactly
x	word-initially	[s]	xenofobia	same as the typical English ⟨s⟩; sass; in central and northern Spain, Paisa region of Colombia, and Andes, this sound is made with the tip of the tongue rather than the blade, with a sound quality intermediate between the alveolar [s] of English sea and the palato-alveolar [ʃ] of she
x	before a consonant	[ks] or [s]	extremo (Note: In words with ⟨xs⟩ (e.g., exsenador), the pronunciation is [ks], and the two [s] sounds are merged into one. The same goes for ⟨xc⟩ before ⟨e⟩ and ⟨i⟩ (e.g., excelente) in varieties with seseo.)	same as the typical English ⟨x⟩ or ⟨s⟩; e.g. max or mass
x	in some words borrowed from Nahuatl, mostly place names, and in some Spanish proper names conserving archaic spelling	[x] or [h]	México; Oaxaca; mexicano; Texas; La Axarquía; Ximena; Ximénez; Mexía; Roxas	similar to a "strong" English ⟨h⟩-sound (e.g. the ⟨ch⟩ in Scottish loch) or glottal ⟨h⟩ (as in heaven)
x	in some words from indigenous American languages, mostly place names	[ʃ] or [tʃ] (sometimes [s])	Xela; xocoyote; Mixco (['mis.ko])	same as the typical English ⟨sh⟩; e.g. sheesh; when this is equated with the phoneme /s/ (typically in northern and central Spain, the Paisa region of Colombia, and Andes), the sound is made with the tip of the tongue rather than the blade, with a sound quality intermediate between the alveolar [s] of English sea and the palato-alveolar [ʃ] of she
y	as a semivowel (almost always in a diphthong)	[i] or [j]	hay, soy	same as the typical English ⟨y⟩ (but joined in a single syllable with another vowel sound); aye, boy
y	as a consonant	[ʝ], [ʒ] or [ʃ] (depending upon the dialect)	ya; yelmo; ayuno	similar to the typical English ⟨y⟩, or ⟨j⟩ but softer; e.g. similar to yes, Jess or yeast
z	usually does not occur before ⟨e⟩ or ⟨i⟩	[θ] (central and northern Spain) or [s] (most other regions)	zorro; paz; caza	same as the English voiceless ⟨th⟩ (as in thing) in central and northern Spain, or the typical English ⟨s⟩ (as in sass) in all other regions
z	before voiced consonants	[ð] (central and northern Spain) or [z] (most other regions)	jazmín, juzgado, Aznar	same as the typical English voiced ⟨th⟩; e.g. this in central and northern Spain, or the typical English ⟨z⟩; e.g. the ⟨s⟩ in is or busy
zz	rare; in loanwords from Italian; considered by the RAE as an unadapted foreign spelling (see below)	[ts], [ks], [θ] (central and northern Spain) or [s] (most other regions) (sometimes [tʃ])	pizza, paparazzi	same as ⟨ts⟩ in English cats; same as the typical English ⟨x⟩; e.g. taxi or exactly; same as the typical English ⟨ch⟩; church; same as the English voiceless ⟨th⟩ (as in thing) in central and northern Spain, or the typical English ⟨s⟩ (as in sass) in all other regions

==== Vowels ====
Vowels
Letter	IPA	Examples	English approximation
a	[a]	azahar	between trap and spa
e	[e]	vehemente	between bet and bait
i	[i]	dimitir; mío	ski city
y	[i]	y	ski city
o	[o]	boscoso	between coat (American more than British) and caught
u	[u]	cucurucho; dúo	rule

Semivowels (Note: In Spanish, the letters i and u can combine with other vowels to form diphthongs (e.g. cielo, cuadro).)
Letter		IPA	Examples	English approximation
i	⟨i⟩ before a vowel	[j]	aliada; cielo; amplio; ciudad	you
hi; y	⟨hi⟩ before a vowel; ⟨y⟩ before a vowel	[ʝ]	hierba; hielo; ya; yelmo; ayuno	You
u	⟨u⟩ before a vowel (but silent in ⟨qu⟩ and ⟨gu⟩ before ⟨e⟩ or ⟨i⟩)	[w]	cuadro; fuego; arduo	wine
hu	⟨hu⟩ before a vowel	[w̝]	hueso; huevo; Huila<	Gwen

The phoneme /ʝ/ is realized as an approximant in all contexts except after a pause, a nasal, or a lateral. In these environments, it may be realized as an affricate ([ɟʝ]). The approximant allophone differs from non-syllabic /i/ in a number of ways; it has a lower F2 amplitude, is longer, can only appear in the syllable onset (including word-initially, where non-syllabic /i/ normally never appears), is a palatal fricative in emphatic pronunciations, and is unspecified for rounding (e.g. viuda [ˈbjuða] 'widow' and ayuda [aˈʝʷuða] 'help'). The two also overlap in distribution after /l/ and /n/: enyesar [eɲɟʝeˈsaɾ] ('to plaster') aniego [aˈnjeɣo] ('flood'). Although there is dialectal and ideolectal variation, speakers may also exhibit other near-minimal pairs such as abyecto ('abject') and abierto ('opened'), or even minimal pairs across word boundaries such as ya visto [(ɟ)ʝa ˈβisto] ('I already dress') and y ha visto [ja ˈβisto] ('and he has seen'). There are some alternations between the two, prompting scholars like Alarcos Llorach (1950) to postulate an archiphoneme /I/, so that ley [lei̯] would be transcribed phonemically as /ˈleI/ and leyes [ˈleʝes] as /ˈleIes/.

In a number of varieties, including some American ones, a process parallel to the one distinguishing non-syllabic /i/ from consonantal /ʝ/ occurs for non-syllabic /u/ and a rare consonantal /w̝/. Near-minimal pairs include deshuesar [dezw̝eˈsaɾ] ('to debone') vs. desuello [deˈsweʎo] ('skinning'), son huevos [ˈsoŋ ˈw̝eβos] ('they are eggs') vs son nuevos [ˈsoⁿ ˈnweβos] ('they are new'), and huaca [ˈ(ɡ)w̝aka] ('Indian grave') vs u oca [ˈwoka] ('or goose').

=== Doubling of vowels and consonants ===
Vowels in Spanish can be doubled to represent a hiatus of two identical vowels; e.g. leer, chiita, loor, duunviro. Thus, two identical vowel letters side by side belong to separate syllables, pronounced with a slight pulse or separation between them. This especially happens in prefixed and compound words; e.g. portaaviones, sobreesfuerzo, microorganismo. However, in this case simplification of double vowels is also mostly allowed; e.g. portaviones, sobresfuerzo, microrganismo. Simplification is not allowed when it would change the meaning: archiilegal ('arch-illegal') but archilegal ('arch-legal').

The only consonant letters that can be doubled in the Spanish orthography are ⟨l⟩, ⟨r⟩ (as the digraphs ⟨ll⟩ and ⟨rr⟩, respectively), ⟨c⟩ (only when they represent different sounds; e.g. acción, diccionario), ⟨n⟩ (e.g. innato, perenne, connotar, dígannos), and ⟨b⟩ (in a few words with the prefix sub-; e.g. subbase, subbético). Exceptions to this limitation are gamma (and its derivatives gammaglobulina, gammagrafía), digamma, kappa, atto-, as well as unadapted foreign words (including proper names) and their derivations (see below). When a double consonant other than ⟨nn⟩ or ⟨bb⟩ would appear on a morpheme border, it is simplified: digámoselo for digamos + se + lo, exilofonista for ex- + xilofonista. However, the combination sal + le (from the verb salir) is pronounced with a prolonged ⟨l⟩ ([̍ sal.le]) and has no correct spelling according to the current orthography. Using the spelling salle is considered incorrect, since it would imply a wrong pronunciation (and also would make the combination homographous with the form salle of the verb sallar); spellings such as sal-le and sal·le have been proposed but rejected by the RAE.

=== Optional omission of a consonant in consonant combination ===
In some words, one of consonants in a consonant combination may optionally be omitted. This includes Greek-derived words such as psicología / sicología, mnemónico / nemónico (word-initial consonant clusters that are foreign to Spanish are mostly simplified in pronunciation, but more commonly retained in spelling) and other words such as obscuro / oscuro, transcribir / trascribir, septiembre / setiembre (the spelling setiembre is mostly used in Costa Rica, Peru, Argentina, and Uruguay).

=== The letter Y ===
The letter ⟨y⟩ is consistently used in the consonantal value. The use of the letter ⟨y⟩ for a vowel or a semivowel is very restricted. The diphthongs ⟨ai, ei, oi⟩ are usually written ⟨ay, ey, oy⟩ at the end of words (e.g. hay, ley, voy), though exceptions occur in loanwords (e.g. bonsái, agnusdéi) and in Chilean voseo forms (e.g. estái, hablabai). The spelling ⟨uy⟩ is used at the end of some words, where it is pronounced as a falling diphthong, such as cocuy; the word muy may also be pronounced with a rising diphthong. The letter ⟨y⟩ is conserved in rarely used encliticized verbal forms like doyte, haylas (it is more normal to say te doy, las hay). The letter ⟨y⟩ is used for the vowel /i/ in the conjunction y and in some acronyms, like pyme (from pequeña y mediana empresa). Otherwise, ⟨y⟩ for a vowel or semivowel occurs only in some archaically spelled proper names and their derivations: Guaymas, guaymeño, and also fraybentino (from Fray Bentos with regular usage of ⟨y⟩ in a word-final diphthong). Derivatives of foreign proper names also conserve ⟨y⟩: taylorismo, from Taylor.

=== Special and modified letters ===
The vowels can be marked with an acute accent—⟨á, é, í, ó, ú, ý⟩—for two purposes: to mark stress if it does not follow the most common pattern, or to differentiate words that are otherwise spelled identically (called the tilde diacrítica in Spanish). The accented ⟨y⟩ is found only in some proper names: Aýna, Laýna, Ýñiguez.

A silent ⟨u⟩ is used between ⟨g⟩ and ⟨e⟩ or ⟨i⟩ to indicate a hard /ɡ/ pronunciation, so that ⟨gue⟩ represents /ɡe/ and ⟨gui⟩ represents /ɡi/. The letter ⟨ü⟩ (⟨u⟩ with diaeresis) is used in this context to indicate that the ⟨u⟩ is not silent, e.g. pingüino [piŋˈɡwino]. The diaeresis may occur also in Spanish poetry, occasionally, over either vowel of a diphthong, to indicate an irregular disyllabic pronunciation required by the meter (vïuda, to be pronounced as three syllables).

Also a silent ⟨u⟩ always follows a ⟨q⟩ when followed by ⟨e⟩ or ⟨i⟩, as in queso and química, but there is no case for the combination ⟨qü⟩, with ⟨cu⟩ fulfilling this role (as in cuestión). There are no native words in Spanish with the combination ⟨qua⟩ nor ⟨quo⟩; again, ⟨cu⟩ is used instead (cuando). When they appear, usually from Latin idioms such as statu quo, the ⟨u⟩ is not silent, so ⟨ü⟩ is never needed after ⟨q⟩. Prior to the introduction of the 2010 Common Orthography words such as cuórum ('quorum'), cuásar ('quasar') or Catar ('Qatar') were spelled with ⟨q⟩; this is no longer so.

=== Keyboard requirements ===
To write Spanish on a typewriter or to set type, the special characters required are ⟨á⟩, ⟨é⟩, ⟨í⟩, ⟨ó⟩, ⟨ú⟩, ⟨ñ⟩, ⟨Ñ⟩, ⟨ü⟩, ⟨Ü⟩, ⟨¿⟩, and ⟨¡⟩. The uppercase ⟨Á⟩, ⟨É⟩, ⟨Í⟩, ⟨Ó⟩, and ⟨Ú⟩ are also prescribed by the RAE, although occasionally dispensed with in practice.

As implemented on the mechanical typewriter, the keyboard contained a single dead key, with the acute accent ( ´ ) in the lowercase position and the diaeresis ( ¨ ) in the uppercase position. With these, one could write ⟨á⟩, ⟨é⟩, ⟨í⟩, ⟨ó⟩, ⟨ú⟩, and ⟨ü⟩. A separate key provided ⟨ñ/Ñ⟩. (A dead key "~" is used on the Spanish and Portuguese keyboards, but on the Hispanic American keyboard the "~" is not a dead key). The inverted marks ⟨¿⟩ and ⟨¡⟩ completed the required minimum. When an additional key was added to electro-mechanical typewriters, this was used for ⟨ª⟩ and ⟨º⟩, though these are not required. (These symbols are used for ordinal numbers: ⟨1.º⟩ for primero, ⟨2.ª⟩ for segunda, etc.)

As implemented in the MS-DOS operating system and its successor Microsoft Windows, a ⟨ç⟩ / ⟨Ç⟩ pair—not required in Spanish but needed for Catalan, Portuguese, and French—is typically added, and the use of the acute accent and diaeresis with capital letters (⟨Á⟩, ⟨É⟩, ⟨Í⟩, ⟨Ó⟩, ⟨Ú⟩, ⟨Ü⟩) is supported. Although not needed for Spanish, another dead key with ⟨`⟩ (the grave accent) in lowercase position and ⟨^⟩ (the circumflex accent) in uppercase position was included. Also available is ⟨·⟩ (the "flying point", required in Catalan). To make room for these characters not on the standard English keyboard, characters used primarily in programming, science, and mathematics—⟨[⟩ and ⟨]⟩, ⟨{⟩ and ⟨}⟩, ⟨/⟩ and ⟨|⟩, and ⟨<⟩ and ⟨>⟩—are removed, requiring special keystroke sequences to access.

On a USA or UK physical keyboard, all of the Spanish characters are present using the US-International layout.

=== Stress and accentuation ===
Stress in Spanish is marked unequivocally through a series of orthographic rules. The default stress is on the penultimate (next-to-last) syllable on words that end in a vowel, ⟨n⟩ or ⟨s⟩ (not preceded by another consonant) and on the final syllable when the word ends in any consonant other than ⟨n⟩ or ⟨s⟩ or in a consonant group. Words that do not follow the default stress have an acute accent over the stressed vowel. In many cases, the accent is essential to understanding what a word means, for example hablo 'I speak' contrasts with habló 'he/she/you spoke'.

A corollary of the accentuation rule above is that the written accent can sometimes appear in certain forms of a word but not others, to indicate that the same syllable is stressed. For example:

- Some nouns and adjectives gain or lose their accent mark when they become plural: e.g. andén → andenes; examen → exámenes.
- Verbs may gain or lose their accent mark when a pronominal suffix is added: e.g. manda + lo → mándalo; mandá + lo → mandalo.
  - An accent mark is always present if two (or more) pronouns are suffixed: manda + me + lo → mándamelo; mandá + me + lo → mandámelo.

For purposes of counting syllables and assigning stress in Spanish, where an unmarked high vowel is followed by another vowel the sequence is treated as a rising diphthong, counted as a single syllable—unlike Portuguese and Catalan, which tend to treat such a sequence as two syllables. A syllable is of the form XAXX, where X represents a consonant, permissible consonant cluster, or no sound at all, and A represents a vowel, diphthong, or triphthong. A diphthong is any sequence of an unstressed high vowel (⟨i⟩ or ⟨u⟩) with another vowel (as in gracias or náutico), and a triphthong is any combination of three vowels beginning and ending with unstressed high vowels (as in cambiáis or buey). Hence, Spanish writes familia (no accent), while Portuguese and Catalan both put an accent mark on família (all three languages stress the first ⟨i⟩). By contrast, Spanish puts the accent on día, while Portuguese and Catalan spell dia without the accent (again, all three languages stress the ⟨i⟩).

An accent over the high vowel (⟨i⟩ or ⟨u⟩) of a vowel sequence prevents it from being a diphthong (i.e., it signals a hiatus): for example, tía, dúo, oír and baúl all have two syllables each.

In the intervocalic position, the letter ⟨h⟩ does not necessarily mark a hiatus and therefore does not prevent the formation of a diphthong; for instance, ahumar is considered to have two syllables: ahu-mar ([aw.ˈmaɾ]). (Note: In practice this may vary in some regions, where ⟨h⟩ is used as a hiatus or diphthong-breaking mark for unstressed vowels, so the pronunciation would be then a-hu-mar ([a.u.ˈmaɾ]); however, that trait is gradually disappearing.) As such, it is also not taken into account when determining the stressed syllable; for example, desahucio has three syllables, with a being the stressed vowel: de-sahu-cio ([de.ˈsaw.θjo] or [de.ˈsaw.sjo]). This is also why words such as búho [ˈbu.o] require an acute accent over the high vowel to break the diphthong (without the accent, the word *buho would be considered a single-syllable word, with the assumed pronunciation [ˈbwo]).

If the diphthongs ⟨ai, ei, oi, ui⟩ are written ⟨ay, ey, oy, uy⟩ at the end of words, the letter ⟨y⟩ is considered a consonant letter for the purpose of accentuation: estoy, yóquey.

A word with final stress is called oxytone (or aguda in traditional Spanish grammar texts); a word with penultimate stress is called paroxytone (llana or grave); a word with antepenultimate stress (stress on the third-to-last syllable) is called proparoxytone (esdrújula). A word with preantepenultimate stress (on the fourth last syllable) or earlier does not have a common linguistic term in English, but in Spanish receives the name sobresdrújula. (Spanish words can be stressed only on one of the last three syllables, except in the case of a verb form with enclitic pronouns, such as poniéndoselo or llévesemelo.) All proparoxytones and sobresdrújulas have a written accent mark.

Adjectives spelled with a written accent (such as fácil, geográfico, cortés) keep the written accent when they are made into adverbs with the -mente ending (thus fácilmente, geográficamente, cortésmente), and do not gain any if they do not have one (thus libremente from libre). In the pronunciation of these adverbs—as with all adverbs in -mente—primary stress is on the ending, on the penultimate syllable. The original stress of the adjective—whether marked, as in fácilmente, or not marked, as in libremente—may be manifested as a secondary stress in the adverb (in Proto-Romance, the mente suffix was in fact a separate word).

Some words, such as piar, hierba, guion and truhan, are pronounced either with a diphthong or with a hiatus between the adjacent vowels, depending on the region. Pre-1999 orthographic rules treated these as hiatus, and accentuated the words accordingly (e.g. guión, truhán). The 1999 orthography reform by the RAE admitted the two spellings (with or without the accent), corresponding to two different pronunciations. The subsequent 2010 reform, though, declared that for orthographic and syllabification purposes such letter combinations should always be considered diphthongs, so the only correct spelling is now guion and truhan. Regardless of the spelling, however, these words may still be pronounced with a hiatus as before, and RAE does not discourage this practice. Furthermore, other grammatical rules were not changed by the reform; for example, "trees and grass" can be translated as either árboles y hierba (if hie pronounced as a diphthong) or árboles e hierba (if pronounced with a hiatus); the latter form is still correct even though hie is always treated as a diphthong for the purposes of syllabification.

==== Accentuation of capital letters ====
The Real Academia Española indicates that accents are required on capitals (but not when the capitals are used in acronyms).

=== Differential accents ===
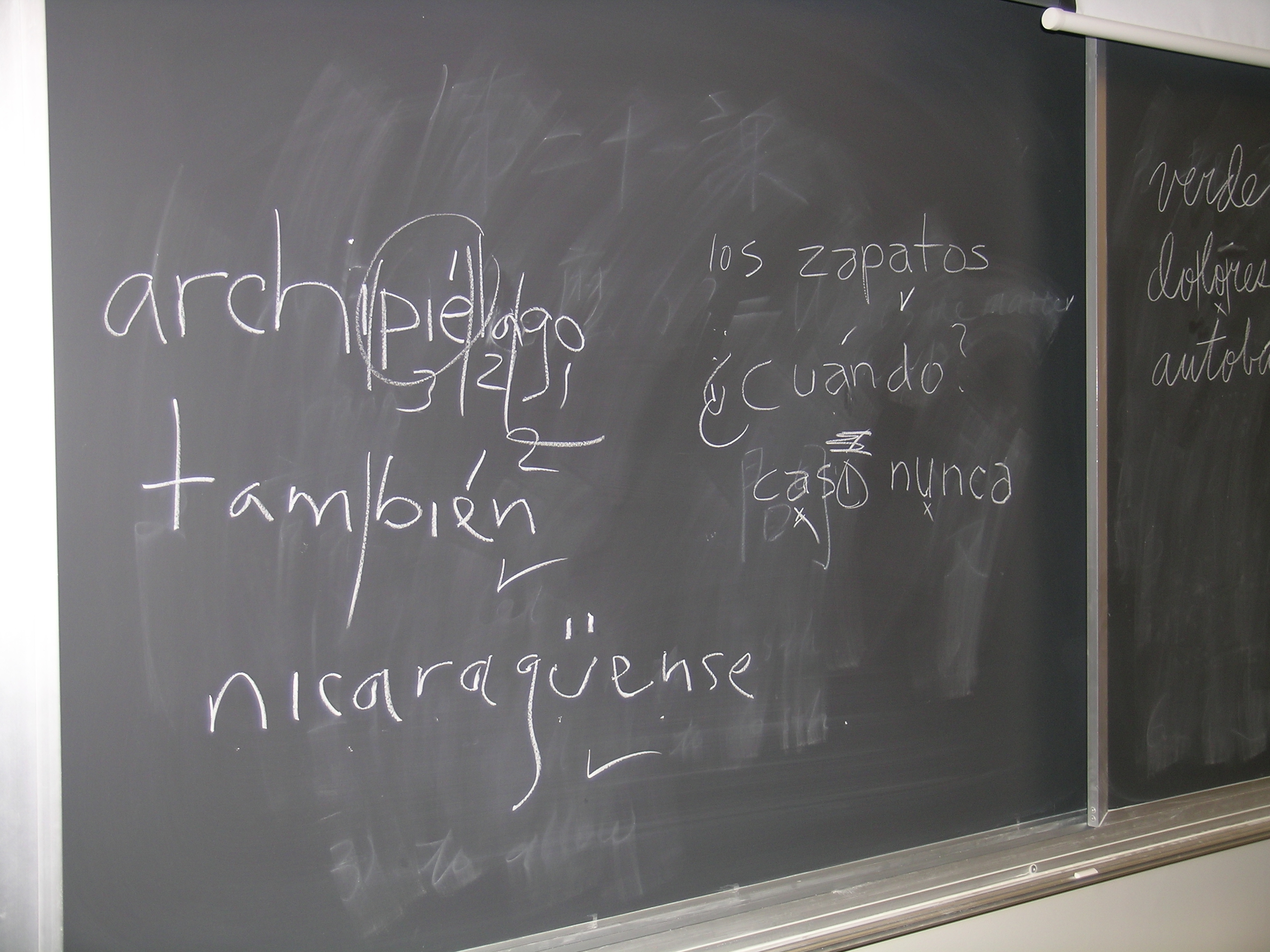
Blackboard used in a university classroom shows students' efforts at placing "ü" and acute accent diacritic used in Spanish orthography.

In eight cases, the written accent is used to distinguish stressed monosyllabic words from clitics:

Monosyllabic words distinguished by differential accent
Clitic	Stressed word
de ('of')	dé ('give' or present subjunctive and imperative of 'dar')
el ('the', masculine definite article)	él ('he, it' for masculine nouns)
mas ('but', archaic)	más ('more')
mi ('my')	mí ('me' after prepositions)
se (third person reflexive)	sé ('I know' or imperative 'be')
si ('if')	sí ('yes' or 'himself' after prepositions)
te (informal object case of 'you')	té ('tea')
tu (informal 'your')	tú (informal subject case of 'you')

The written accent in the word té is conserved in its plural: tés. However, it is usually not conserved in the imperatives dé and sé when combined with a pronominal suffix, unless it is necessary for stress purposes (e.g. dé + me → deme (formal form of "give me") and dé + lo → delo (formal form of "give it"), but dé + me + lo → démelo (formal form of "give it to me")).

Names of letters and musical notes are written without the accent, even if they have homonymous clitics: a, de, e, o, te, u; mi, la, si.

The written accent is also used in the interrogative pronouns to distinguish them from relative pronouns (which are pronounced the same but unstressed):

¿Adónde vas? 'Where are you going?'
Adonde no puedas encontrarme. 'Where you cannot find me.'

Relative and interrogative words distinguished by differential accent
Relative	Interrogative
como	cómo
cual(es)	cuál(es)
cuan	cuán
cuando	cuándo
cuanto(s) cuanta(s)	cuánto(s) cuánta(s)
cuyo(s) cuya(s)	cúyo(s) cúya(s) (Note: In modern Spanish, the interrogative and exclamative forms of cúyo have largely fallen into disuse, in favour of de qué or de quién. The relative pronoun cuyo, however, remains in common use alongside de que and de quien.)
(a)donde	(a)dónde
que	qué
quien(es)	quién(es)

The use of ⟨ó⟩ in the word o (meaning 'or') is a hypercorrection. Up until 2010, ⟨ó⟩ was used when applied to numbers: 7 ó 9 ('7 or 9'), to avoid possible confusion with the digit 0. The tenth congress of the Association of Spanish Language Academies deemed the use of an accent unnecessary, as typewriting eliminates possible confusion due to the different shapes of ⟨0⟩ (zero) and ⟨o⟩ (the letter).

The differential accent is sometimes used in demonstrative pronouns (e.g. éste 'this one') to distinguish them from demonstrative determiners (e.g. este 'this') and in the adverb sólo 'only' to distinguish it from the adjective solo. However, the current position of the RAE is not to use accent in these words regardless of their meaning (as they are always stressed), except in cases of possible ambiguity (and even then it is recommended to rephrase, avoiding the accented spellings of these words entirely).

These diacritics are often called acentos diacríticos or tildes diacríticas in traditional Spanish grammar.

=== Foreign words ===
Loanwords in Spanish are usually written according to Spanish spelling conventions (extranjerismos adaptados); such as in pádel, fútbol, chófer, máster, and cederrón ('CD-ROM'). However, some foreign words (extranjerismos crudos) are used in Spanish texts in their original forms, not conforming to Spanish orthographic conventions: e.g. ballet, blues, jazz, jeep, lady, pizza, sheriff, software.

RAE typographical emphasis of foreign words

Quiero escuchar jazz y comer pizza.

Quiero escuchar jazz y comer pizza.

Quiero escuchar "jazz" y comer "pizza".

Quiero escuchar «jazz» y comer «pizza».

The RAE prescribes extranjerismos crudos to be written with typographical emphasis: in italics in a text printed in roman type, and vice versa, and in quotation marks in a manuscript text or when italics are not available. This typographical emphasis is prescribed by the RAE since 1999. In practice, this RAE prescription is not always followed.

This typographical emphasis is not used for foreign proper names and their derivations with the suffixes -iano, -ismo, -ista; nor is it used for some Spanish derivations of extranjerismos crudos, such as pizzería. According to the RAE, presence of the letters ⟨k⟩ and ⟨w⟩, and also the letter ⟨h⟩ representing an aspirated sound, does not impede a loanword to be considered a Spanish word and to be written without the typographical emphasis and with an added acute accent if it is necessary to indicate the stressed syllable: hámster, sándwich.

However, spellings such as ⟨qu⟩ for [kw] or ⟨sh⟩ for [ʃ] (sometimes pronounced as [tʃ] or [s] by Spanish speakers) are not considered as belonging to the Spanish orthography, so words containing them are considered extranjerismos crudos and should be typographically emphasized according to RAE prescriptions: quad, squash, sherpa, show, flash. Before 2010, some words were written using ⟨qu⟩ for [kw] and the Spanish accent mark: quásar, quórum, exequátur. Since 2010, they are prescribed to be written either as cuásar, cuórum, execuátur (without the typographical emphasis) or as unadapted foreign words quasar, quorum, exequatur with the typographical emphasis. However, ⟨sh⟩ for [ʃ] is used together with the Spanish accent mark in some proper names such as Áncash or Shanghái, or even in rare words from non-Latin-script languages such as sharía (written with the typographical emphasis).

According to the current Ortografía, Latin expressions (e.g. curriculum vitae, grosso modo, statu quo) are treated as unadapted foreign words, so they are also typographically emphasized. From 1870 to 2010, Latin expressions in Spanish texts were accentuated according to the Spanish orthographical rules (e.g. currículum vítae) and not typographically emphasized. Some Latin expressions have become single words in Spanish: etcétera, suigéneris. These words are not typographically emphasized.

For foreign names from non-Latin-script languages, using Spanish orthographic transcription is recommended: Al-Yazira, Menájem Beguín.

=== Capitalization ===
Capitalization in Spanish is sparse compared to English. In general, only personal and place names, some abbreviations (e.g. Sr. López, but señor López); the first word of the title of a book, movie, song; and the first word in a sentence are capitalized. The names of companies, government bodies, and celebrations are usually capitalized. Some geographical names have a capitalized article: El Salvador, but los Estados Unidos. Capitalized article is also used in names of periodicals, such as El País, El Nuevo Diario. Some nouns have capital letters when used in a special administrative sense: Estado 'state' (sovereign polity), but estado 'state' (political division; condition). Nomenclature terms in geographical names are written in lowercase: el mar Mediterráneo 'the Mediterranean Sea'. According to the current Ortografía, geographical names of the type "nomenclature term + adjective from another name of the same geographical object" are not capitalized at all: la península ibérica 'the Iberian Peninsula', because ibérica comes from Iberia, another name of the same peninsula (although mainly used in a historical context).

Adjectives from geographical names, names of nationalities or languages are not capitalized, nor are days of the week and months of the year.

=== Writing words together and separately ===
The following words are written together:

- prefixed words, such as anteayer;
- adverbs ending in -mente, such as fácilmente;
- compound words from verbs and nouns, such as cumpleaños;
- the conjunction porque ('because') and the noun porqué ('reason');
- indefinite pronouns such as quienquiera;
- combinations of verbs with enclitic pronouns, such as entregándomelo 'delivering it to me' from entregando 'delivering' + me 'me' + lo 'it'.

The following word combinations are written separately:

- compound adverbs such as a menudo;
- the interrogative por qué ('why');
- combinations of prefixes and word combinations: vice primer ministro (but vicepresidente, vicerrector).

Coordinated compound adjectives are written with a hyphen: político-económico.

=== Syllabification ===
Spanish words are divided into syllables using the following rules:

1. A vowel between two consonants always ends the first syllable and the second consonant begins another: pá-ja-ro. Put differently, if a vowel follows a consonant, the consonant, not the vowel, must begin the new syllable.

2. If a vowel is followed by two consonants, the syllables divide between the consonants: can-tar, ver-ter, án-da-le. However, ch, ll, rr and combinations of b, c, d, f, g, k, p, t plus r or l do not divide: pe-rro, lu-char, ca-lle, pro-gra-ma, ha-blar. Exceptionally, r and l after a consonant can begin a new syllable in prefixed or compound words: sub-ra-yar, sub-lu-nar, ciu-dad-re-a-le-ño.

3. Two vowels may form a hiatus or a diphthong (see the section "Stress and accentuation" above): pa-e-lla, puen-te, ra-íz. Three vowels may sometimes form a triphthong: es-tu-diáis.

4. The silent h is not taken into account when syllabifying words. Two vowels separated by an h may form a hiatus or a diphthong: ahu-mar, de-sahu-cio, bú-ho.

The combination tl in the middle of words may be divided into syllables in two ways: at-le-ta or a-tle-ta, corresponding to the pronunciations [að̞ˈle.t̪a] (more common in Spain) and [aˈt̪le.t̪a] (more common in Hispanic America).

These rules are used for hyphenating words at the end of line, with the following additional rules:

1. One letter is not hyphenated. So, the word abuelo is syllabified a-bue-lo, but the only way to hyphenate it at the end of a line is abue-lo.

2. Hiatuses are not divided at the end of line. So, the word paella is syllabified as pa-e-lla, but the only way to hyphenate it at the end of a line is pae-lla. This rule includes hiatuses with an intervening silent h: alcohol is syllabified as al-co-hol, but the only way to hyphenate it at the end of a line is al-cohol. On the other hand, the name Mohamed contains a pronounced h, so the hyphenation Mo-hamed is accepted. See also rule 3 containing an exception to this rule.

3. Prefixed and compound words may be divided phonetically (corresponding to the above rules) or morphologically (the border between morphemes is considered a border between syllables): bie-nestar or bien-estar, inte-racción or inter-acción, reins-talar or re-instalar.

This rule is not valid:

a) for compounds in which one part is not used as an independent word: pun-tiagudo (not *punti-agudo);

b) for words with unproductive prefixes: arzo-bispo (not *arz-obispo);

c) for words containing etymological prefixes not determined as such by surface analysis: adhe-sivo (not *ad-hesivo).

4. Unusual combinations containing the letter h are not permitted at the beginning of a line: sulfhí-drico (not *sul-fhídrico), brah-mán (not *bra-hmán).

The letter x between vowels phonetically represents two consonants separated by a syllable border, but hyphenation at the end of line is permitted before the x: ta-xi, bo-xeo.

Words written with hyphen are hyphenated by repeating the hyphen on the following line: teórico-/-práctico. Repeating the hyphen is not necessary if the hyphenated word is a proper name where a hyphen is followed by a capital letter.

=== Abbreviations, symbols, acronyms ===
Abbreviations are written with the period: art. for artículo. Contractions are written in the same way: admón. for administración, or sometimes using superscript letters: D.ª for doña. Hyphenating abbreviations (including contractions) at the end of line is not allowed and putting them in separate lines with terms they accompany is not allowed. Abbreviations are not capitalized if the original word is written in lowercase, but there are some traditional exceptions: Ud. or Vd. for usted, Sr. for señor. Rarely, abbreviations are written using the slash: c/ for calle, b/n for blanco y negro.

One-letter abbreviations are pluralized by doubling the letter: pp. for páginas. More-than-one-letter abbreviations are pluralized by adding s: vols. for volúmenes. The ending -es is used for contractions if it appears in the corresponding complete word: admones. for administraciones. Traditional exceptions: the plural of pta. (peseta) is pts., that of cent. (centavo) and cént. (céntimo) is cts., and that of Ud. or Vd. (usted) is Uds. or Vds.

Letter symbols such as those of chemical elements or measurement units are written following international conventions and do not require the abbreviation period: H (hidrógeno), kg (kilogramo). For some notions, Spanish-specific symbols are used: O (oeste 'west'), sen (seno 'sine').

Acronyms are written in all capitals and read by letters (ONG for organización no gubernamental, 'non-governmental organization') or as words (ONU for Organización de las Naciones Unidas). Some acronyms read as words are written as normal words, including proper names of more than four letters such as Unesco, Unicef or common nouns such as ovni. Some acronyms read by letters may also be spelled according to their pronunciation: oenegé. Acronyms written in all capitals are not pluralized in writing, but they are pluralized in speech: las ONG [las o.e.neˈxes] 'the non-governmental organizations'.

=== Numerals ===
Numbers may be written in words (uno, dos, tres...) or in figures (1, 2, 3, ...).

For the decimal separator, the comma and the point are both accepted (3,1416 or 3.1416); the decimal comma is preferred in Spain, Argentina, Chile, Colombia, Ecuador, Paraguay, Peru, and Uruguay, but the decimal point is preferred in Mexico, the Dominican Republic, Guatemala, Honduras, Nicaragua, Panama, Puerto Rico, and Venezuela. Both marks are used in Bolivia, Costa Rica, Cuba, and El Salvador.

For the thousands separator, the currently standard mark is the thin space (123 456 789). Formerly, the point was sometimes used, but now it is not recommended.

When written in words, numbers up to 30 are nowadays written as a single word, e.g. dieciséis, veintinueve. The corresponding ordinal numbers may be written as a single word or separately, e.g. decimosexto (decimosexta, decimosextos, decimosextas) or décimo sexto (décima sexta, décimos sextos, décimas sextas). Numbers more than 30 (cardinal and ordinal) are usually written separately, e.g. treinta y cinco, trigésimo quinto, but one-word spellings such as treintaicinco, trigesimoquinto are also accepted by the current Ortografía.

Whole hundreds are also written as single words, e.g. cuatrocientos.

Fractionary numbers such as cincuentaiseisavo are written as a single word.

Daytime is written in the 24-hour format, using the colon (18:45) or the point (18.45). Dates are expressed in the day-month-year format, with the following options possible: 8 de mayo de 2015; 8-5-2015; 8-5-15; 8/5/2015; 8.5.2015; 8-V-2015. Leading zeros in the day and the month (08.05.2015) are not used, except in computerized or bank documents.

Roman numerals (I, II, III, ...) are used for centuries (e.g. siglo xxi) and for regnal numbers (e.g. Luis XIV). Roman or Arabic numerals may be used for historical dynasties (e.g. la xviii dinastía or la 18.ª dinastía); volumes, chapters, or other parts of books (e.g. tomo iii, tomo 3.º, 3.^{er} tomo, or tomo 3); celebrations (e.g. XXIII Feria del Libro de Buenos Aires, or 23.ª Feria...). Roman numerals are typeset in small capitals if they would not be capitalized when written in words.

== History ==
The Royal Spanish Academy has reformed the orthographic rules of Spanish several times.

In Old Spanish, ⟨x⟩ was used to represent the voiceless palatal sound /ʃ/ (as in dixo 'he/she said'), while ⟨j⟩ represented the voiced palatal /ʒ/ (as in fijo 'son'). With the changes of sibilants in the 16th century, the two sounds merged as /ʃ/ (later to become velar /x/), and the letter ⟨j⟩ was chosen for the single resulting phoneme in 1815. This results in some words that originally contained ⟨x⟩ now containing ⟨j⟩, most easily seen in the case of those with English cognates, such as ejercicio, "exercise". When Cervantes wrote Don Quixote he spelled the name in the old way (and English preserves the ⟨x⟩), but modern editions in Spanish spell it with ⟨j⟩. For the use of ⟨x⟩ in Mexico—and in the name México itself—see below.

The letter ⟨ç⟩ (c-cedilla)—which was first used in Old Spanish—is now obsolete in Spanish, having merged with ⟨z⟩ in a process similar to that of ⟨x⟩ and ⟨j⟩. Old Spanish coraçon, cabeça, fuerça became modern corazón, cabeza, fuerza.

Words formerly spelled with ⟨ze⟩ or ⟨zi⟩ (such as catorze, dezir, and vezino) are now written with ⟨ce⟩ and ⟨ci⟩ (catorce, decir, vecino, respectively). The sequences ⟨ze⟩ and ⟨zi⟩ do not occur in modern Spanish except some loanwords: zeugma, zigurat, zipizape; some borrowed words have double spellings: zinc / cinc. A notable case is the word enzima used in biochemistry, meaning "enzyme", as different from encima meaning "on", "over" or "on top of" something.

The old spellings with ⟨ç⟩, ⟨ze⟩, and ⟨zi⟩ remained in use until the eighteenth century. They were replaced by ⟨z⟩, ⟨ce⟩, and ⟨ci⟩, respectively in 1726. ⟨Ze⟩ and ⟨zi⟩ continued to be used in some words due to their etymology (e.g. zelo, zizaña), but this usage was largely reduced during the 1860—1880s, so these words became celo and cizaña. The letter ⟨x⟩ was replaced by ⟨j⟩ in 1815, although word-final ⟨x⟩ remained until 1832 (e.g. relox, now reloj). The combinations ⟨je⟩ and ⟨ji⟩ were originally used only in a few etymological cases (e.g. Jesús, Jeremías) and also in diminutives (pajita); in the Ortografía of 1815, ⟨xe⟩ and ⟨xi⟩ were replaced by ⟨ge⟩ and ⟨gi⟩ in some words (e.g. egemplo) but by ⟨je⟩ and ⟨ji⟩ in other words (e.g. dije); the Diccionario of 1817 used mostly ⟨je⟩ and ⟨ji⟩ (e.g. ejemplo) but ⟨ge⟩ and ⟨gi⟩ word-initially (e.g. gefe); in the Diccionario of 1832, ⟨ge⟩ and ⟨gi⟩ in words that did not have ⟨g⟩ in Latin were changed to ⟨je⟩, ⟨ji⟩ (e.g. muger, from Latin mulier, became mujer), but word-initial unetymological ⟨ge⟩ and ⟨gi⟩ remained; the Diccionario of 1837 stated explicitly that from then on, ⟨ge⟩ and ⟨gi⟩ were to be written only in words where they are justified by etymology.

Old Spanish used to distinguish /s/ and /z/ between vowels, and it distinguished them by using ⟨ss⟩ for the former and ⟨s⟩ for the latter, e.g. osso ('bear') and oso ('I dare to'). In orthography, the distinction was suppressed in 1763.

Words spelled in modern Spanish with ⟨cua⟩, ⟨cuo⟩ (e.g. cuando, cuatro, cuota) were written with ⟨qua⟩, ⟨quo⟩ up until 1815. In some words, ⟨co⟩ was written ⟨quo⟩ (e.g. quociente → cociente), and ⟨cue⟩ was written ⟨qüe⟩ (e.g. freqüente → frecuente). To distinguish ⟨quo⟩ pronounced ⟨co⟩ and ⟨cuo⟩, sometimes ⟨qüo⟩ was used for the latter, e.g. iniqüo, propinqüo (these forms appeared in the Ortografía, but the Diccionario did not put the diaeresis in these words).

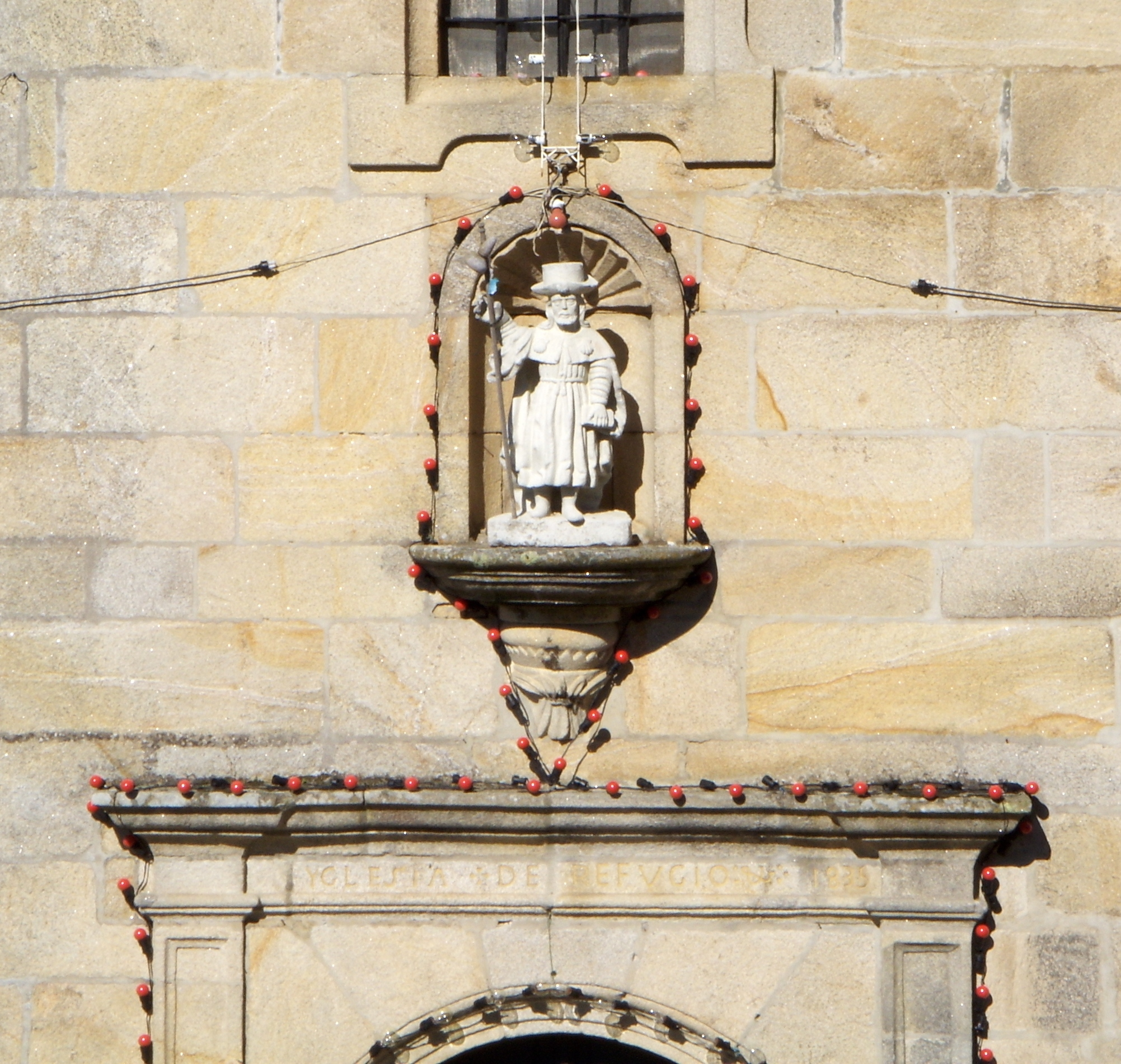
A church in Nigrán, marked as YGLESIA DE REFVGIO, "sanctuary church".

In 1726, most double consonants were simplified (e.g. grammatica → gramática, addicion → adición)—but the ⟨m⟩ of a prefix before the ⟨m⟩ of a root was differentiated to ⟨n⟩ in 1763 (e.g. "commover → conmover"). The prefixed and compound derivatives of words beginning with ⟨r⟩ were formerly written with a single ⟨r⟩ (e.g. prorogar, contraréplica); since 1870, they are written with ⟨rr⟩ if it is preceded by a vowel (e.g. prorrogar, contrarréplica). (Note: Although the Gramática of 1870 contains the spelling subrrogar (with ⟨rr⟩ after the consonant ⟨b⟩), that innovation was not followed in the Gramática of 1880 and later RAE works.) Also, the digraph ⟨rr⟩ in 1870 ceased to be divided at the end of a line: perro was formerly hyphenated per-ro, now pe-rro.

Also, the Graeco-Latin digraphs ⟨ch⟩, ⟨ph⟩, ⟨(r)rh⟩ and ⟨th⟩ were reduced to ⟨c⟩, ⟨f⟩, ⟨(r)r⟩ and ⟨t⟩, respectively (e.g. christiano → cristiano, triumpho → triunfo, myrrha → mirra, theatro → teatro). This was mostly done in 1754, but some exceptions with ⟨ch⟩ and ⟨ph⟩ persisted until 1803.

An earlier usage had ⟨Y⟩ as a word initial ⟨I⟩. It is only maintained in the archaic spelling of proper names like Yglesias or Ybarra. Although the RAE has always used the word-initial I as needed, the use of Y is occasionally found in handwriting and inscriptions up to the middle of the 19th century. The usage of ⟨y⟩ for the vowel in words of Greek origin was abolished in 1754 (e.g. lyra → lira). In the Diccionario de autoridades (1726–1739), the diphthongs ⟨ai⟩, ⟨ei⟩ and ⟨oi⟩ and the word ⟨mui⟩ were spelled with ⟨i⟩ (e. g. voi, estoi), except in the words ley, rey, buey, convoy, and oy (spelled there without the etymological ⟨h⟩, explained by the usage; but the Ortografía of 1754 used hoy). In 1741, the rule became to use ⟨y⟩ in the diphthongs ⟨ay⟩, ⟨ey⟩ and ⟨oy⟩ (e. g. ayre, peyne), except in verbal forms of the second person plural (e. g. amáis, amaréis), and in the words ⟨muy⟩, ⟨buytre⟩ (which became ⟨buitre⟩ in 1803). The usage of ⟨y⟩ in non-word-final diphthongs was abolished in 1815 (e.g. ayre → aire).

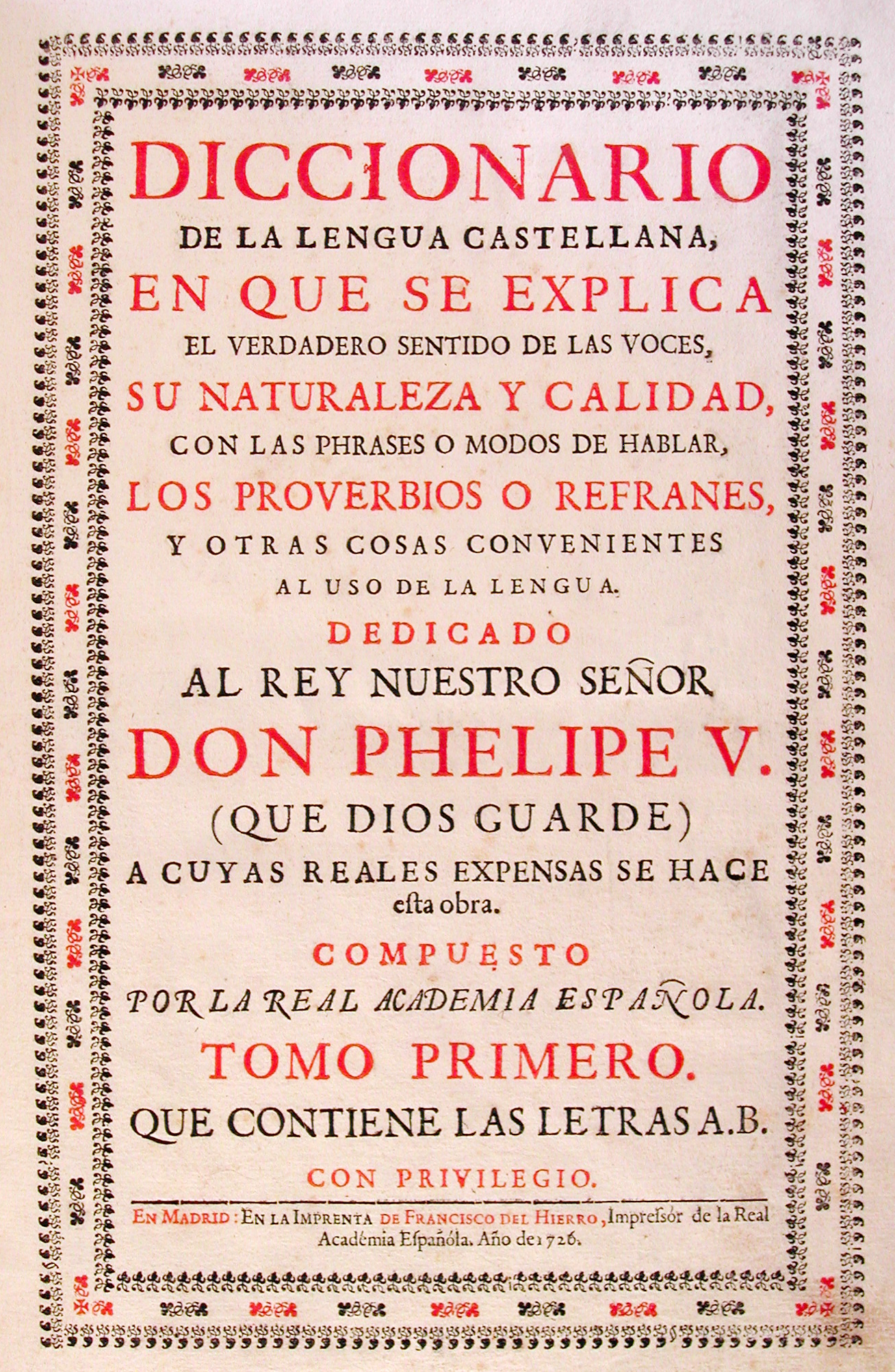
Cover of the first volume of the Diccionario de autoridades (1726), showing obsolete usages like "Phelipe", "eſta", "Impreſsór".

In early printing, the long s ⟨ſ⟩ was a different version of ⟨s⟩ used at the beginning or in the middle of a word. In Spain, the change to use the familiar round s everywhere, as in the current usage, was mainly accomplished between the years 1760 and 1766; for example, the multi-volume España Sagrada made the switch with volume 16 (1762).

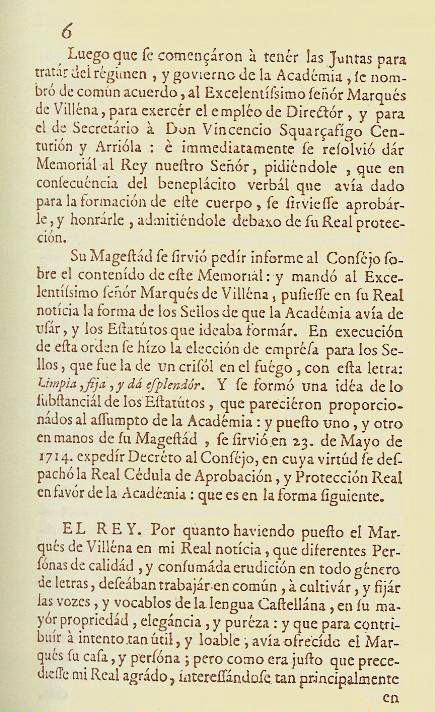
A page of the first edition of the RAE statutes (1715), showing many obsolete spellings.

From 1741 to 1815, the circumflex was used over vowels to indicate that preceding ⟨ch⟩ and ⟨x⟩ should be pronounced /k/ and /ks/ respectively and not /tʃ/ and /x/, e.g. patriarchâ, exâctitud.

The use of accent marks in printing varies by period, due to reforms successively promulgated by the Spanish Royal Academy. In early RAE publications (RAE statutes of 1715, Diccionario de autoridades of 1726), the acute accent was used extensively (e.g. Real Académia Españóla), although it was not used in paroxytones with two or more consonants after the stressed vowel, in most two-syllable paroxytones, and in some other words. (However, the Diccionario de autoridades, unlike the RAE statutes and later RAE publications, does not put accents on the capital letters.) In the Orthographía of 1741, the default stress is defined as paroxytone in words ending in ⟨a⟩, ⟨e⟩, ⟨o⟩, or ⟨s⟩, and in verbal forms ending in ⟨n⟩, and as oxytone in words ending in ⟨i⟩, ⟨u⟩, or other consonants. Since the Ortografía of 1754, the default stress is defined as paroxytone in words ending in vowels and oxytone in words ending in consonants, with some grammar-based exceptions, such as differential accents, plurals ending in ⟨s⟩, and verbal forms ending in ⟨n⟩ or ⟨s⟩; but other words ending in ⟨n⟩ or ⟨s⟩ were accented according to the general rule: capitan, jóven, demas, mártes. In 1880, the rules were simplified: grammatical considerations were no longer taken into account, except for differential accents. As a result, many words spelled previously without the accent gained it. These include words with final stress ending in -n (e.g. capitán, también, jardín, acción, común—but future-tense verb forms like serán, tendrán had already been spelled with the accent); words ending in ⟨s⟩ which are not plurals (e.g. francés, compás, demás); verbs in the imperfect tense (e.g. tenía, vivían, already written so in the Gramática of 1870); the possessives mío and mía and the word día. On the other hand, some words lost their accent mark, e.g. jóven → joven, mártes → martes. Meanwhile, one-letter words other than the conjunction y—namely the preposition a and the conjunctions e (the form of y before an [i] sound), o, and u (form of o before [o])—were written with the grave accent (à, è, ò, ù) in early RAE publications and with the acute accent (á, é, ó, ú) from 1741 to 1911. The accent-marked infinitives such as oír, reír, sonreír began to outnumber the unaccented form around 1920, dropped the accent mark again in 1952, and regained it in 1959. Monosyllabic preterite verb forms such as dio and fue were written with accent marks before 1952.

The Ortografía 1754 and later editions also stated that surnames ending in -ez are not accented, though pronounced as paroxytones, e.g. Perez, Enriquez. The Prontuario 1853 and later editions did not mention surnames ending in -ez explicitly (but Perez occurs in capitalization rules), but stated that oxytone surnames are accented (e.g. Ardanáz, Muñíz) except when homonymous to nouns, adjectives, geographical names, or verb infinitives (e.g. Calderon, Leal, Teruel, Escalar). The Gramática 1870 stated that surnames ending in consonant and traditionally written without the accent are sometimes pronounced as paroxytones (e.g. Gutierrez, Aristizabal) and sometimes as oxytones (e.g. Ortiz) and recommends following the general rule for accentuation of surnames. The Gramática 1880 follows the general rule for accentuation of surnames: Enríquez, Fernández.

Since 1952, the letter ⟨h⟩ is no longer considered an interruption between syllables, so the spellings such as buho, vahido, tahur became búho, vahído, tahúr. The spelling desahucio was not changed, as pronouncing this word with a diphthong (/de.ˈsau.θjo/ instead of the former pronunciation /de.sa.ˈu.θjo/) came to be considered the norm.

History of differential accents:

- Ortografía 1754: dé, sé, sí.
- Ortografía 1763: dé, sé, sí, él, mí.
- The word tú is accented in the Diccionario since 1783.
- Accented interrogatives appear in the Diccionario from 1817.
- The word té is accented in the Diccionario from 1832; the accent disappeared after 1880 and reappeared in 1925.
- The word más is accented in the Prontuario since 1853.
- The Prontuario 1853 also added luégo (as an adverb) and the verb forms éntre, pára, sóbre; the Gramática 1870 also added nós (as majestic 'we'), and the musical notes mí, lá, sí. These accents were abolished by the Gramática 1880.
- The Gramática 1870 also mentions the obsolete pronoun ál ('another thing'), which is also mentioned in the Diccionario since 1869.
- The demonstrative pronouns éste, ése, aquél appear accented since the Prontuario 1853. However, the norms of 1952 stated that they may be not accented except in the case of ambiguity and also extended the possibility of accentuating to other similar words such as otro, algunos, pocos, muchos; this extension was abolished by the revision of 1959.
- The adverb sólo is mentioned by the Prontuario 1853, but not by the Gramática 1870. The Gramática 1880 states that the word is accented "by the common usage" (por costumbre). The norms of 1952 made the accent on sólo mandatory, but their revision of 1959 stated the accent in sólo is not normally needed, but can be used in the cases of ambiguity. The Ortografía 1999 states that the accent in sólo may be used, but it is necessary only in the cases of ambiguity. The Ortografía 2010 recommends not to accent the demonstratives and sólo, but the DLE 2014 states that they may be accented in cases of ambiguity.
- Additionally, the words aun (normally pronounced with a diphthong) and aún (normally pronounced with a hiatus) were originally not distinguished, but they appear in the Prontuario 1853 as áun and aún. Since the Gramática 1880, they are spelled aun and aún.

The names of numbers in the upper teens and the twenties were originally written as three words (e.g. diez y seis, veinte y nueve), but nowadays they are spelled as a single word (e.g. dieciséis, veintinueve). For the numbers from 21 to 29, the "fused" forms are accepted since 1803 and became common over the second half of the 19th century. For those from 16 to 19, the one-word forms became accepted in 1925 and took the lead in the 1940s. The Diccionario panhispánico de dudas (2005) labeled the separate spelling as obsolete. Fusing of number-names above 30 (e.g. treintaicinco, cuarentaiocho) is rare, but accepted by the DPD 2005 and the Ortografía 2010 besides the usual separate spelling: treinta y cinco, cuarenta y ocho.

In the 18th century, the letter ⟨k⟩ was used in a few loanwords and also in the word kalendario (following the Latin spelling Kalendae); however, the first edition of the Diccionario de la lengua castellana (1780) already spelled calendario. The fourth edition of the Diccionario de la lengua castellana (1803) stated that ⟨k⟩ may be in any case replaced by ⟨c⟩ or ⟨qu⟩ and did not give any words beginning with ⟨k⟩, while still including the letter in the alphabet. In the eighth edition of the Ortografía de la lengua castellana (1815), the letter ⟨k⟩ was deleted from the Spanish alphabet. However, the letter was reinstated in the fourth edition of the Prontuario de ortografía de la lengua castellana (1853), and its use in loanwords was reallowed.

The letter ⟨w⟩ was formerly considered unneeded for writing Spanish. Previous RAE orthographies did not include ⟨w⟩ in the alphabet and restricted its use to foreign proper names and Visigothic names from Spanish history (the use of ⟨w⟩ in Visigothic names stems from the Middle Ages, although at that time ⟨w⟩ was not considered a letter but a ligature of two ⟨v⟩s or ⟨u⟩s). However, in the Ortografía of 1969, RAE included ⟨w⟩ into the Spanish alphabet, allowing its use in loanwords.

In 1999, the written accent was added to a few words ending on the stressed diphthong au or eu: marramau became marramáu. Before 1999, the combinations of accented verb forms with enclitic pronouns conserved the written accent, but now they do not if the general rules of accentuation do not require it: salióse → saliose (salió + se), déme → deme (dé + me).

=== Reform proposals ===
In spite of the relatively regular orthography of Spanish, there have been several initiatives to simplify it further. Andrés Bello succeeded in making his proposal official in several South American countries, but they later returned to the standard set by the Real Academia Española. Another proposal, Ortografía R̃asional Ispanoamerikana, remained a curiosity. Juan Ramón Jiménez proposed changing ⟨ge⟩ and ⟨gi⟩ to ⟨je⟩ and ⟨ji⟩, but this is only applied in editions of his works or those of his wife, Zenobia Camprubí. Gabriel García Márquez raised the issue of reform during the first International Conference of the Spanish Language held in Zacatecas in 1997, most notoriously advocating for the suppression of ⟨h⟩, which is mute in Spanish, but, despite his prestige, no serious changes were adopted. The Academies, however, from time to time have made minor changes in the orthography (see above).

A Mexican Spanish convention is to spell certain indigenous words with ⟨x⟩ rather than the ⟨j⟩ that would be the standard spelling in Spanish. This is generally due to the origin of the word (or the present pronunciation) containing the voiceless postalveolar fricative /ʃ/ sound or another sibilant that is not used in modern standard Spanish. The most noticeable word with this feature is México. The Real Academia Española recommends this spelling. The American Spanish colloquial term chicano is shortened from mechicano, which uses /tʃ/ in place of the /ʃ/ of rural Mexican Spanish /meʃiˈkano/.

== Punctuation ==
Punctuation in Spanish is generally similar to punctuation in English and other European languages, but has some differences.

Spanish has the unusual feature of indicating the beginning of an interrogative or exclamatory sentence or phrase with inverted variants of the question mark and exclamation mark ([¿] and [¡]), respectively. Most languages that use the Latin alphabet (including Spanish) use question and exclamation marks at the end of sentences and clauses. These inverted forms appear additionally at the beginning of these sentences or clauses. For example, the English phrase "How old are you?" has just the final question mark, while the Spanish equivalent, ¿Cuántos años tienes? begins with an inverted question mark.

The inverted question and exclamation marks were gradually adopted following the Real Academia's recommendations in the second edition of the Ortografía de la lengua castellana in 1754. Originally, the usage of inverted marks at the beginning was recommended only for large sentences, but the Gramática of 1870 made them mandatory for all interrogative or exclamatory sentences.

The inverted question and exclamation marks may be used at the beginning of a clause in the middle of a sentence, for example: Si no puedes ir con ellos, ¿quieres ir con nosotros? ('If you cannot go with them, would you like to go with us?').

Sentences that are interrogative and exclamative at the same time may be written with two signs on each side: ¿¡...!? or ¡¿...?! or with one sign on each side: ¡...? or ¿...!

However, parenthesized signs to show doubt or surprise are written as single signs: (?) (!). Doubtful dates may be written with single or double signs: 1576? or ¿1576?

The period indicates the end of the sentence.

The comma is used for separating appositions, subordinate clauses, interjections, tags in tag questions, vocatives, and discursives. It is also used in enumerations, but the serial comma is not used in Spanish: España, Francia y Portugal ('Spain, France(,) and Portugal'). There are some cases in which the comma is used after a coordinating conjunction, such as complex sentences. Circumstantial complements are usually not separated by a comma.

The semicolon is used for a more significant pause than the comma. It may mean an intermediate division between the comma and the period or separate parts of a sentence which already contain commas.

The colon is used for generalizing words before enumerations, for exemplifications, before the direct speech. Sometimes it can be used for juxtaposing clauses (similar to the semicolon), after discursives, and in titles of the type "general: special". The colon is the standard mark in Spanish for addressing people in letters (Estimado profesor:, Querido amigo:); using the comma in this case is considered nonstandard.

The parentheses are used to include parenthetical information. When an entire sentence is parenthesized, the period is placed after the parentheses: (Esta es una frase parentética).

The square brackets are used for writing editor's words inside citations and instead of parentheses inside parentheses.

The dash may be used to write direct speech in dialogues, as a quotation dash. Two dashes can sometimes introduce parenthetical constructions. The dash can also be used as a marker in enumerations. The combination "period+dash" may be used to separate the name of the topic and other information, or to separate characters' names and their lines in theatrical works.

The quotation marks (for citations, direct speech, words in unusual form or meaning) are used in three styles: angled quotation marks (« ») for the outer level, double quotation marks (“ ”) for the inner level, single quotation marks (‘ ’) for the third level. This is the system preferred in Spain, whereas Hispanic American publications often do not use the angled quotation marks. When a closing quotation mark occurs together with another punctuation mark, it is placed after the quotation mark.

The ellipsis is used for marking a sudden pause or suspension in thought and for incomplete citations. The combination "ellipsis+period" is simplified to the ellipsis, but the abbreviation point remains before the ellipsis. When an ellipsis occurs together with another punctuation mark, then the comma, the semicolon, and the colon are placed after the ellipsis, but other punctuation marks may be placed before or after the ellipsis depending on the structure of the sentence.

== Arabic alphabet ==
In the 15th and 16th centuries, dialectal Spanish (as well as Portuguese and Ladino) was sometimes written in the Arabic alphabet by Moriscos.

== See also ==
- Inverted question and exclamation marks
- Spanish manual alphabet
- Chilean manual alphabet

== Bibliography ==
- Penny, Ralph (2002). A History of the Spanish Language. Cambridge: Cambridge University Press. ISBN 0-521-01184-1.
- Butt, John; Benjamin, Carmen (2011). A New Reference Grammar of Modern Spanish (5th ed.). Oxford: Routledge. ISBN 978-1-444-13769-9.
- Martínez Celdrán, Eugenio; Fernández Planas, Ana Ma.; Carrera Sabaté, Josefina (2003), "Castilian Spanish", Journal of the International Phonetic Association, 33 (2): 255–259, doi:10.1017/S0025100303001373
- Ortografía de la lengua española [Orthography of the Spanish language] (in Spanish). Real Academia Española (RAE). 2010.
