= Equus =

Equus may refer to:

- Equus (genus), a genus of animals that includes horses, donkeys, and zebras
- Equus (play), a 1973 play by Peter Shaffer
- Equus (film), a 1977 film adaptation of the Peter Shaffer play
- Equus (character), a character in DC Comics
- Equus (magazine), American monthly lifestyle magazine for horse owners

== Music ==
- "Equus", a composition for concert band by Eric Whitacre
- "Equus", a 2004 song by Blonde Redhead
- "Equus", a 1994 song by Cherry Poppin' Daddies

== Transportation ==
- Equus Automotive, an American muscle car producer
- Hyundai Equus, Korean automobile model built by Hyundai Motor Company
- Vauxhall Equus, 1978 concept car

== See also ==
- Eques (ancient Rome), a member of one of the noble classes of Ancient Rome
- Equestrian (disambiguation)
