= Equi Terme =

Coordinates: 44°10′08″N 10°09′09″E

- Frazione
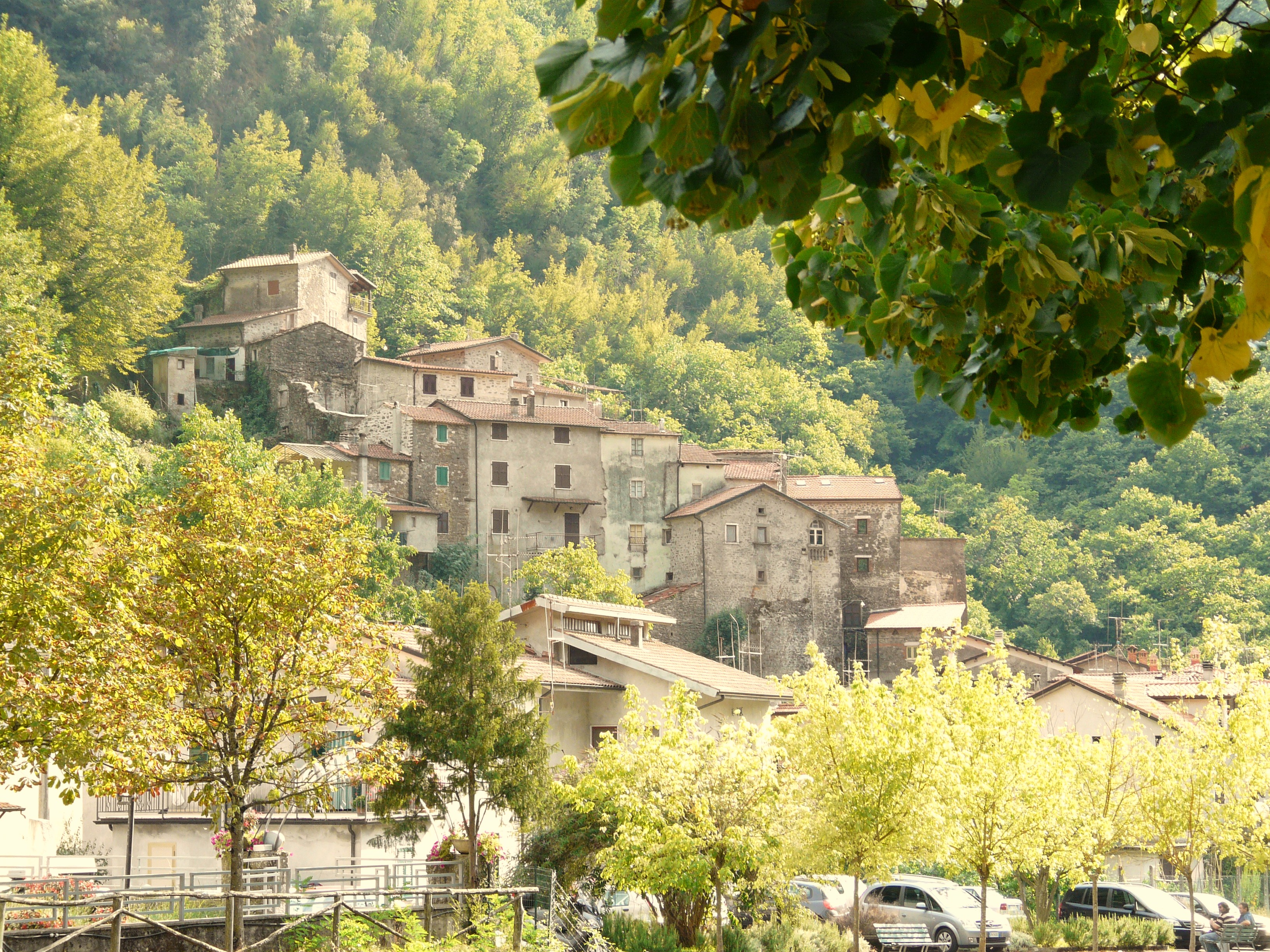
- Interactive map of Equi Terme
- Country: Italy
- Region: Tuscany
- Province: Massa-Carrara
- Comune: Fivizzano
- Elevation: 250 m (820 ft)

Population (2011)
  - Total: 131
- Demonym(s): eques(e/i), equens(e/i)
- Time zone: UTC+1 (CET)
- Postal code: 54013
- Area code: 0585

Equi Terme is a part of the Italian comune Fivizzano, in the province of Massa and Carrara, in Tuscany.
