= Monsoon of South Asia =

Monsoon in Indian subcontinent

A visualisation of the South Asian Monsoon based on the Climate Hazards Group InfraRed Precipitation with Station data (CHIRPS) 30+ year quasi-global rainfall dataset, analysed and visualised using Google Earth Engine.

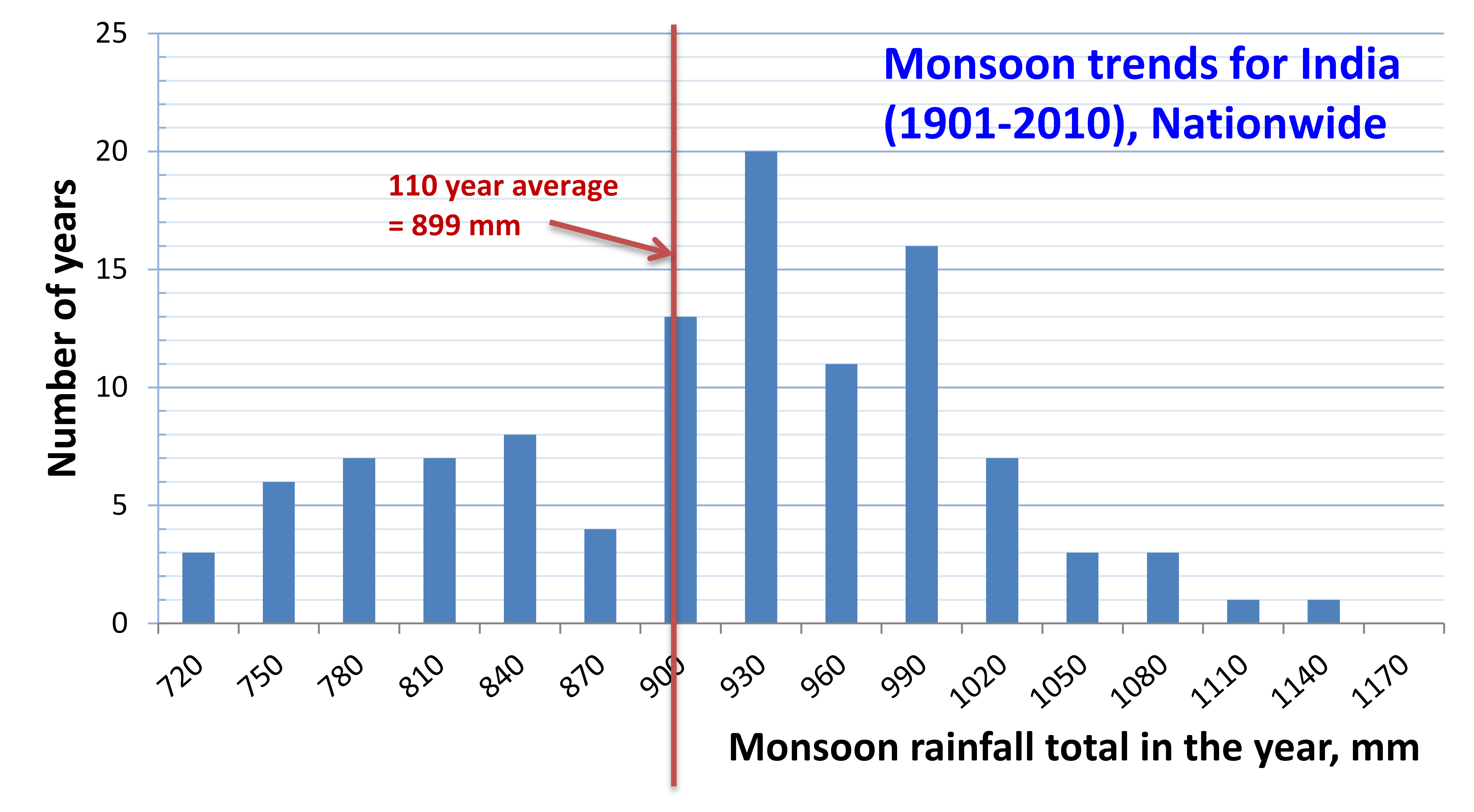
Annual average monsoon precipitation in India over 110 years. The long-term average has been 899 millimeters of precipitation. However, the monsoon varies over the Indian subcontinent within a ±20% range. Rains that exceed 10% typically lead to major floods, while a 10% shortfall is a significant drought.

The Monsoon of South Asia is among several geographically distributed global monsoons. It affects the Indian subcontinent, where it is one of the oldest and most anticipated weather phenomena, and an economically important pattern every year from June through September, but it is only partly understood and notoriously difficult to predict. Several theories have been proposed to explain the origin, process, strength, variability, distribution, and general vagaries of the monsoon, but understanding and predictability are still evolving.

The unique geographical features of the Indian subcontinent, along with associated atmospheric, oceanic, and geographical factors, influence the behavior of the monsoon. Because of its effect on agriculture, on flora and fauna, and on the climates of nations such as Bangladesh, Bhutan, India, Nepal, Pakistan, and Sri Lanka – among other economic, social, and environmental effects – the monsoon is one of the most anticipated, tracked, and studied weather phenomena in the region. It has a significant effect on the overall well-being of residents and has even been dubbed the "real finance minister of India".

== Definition ==
The word monsoon, derived from the Arabic word موسم (mawsim) meaning "season", colloquially refers to a season of greatly intensified precipitation that occurs in some coastal regions in the tropics and subtropics. Scientifically however, while generally defined as a system of winds characterized by a seasonal reversal of direction, there are several more detailed definitions used by various meteorological and climatological sources. Some examples:

- The American Meteorological Society calls it a name for seasonal winds, first applied to the winds blowing over the Arabian Sea from the northeast for six months and from the southwest for six months. The term has since been extended to similar winds in other parts of the world.
- The Intergovernmental Panel on Climate Change (IPCC) describes a monsoon as a tropical and subtropical seasonal reversal in both surface winds and associated precipitation, caused by differential heating between a continental-scale land mass and the adjacent ocean.
- The India Meteorological Department defines it as the seasonal reversal of the direction of winds along the shores of the Indian Ocean, especially in the Arabian Sea, which blow from the southwest for half of the year and from the northeast for the other half.
- Colin Stokes Ramage, in Monsoon Meteorology, defines the monsoon as a seasonal reversing wind accompanied by corresponding changes in precipitation.

Thus, similar seasonal precipitation patterns in other parts of the world are not always true monsoons.

== Background ==
The first people to observe the combined pattern of the monsoons' branches over different regions of South Asia were sailors in the Arabian Sea who traveled between Africa, India, and Southeast Asia.

The monsoon can be categorized into two branches based on their spread over the subcontinent:

- Arabian Sea branch
- Bay of Bengal branch

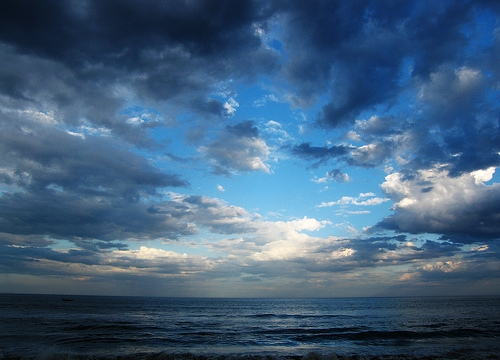
Southwest monsoon clouds over Tamil Nadu.

Alternatively, it can be categorized into two segments based on the direction of rain-bearing winds:

- Southwest (SW) monsoon
- Northeast (NE) monsoon (Note: The name of the wind is based on the direction that it blows from. Southwest winds blow onto the land from the southwest. Northeast winds flow from the northeast toward the southwest, onto the land.)

Based on the time of year that these winds bring rain to India, the monsoon can also be categorized into two periods:

- Summer monsoon (May to September)
- Winter monsoon (October to November)

The complexity of the monsoon of South Asia is not completely understood, making it difficult to accurately predict the quantity, timing, and geographic distribution of the accompanying precipitation. These are the most monitored components of the monsoon, and they determine the water availability in India for any given year.

== Changes of the Monsoon ==
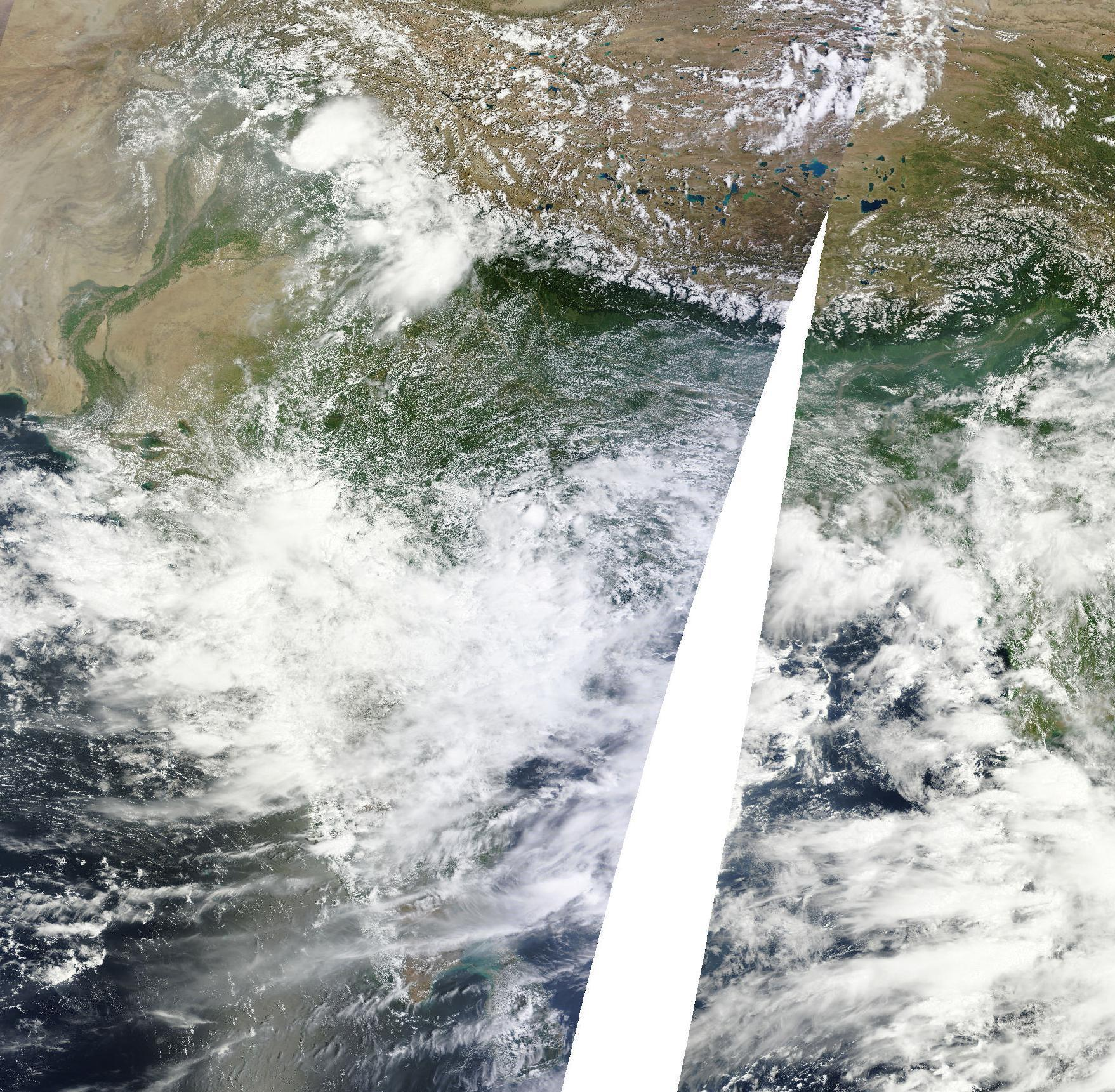
Monsoon over South Asia

Monsoons typically occur in tropical areas. One area that monsoons impact greatly is India. In India monsoons create an entire season in which the winds reverse completely.

The rainfall is a result of the convergence of wind flow from the Bay of Bengal and reverse winds from the South China Sea.

The onset of the monsoon occurs over the Bay of Bengal in May, arriving at the Indian Peninsula by June, and then the winds move towards the South China Sea.

=== Effect of geographical relief features ===
Although the southwest and northeast monsoon winds are seasonally reversible, they do cause precipitation on their own.

Two factors are essential for rain formation:

1. Moisture-laden winds
2. Droplet formation

Additionally, one of the causes of rain must happen. In the case of the monsoon, the cause is primarily orographic, due to the presence of highlands in the path of the winds. Orographic barriers force wind to rise. Precipitation then occurs on the windward side of the highlands because of adiabatic cooling and condensation of the moist rising air.

The unique geographic relief features of the Indian subcontinent come into play in allowing all of the above factors to occur simultaneously. The relevant features in explaining the monsoon mechanism are as follows:

1. The presence of abundant water bodies around the subcontinent: the Arabian Sea, Bay of Bengal, and Indian Ocean. These help moisture accumulate in the winds during the hot season.
2. The presence of abundant highlands like the Western Ghats and the Himalayas right across the path of the southwest monsoon winds. These are the main cause of the substantial orographic precipitation throughout the subcontinent. (Note: The Aravalli Mountains also lie in the path of the southwest monsoon but do not result in much precipitation because they are in the direction of the path of the southwest winds and not across them, causing no orographic lift of the winds.)
  1. The Western Ghats are the first highlands of India that the southwest monsoon winds encounter. (Note: Other major highlands, like the Cardamom Hills, Anaimalai Hills, and Nilgiri Mountains, that play active roles in the monsoon are considered major extensions of the Western Ghats and are thus not discussed separately.) The Western Ghats rise abruptly from the Western Coastal Plains of the subcontinent, making effective orographic barriers for the monsoon winds.
  2. The Himalayas play more than the role of orographic barriers for the monsoon. They also help confine it to the subcontinent. Without them, the southwest monsoon winds would blow right over the Indian subcontinent into Tibet, Afghanistan, and Russia without causing any rain. (Note: First, the Himalayas serve as orographic barriers to the southwest monsoon winds. Second, they help confine the winds to the subcontinent, hampering their northward progress. Third, they contribute to the convergence of the Bay of Bengal branch and Arabian Sea branch of the southwest monsoon winds, increasing the intensity of precipitation over the northern part of the subcontinent. Fourth, they are a major factor in the bursting of the monsoon under the jet stream theory. Fifth, they help determine the direction of the Bay of Bengal branch of the northeast monsoon. Their role is still a matter of active study, and understanding of them is evolving regularly.)
  3. For the northeast monsoon, the highlands of the Eastern Ghats play the role of orographic barrier.
Pink arrow: Southwest monsoon wind direction; green arrow: northeast monsoon wind direction.

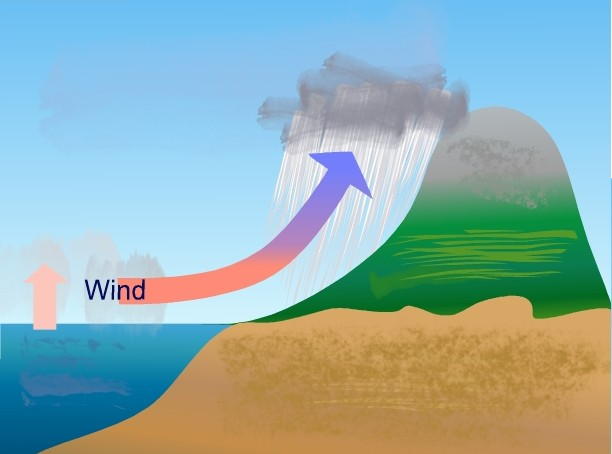
Orographic precipitation.

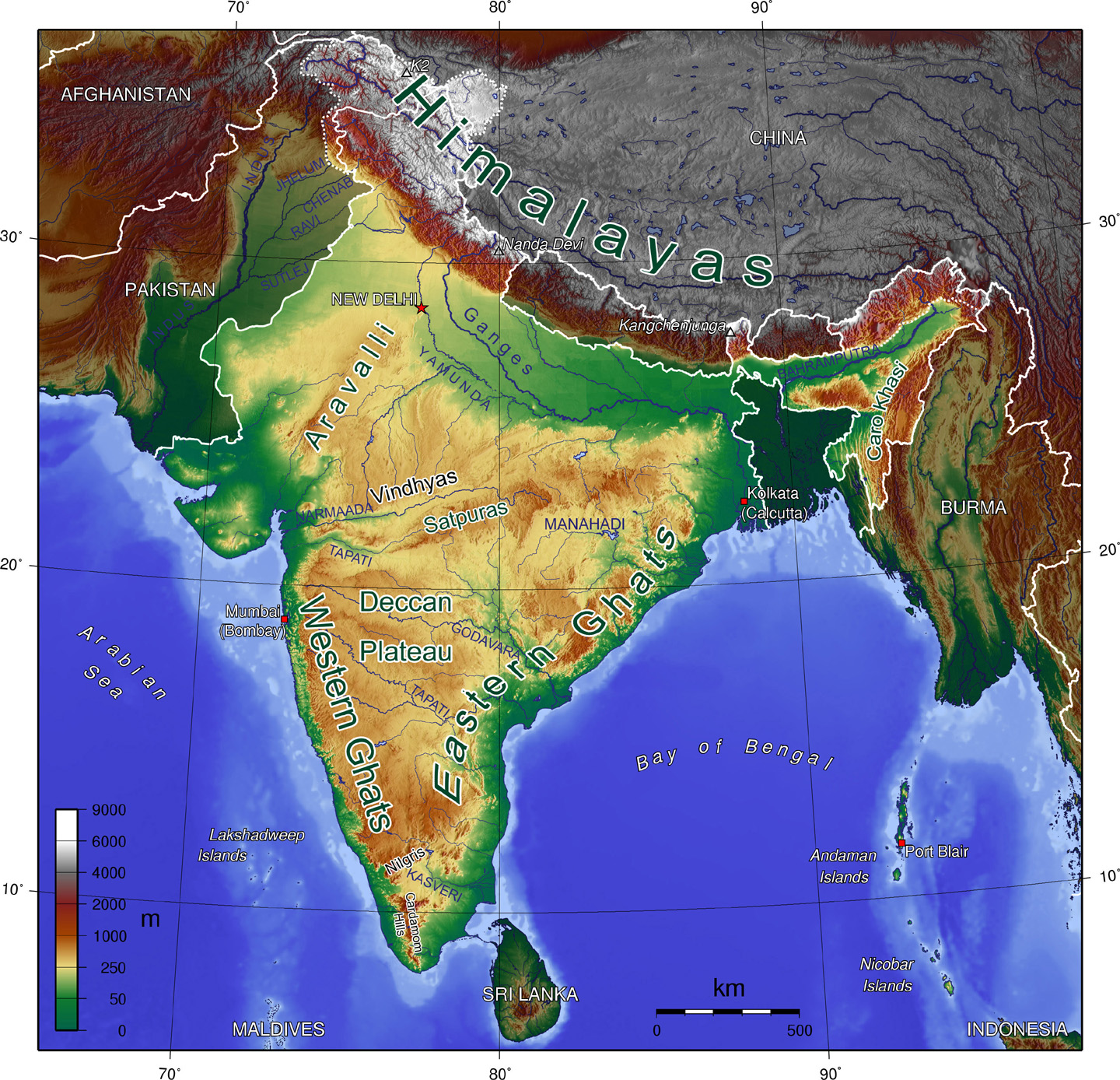
Geographical features of the Indian subcontinent.

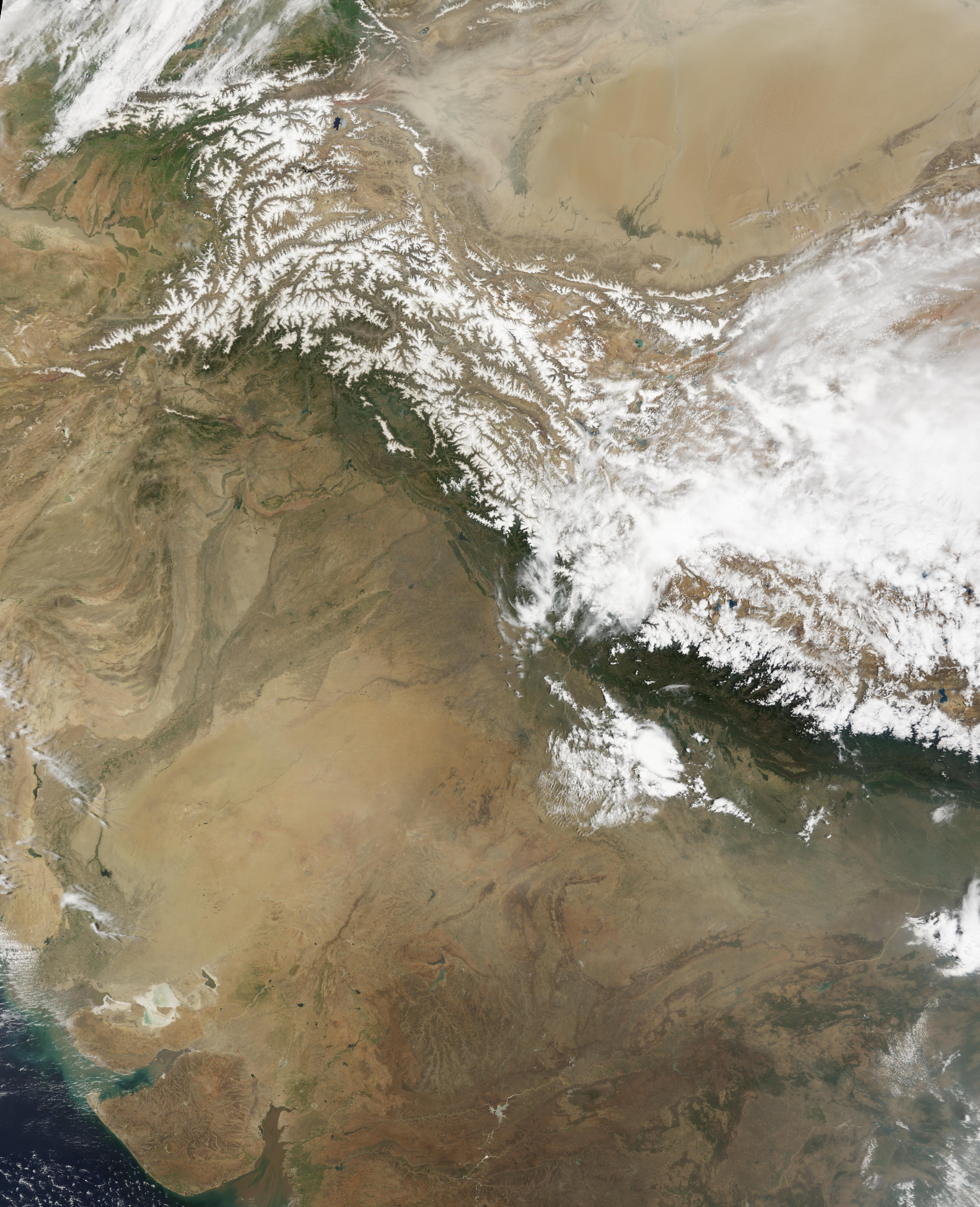
Daytime scene showing the pre-monsoon air over India.

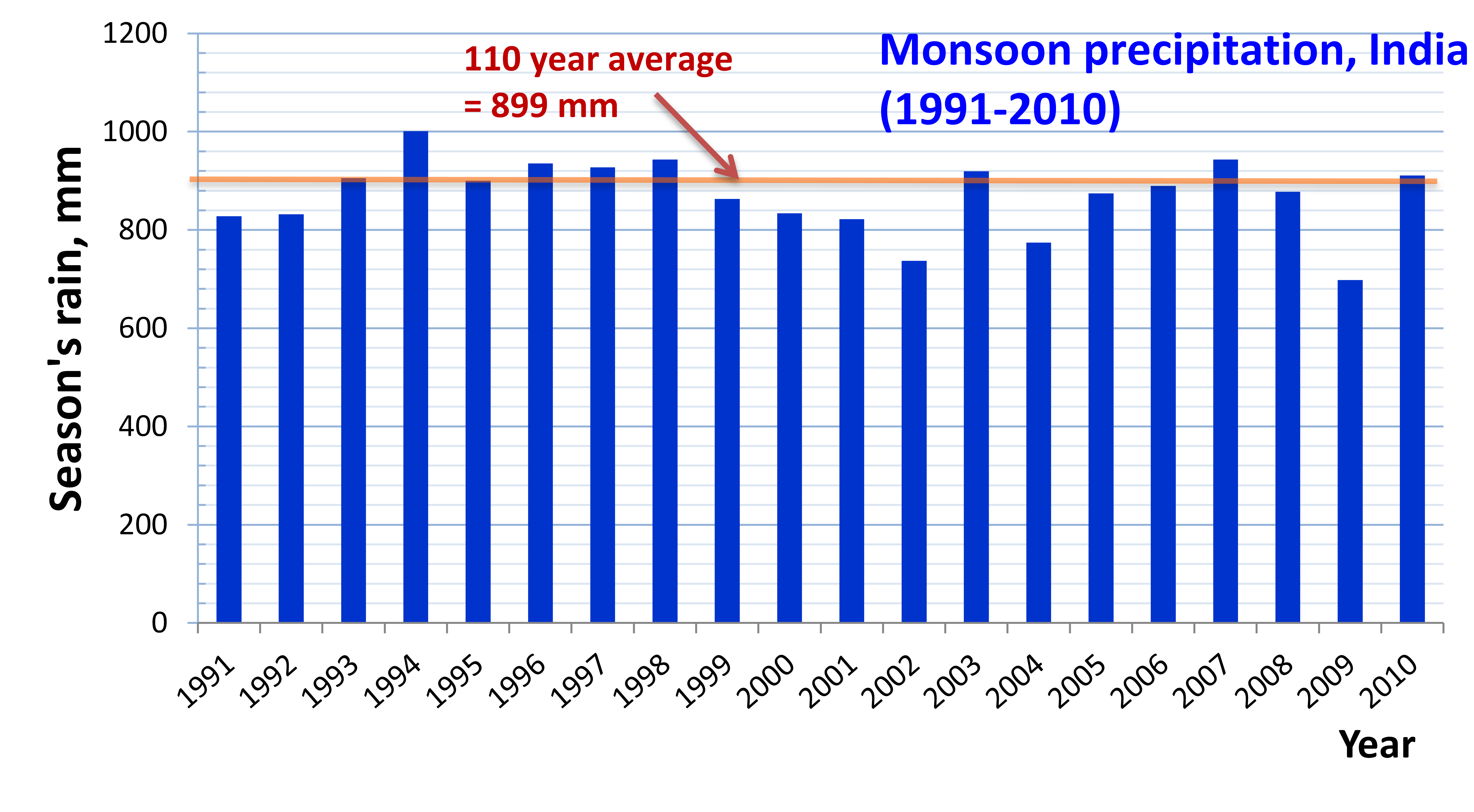
Recent trends in average annual precipitation from monsoons.

== Features of monsoon rains ==
There are some unique features of the rains that the monsoon brings to the Indian subcontinent.

=== "Bursting" ===
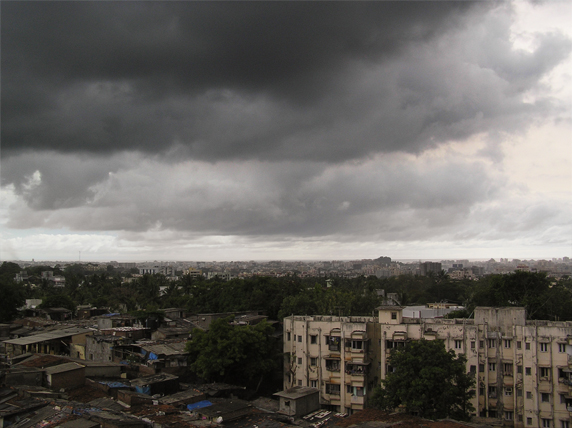
"Monsoon burst" over Mumbai

Bursting of monsoon refers to the sudden change in weather conditions in India (typically from hot and dry weather to wet and humid weather during the southwest monsoon), characterized by an abrupt rise in the mean daily rainfall. Similarly, the burst of the northeast monsoon refers to an abrupt increase in the mean daily rainfall over the affected regions.

=== Rain variability ("vagaries") ===
One of the most commonly used words to describe the erratic nature of the monsoon is "vagaries", used in newspapers, magazines, books, web portals to insurance plans, and India's budget discussions. In some years, it rains too much, causing floods in parts of India; in others, it rains too little or not at all, causing droughts. In some years, the rain quantity is sufficient but its timing arbitrary. Sometimes, despite average annual rainfall, the daily distribution or geographic distribution of the rain is substantially skewed. In the recent past, rainfall variability in short time periods (about a week) were attributed to desert dust over the Arabian Sea and Western Asia.

== Ideal and normal monsoon rains ==
Annual average rainfall in India

Normally, the southwest monsoon can be expected to "burst" onto the western coast of India (near Thiruvananthapuram) at the beginning of June and to cover the entire country by mid-July. Its withdrawal from India typically starts at the beginning of September and finishes by the beginning of October.

The northeast monsoon usually "bursts" around 20 October and lasts for about 50 days before withdrawing.

However, a rainy monsoon is not necessarily a normal monsoon – that is, one that performs close to statistical averages calculated over a long period. A normal monsoon is generally accepted to be one involving close to the average quantity of precipitation over all the geographical locations under its influence (mean spatial distribution) and over the entire expected time period (mean temporal distribution). Additionally, the arrival date and the departure date of both the southwest and northeast monsoon should be close to the mean dates. The exact criteria for a normal monsoon are defined by the India Meteorological Department with calculations for the mean and standard deviation of each of these variables.

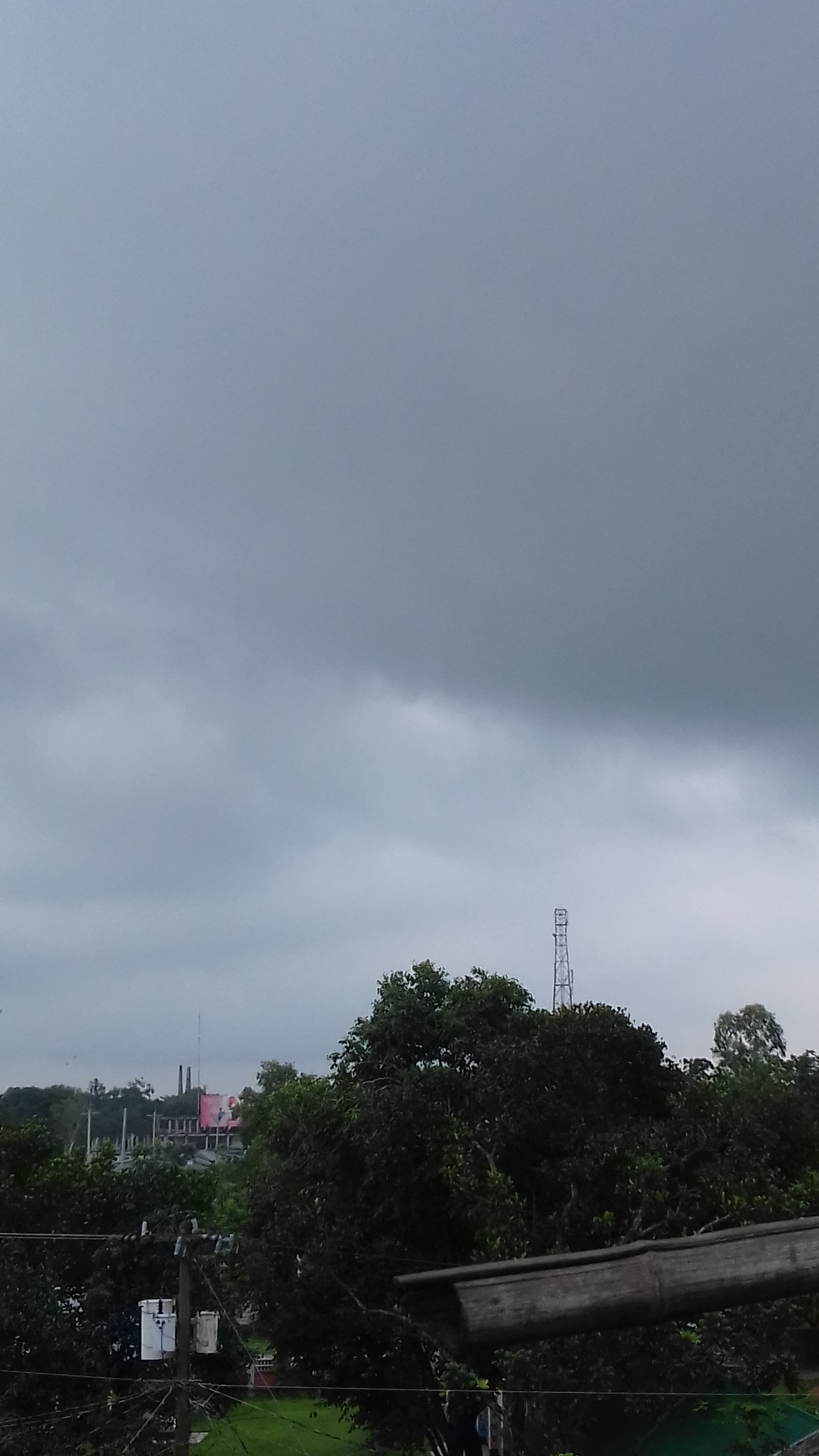
Monsoon clouds over Taraganj, Rangpur, Bangladesh

== Theories for mechanism of monsoon ==
Theories of the mechanism of the monsoon primarily try to explain the reasons for the seasonal reversal of winds and the timing of their reversal.

=== Traditional theory ===
Because of differences in the specific heat capacity of land and water, continents heat up faster than seas. Consequently, the air above coastal lands heats up faster than the air above seas. These create areas of low air pressure above coastal lands compared with pressure over the seas, causing winds to flow from the seas onto the neighboring lands. This is known as sea breeze.

==== Process of monsoon creation ====
A: sea breeze; B: land breeze

Also known as the thermal theory or the differential heating of sea and land theory, the traditional theory portrays the monsoon as a large-scale sea breeze. It states that during the hot subtropical summers, the massive landmass of the Indian Peninsula heats up at a different rate than the surrounding seas, resulting in a pressure gradient from south to north. This causes the flow of moisture-laden winds from sea to land. On reaching land, these winds rise because of the geographical relief, cooling adiabatically and leading to orographic rains. This is the southwest monsoon. The reverse happens during the winter, when the land is colder than the sea, establishing a pressure gradient from land to sea. This causes the winds to blow over the Indian subcontinent toward the Indian Ocean in a northeasterly direction, causing the northeast monsoon. Because the southwest monsoon flows from sea to land, it carries more moisture, and therefore causes more rain, than the northeast monsoon. Only part of the northeast monsoon passing over the Bay of Bengal picks up moisture, causing rain in Andhra Pradesh and Tamil Nadu during the winter months.

However, many meteorologists argue that the monsoon is not a local phenomenon as explained by the traditional theory, but a general weather phenomenon along the entire tropical zone of Earth. This criticism does not deny the role of differential heating of sea and land in generating monsoon winds, but casts it as one of several factors rather than the only one.

=== Dynamic theory ===
The atmospheric circulation system with associated pressure belts and latitudes.

The prevailing winds of the atmospheric circulation arise because of the difference in pressure at various latitudes and act as means for distribution of thermal energy on the planet. This pressure difference is because of the differences in solar insolation received at different latitudes and the resulting uneven heating of the planet. Alternating belts of high pressure and low pressure develop along the equator, the two tropics, the Arctic Circle and Antarctic Circle, and the two polar regions, giving rise to the trade winds, the westerlies, and the polar easterlies. However, geophysical factors like Earth's orbit, its rotation, and its axial tilt cause these belts to shift gradually north and south, following the Sun's seasonal shifts.

==== Process of monsoon creation ====
The dynamic theory explains the monsoon on the basis of the annual shifts in the position of global belts of pressure and winds. According to this theory, the monsoon is a result of the shift of the Intertropical Convergence Zone (ITCZ) under the influence of the vertical sun. Though the mean position of the ITCZ is taken as the equator, it shifts north and south with the migration of the vertical sun toward the Tropics of Cancer and Capricorn during the summer of the respective hemispheres (Northern and Southern Hemisphere). As such, during the northern summer (May and June), the ITCZ moves north, along with the vertical sun, toward the Tropic of Cancer. The ITCZ, as the zone of lowest pressure in the tropical region, is the target destination for the trade winds of both hemispheres. Consequently, with the ITCZ at the Tropic of Cancer, the southeast trade winds of the Southern Hemisphere have to cross the equator to reach it. (Note: When the southeast trade winds cross the equator, they are perceived in the Northern Hemisphere as equatorial westerlies because they seem to blow from the equator toward the Tropic of Cancer. Similarly, when the ITCZ is at the Tropic of Cancer, the northeast trade winds are confined to the area north of the Tropic of Cancer.) However, because of the Coriolis effect (which causes winds in the Northern Hemisphere to turn right, whereas winds in the Southern Hemisphere turn left), these southeast trade winds are deflected east in the Northern Hemisphere, transforming into southwest trades. (Note: Change of direction or origin of winds alters their nomenclature as noted above.) These pick up moisture while traveling from sea to land and cause orographic rain once they hit the highlands of the Indian Peninsula. This results in the southwest monsoon.

The dynamic theory explains the monsoon as a global weather phenomenon rather than just a local one. And when coupled with the traditional theory (based on the heating of sea and land), it enhances the explanation of the varying intensity of monsoon precipitation along the coastal regions with orographic barriers.

=== Jet stream theory ===
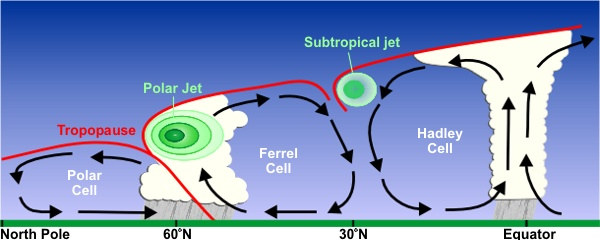
Jet streams of Earth

This theory tries to explain the establishment of the northeast and southwest monsoons, as well as unique features like "bursting" and variability.

The jet streams are systems of upper-air westerlies. They give rise to slowly moving upper-air waves, with 250-knot winds in some air streams. First observed by World War II pilots, they develop just below the tropopause over areas of steep pressure gradient on the surface. The main types are the polar jets, the subtropical westerly jets, and the less common tropical easterly jets. They follow the principle of geostrophic winds. (Note: Geostrophic winds blow parallel to the isobars and keep low-pressure zones to their left in the Northern Hemisphere and to their right in the Southern Hemisphere. The reversal is a result of the Coriolis effect.)

==== Process of monsoon creation ====
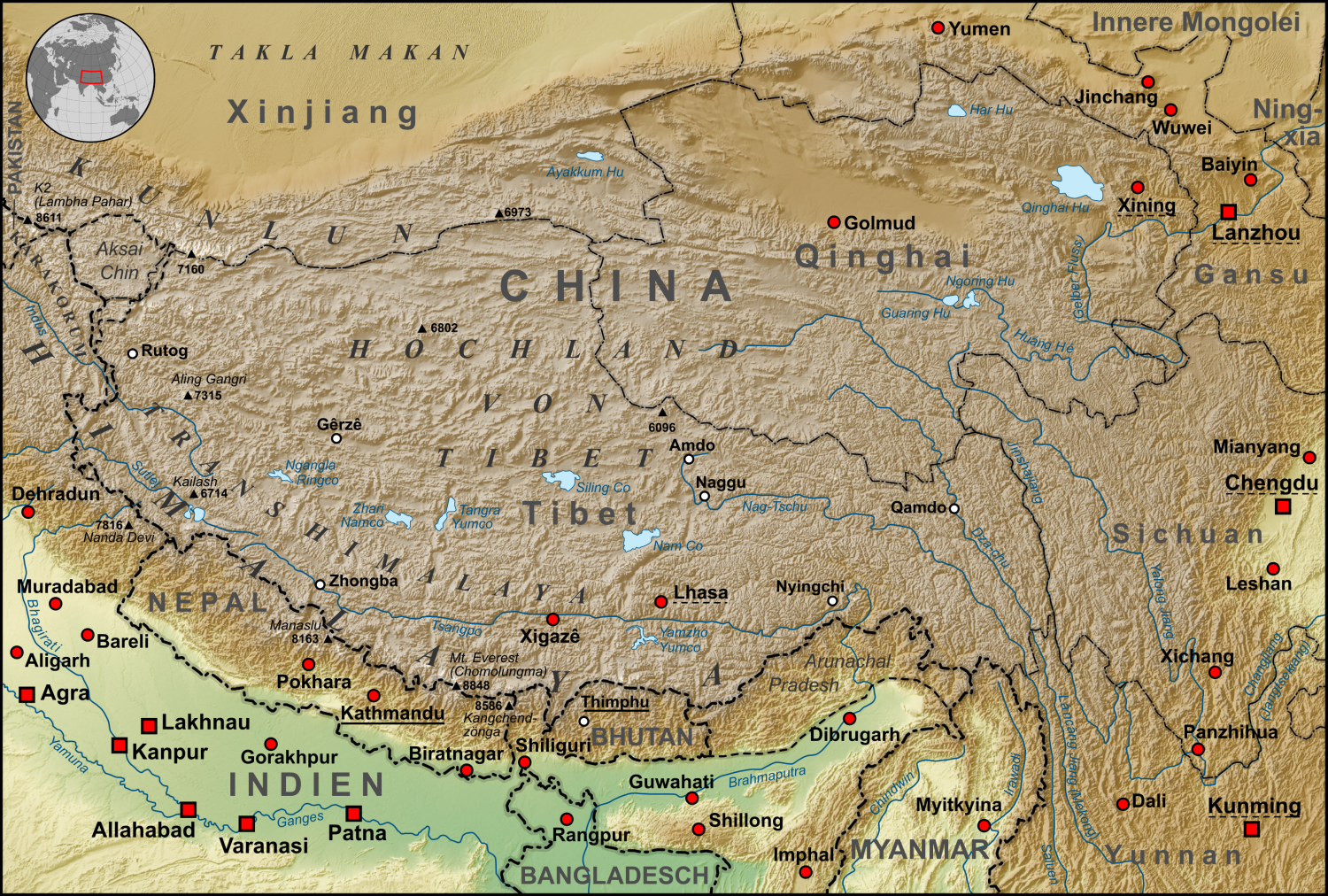
The Tibetan Plateau lies north of the Himalayas

Over India, a subtropical westerly jet develops in the winter season and is replaced by the tropical easterly jet in the summer season. The high temperature during the summer over the Tibetan Plateau, as well as over Central Asia in general, is believed to be the critical factor leading to the formation of the tropical easterly jet over India.

The mechanism affecting the monsoon is that the westerly jet causes high pressure over northern parts of the subcontinent during the winter. This results in the north-to-south flow of the winds in the form of the northeast monsoon. With the northward shift of the vertical sun, this jet shifts north, too. The intense heat over the Tibetan Plateau, coupled with associated terrain features like the high altitude of the plateau, generate the tropical easterly jet over central India. This jet creates a low-pressure zone over the northern Indian plains, influencing the wind flow toward these plains and assisting the development of the southwest monsoon.

== Theories for "bursting" ==
The "bursting" of the monsoon is primarily explained by the jet stream theory and the dynamic theory.

=== Dynamic theory ===
According to this theory, during the summer months in the Northern Hemisphere, the ITCZ shifts north, pulling the southwest monsoon winds onto the land from the sea. However, the huge landmass of the Himalayas restricts the low-pressure zone onto the Himalayas themselves. It is only when the Tibetan Plateau heats up significantly more than the Himalayas that the ITCZ rises abruptly and swiftly shifts north, leading to the bursting of monsoon rains over the Indian subcontinent. The reverse shift takes place for the northeast monsoon winds, leading to a second, minor burst of rainfall over the eastern Indian Peninsula during the Northern Hemisphere winter months.

=== Jet stream theory ===
According to this theory, the onset of the southwest monsoon is driven by the shift of the subtropical westerly jet north from over the plains of India toward the Tibetan Plateau. This shift is due to the intense heating of the plateau during the summer months. The northward shift is not a slow and gradual process, as expected for most changes in weather pattern. The primary cause is believed to be the height of the Himalayas. As the Tibetan Plateau heats up, the low pressure created over it pulls the westerly jet north. Because of the lofty Himalayas, the westerly jet's movement is inhibited. But with continuous dropping pressure, sufficient force is created for the movement of the westerly jet across the Himalayas after a significant period. As such, the shift of the jet is sudden and abrupt, causing the bursting of southwest monsoon rains onto the Indian plains. The reverse shift happens for the northeast monsoon.

== Theories for monsoon variability ==
=== The jet stream effect ===
The jet stream theory also explains the variability in timing and strength of the monsoon.

Timing: A timely northward shift of the subtropical westerly jet at the beginning of summer is critical to the onset of the southwest monsoon over India. If the shift is delayed, so is the southwest monsoon. An early shift results in an early monsoon.
Strength: The strength of the southwest monsoon is determined by the strength of the easterly tropical jet over central India. A strong easterly tropical jet results in a strong southwest monsoon over central India, and a weak jet results in a weak monsoon.

=== El Niño–Southern Oscillation effect ===
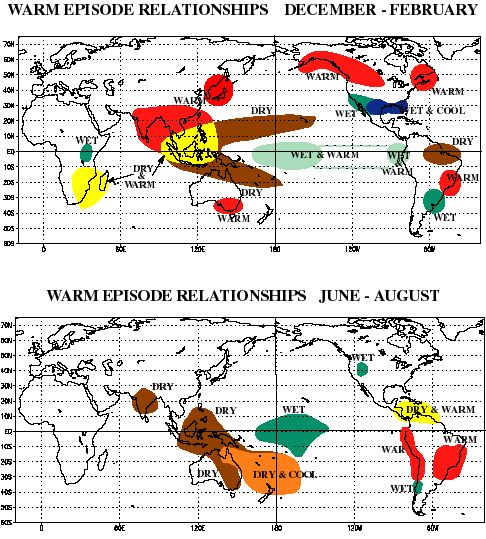
Effects of El Niño on the weather of the subcontinent

El Niño is a warm ocean current originating along the coast of Peru that replaces the usual cold Humboldt Current. The warm surface water moving toward the coast of Peru with El Niño is pushed west by the trade winds, thereby raising the temperature of the southern Pacific Ocean. The reverse condition is known as La Niña.

Southern Oscillation, a phenomenon first observed by Sir Gilbert Walker, director general of observatories in India, refers to the seesaw relationship of atmospheric pressures between Tahiti and Darwin, Australia. Walker noticed that when pressure was high in Tahiti, it was low in Darwin, and vice versa. A Southern Oscillation Index (SOI), based on the pressure difference between Tahiti and Darwin, has been formulated by the Bureau of Meteorology (Australia) to measure the strength of the oscillation. Walker noticed that the quantity of rainfall in the Indian subcontinent was often negligible in years of high pressure over Darwin (and low pressure over Tahiti). Conversely, low pressure over Darwin bodes well for precipitation quantity in India. Thus, Walker established the relationship between southern oscillation and quantities of monsoon rains in India.

Ultimately, the southern oscillation was found to be simply an atmospheric component of the El Niño/La Niña effect, which happens in the ocean. Therefore, in the context of the monsoon, the two together came to be known as the El Niño–Southern Oscillation (ENSO) effect. The effect is known to have a pronounced influence on the strength of the southwest monsoon over India, with the monsoon being weak (causing droughts) during El Niño years, while La Niña years bring particularly strong monsoons.

=== Indian Ocean dipole effect ===
Although the ENSO effect was statistically effective in explaining several past droughts in India, in recent decades, its relationship with the Indian monsoon seemed to weaken. For example, the strong El niño of 1997 did not cause drought in India. However, it was later discovered that, just like ENSO in the Pacific Ocean, a similar seesaw ocean-atmosphere system in the Indian Ocean was also in play. This system was discovered in 1999 and named the Indian Ocean Dipole (IOD). An index to calculate it was also formulated. IOD develops in the equatorial region of the Indian Ocean from April to May and peaks in October. With a positive IOD, winds over the Indian Ocean blow from east to west. This makes the Arabian Sea (the western Indian Ocean near the African coast) much warmer and the eastern Indian Ocean around Indonesia colder and drier. In negative dipole years, the reverse happens, making Indonesia much warmer and rainier.

A positive IOD index often negates the effect of ENSO, resulting in increased monsoon rains in years such as 1983, 1994, and 1997. Further, the two poles of the IOD – the eastern pole (around Indonesia) and the western pole (off the African coast) — independently and cumulatively affect the quantity of monsoon rains.

==== Equatorial Indian Ocean oscillation ====
As with ENSO, the atmospheric component of the IOD was later discovered and the cumulative phenomenon named Equatorial Indian Ocean oscillation (EQUINOO). When EQUINOO effects are factored in, certain failed forecasts, like the acute drought of 2002, can be further accounted for. The relationship between extremes of the Indian summer monsoon rainfall, along with ENSO and EQUINOO, have been studied, and models to better predict the quantity of monsoon rains have been statistically derived.

== Impact of climate change ==
Since 1950s, the South Asian summer monsoon has been exhibiting large changes, especially in terms of droughts and floods. The observed monsoon rainfall indicates a gradual decline over central India, with a reduction of up to 10%. This is primarily due to a weakening monsoon circulation as a result of the rapid warming in the Indian Ocean, and changes in land use and land cover, while the role of aerosols remains elusive. Since the strength of the monsoon is partially dependent on the temperature difference between the ocean and the land, higher ocean temperatures in the Indian Ocean have weakened the moisture bearing winds from the ocean to the land. The reduction in the summer monsoon rainfall has grave consequences over central India because at least 60% of the agriculture in this region is still largely rain-fed.

A recent assessment of the monsoonal changes indicates that the land warming has increased during 2002–2014, possibly reviving the strength of the monsoon circulation and rainfall. Future changes in the monsoon will depend on a competition between land and ocean—on which is warming faster than the other.

Meanwhile, there has been a three-fold rise in widespread extreme rainfall events during the years 1950 to 2015, over the entire central belt of India, leading to a steady rise in the number of flash floods with significant socioeconomic losses. Widespread extreme rainfall events are those rainfall events which are larger than 150 mm/day and spread over a region large enough to cause floods.

== Monsoon rain prediction models ==
Since the Great Famine of 1876–1878 in India, various attempts have been made to predict monsoon rainfall. At least five prediction models exist.

=== Seasonal Prediction of Indian Monsoon (SPIM) ===
The Centre for Development of Advanced Computing (CDAC) at Bengaluru facilitated the Seasonal Prediction of Indian Monsoon (SPIM) experiment on the PARAM Padma supercomputing system. This project involved simulated runs of historical data from 1985 to 2004 to try to establish the relationship of five atmospheric general circulation models with monsoon rainfall distribution.

=== India Meteorological Department model ===
The department has tried to forecast the monsoon for India since 1884, and is the only official agency entrusted with making public forecasts about the quantity, distribution, and timing of the monsoon rains. Its position as the sole authority on the monsoon was cemented in 2005 by the Department of Science and Technology (DST), New Delhi. In 2003, IMD substantially changed its forecast methodology, model, and administration. A sixteen-parameter monsoon forecasting model used since 1988 was replaced in 2003. However, following the 2009 drought in India (worst since 1972), The department decided in 2010 that it needed to develop an "indigenous model" to further improve its prediction capabilities.

== Significance ==
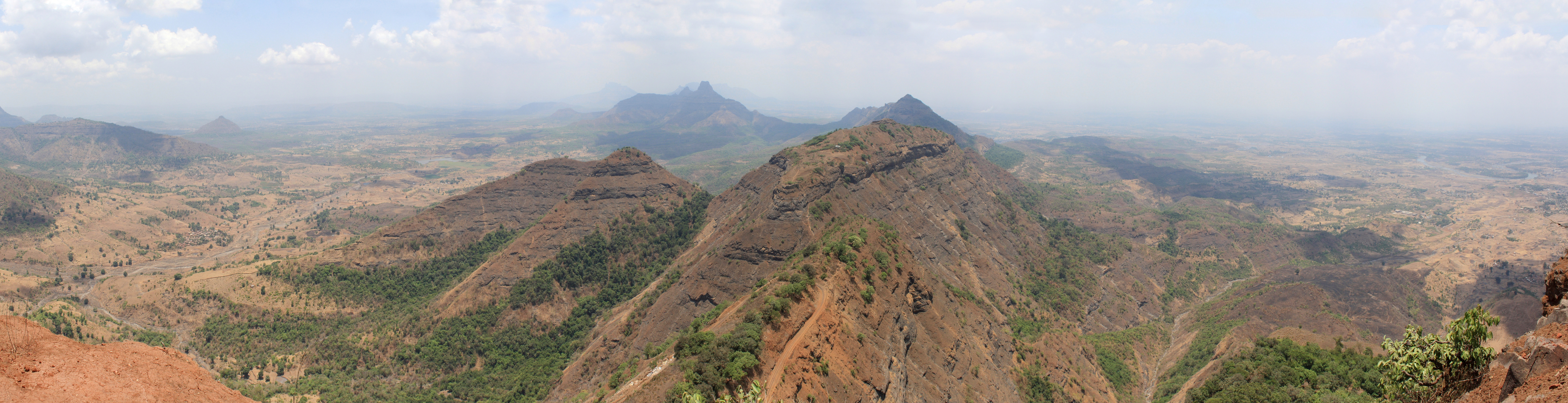
Western Ghats, Maharashtra on 28 May in dry season

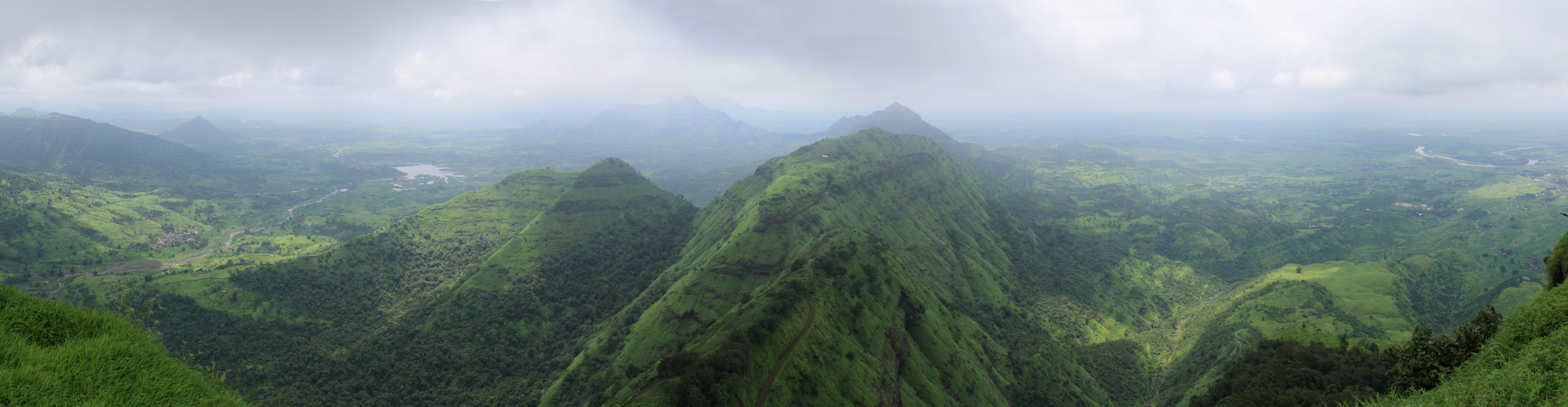
Western Ghats, Maharashtra on 28 August in rainy season

The monsoon is the primary delivery mechanism for fresh water in the Indian subcontinent. As such, it affects the environment (and associated flora, fauna, and ecosystems), agriculture, society, hydro-power production, and geography of the subcontinent (like the availability of fresh water in water bodies and the underground water table), with all of these factors cumulatively contributing to the health of the economy of affected countries.

The monsoon turns large parts of India from semi-deserts into green grasslands. See photos taken only three months apart in the Western Ghats.

=== Geographical (wettest spots on Earth) ===
Mawsynram and Cherrapunji, both in the Indian state of Meghalaya, alternate as the wettest places on Earth given the quantity of their rainfall, though there are other cities with similar claims. They receive more than 11,000 millimeters of rain each from the monsoon.

=== Agricultural ===
In India, which has historically had a primarily agrarian economy, the services sector recently overtook the farm sector in terms of GDP contribution. However, the agriculture sector still contributes 17–20% of GDP and is the largest employer in the country, with about 60% of Indians dependent on it for employment and livelihood. About 49% of India's land is agricultural; that number rises to 55% if associated wetlands, dryland farming areas, etc., are included. Because more than half of these farmlands are rain-fed, the monsoon is critical to food sufficiency and quality of life.

Despite progress in alternative forms of irrigation, agricultural dependence on the monsoon remains far from insignificant. Therefore, the agricultural calendar of India is governed by the monsoon. Any fluctuations in the time distribution, spatial distribution, or quantity of the monsoon rains may lead to floods or droughts, causing the agricultural sector to suffer. This has a cascading effect on the secondary economic sectors, the overall economy, food inflation, and therefore the general population's quality and cost of living.

=== Economic ===
The economic significance of the monsoon is aptly described by Pranab Mukherjee's remark that the monsoon is the "real finance minister of India". A good monsoon results in better agricultural yields, which brings down prices of essential food commodities and reduces imports, thus reducing food inflation overall. Better rains also result in increased hydroelectric production. All of these factors have positive ripple effects throughout the economy of India.

The down side however is that when monsoon rains are weak, crop production is low leading to higher food prices with limited supply. As a result, the Indian government is actively working with farmers and the nation's meteorological department to produce more drought resistant crops.

=== Health ===
The onset of the monsoon increases fungal and bacterial activity. A host of mosquito-borne, water-borne and air-borne infections become more common as a result of the change in the ecosystem. These include diseases such as dengue, malaria, cholera, and colds.

=== Social ===
D. Subbarao, former governor of the Reserve Bank of India, emphasized during a quarterly review of India's monetary policy that the lives of Indians depend on the performance of the monsoon. His own career prospects, his emotional well-being, and the performance of his monetary policy are all "a hostage" to the monsoon, he said, as is the case for most Indians. Additionally, farmers rendered jobless by failed monsoon rains tend to migrate to cities. This crowds city slums and aggravates the infrastructure and sustainability of city life.

=== Travel ===
In the past, Indians usually refrained from traveling during monsoons for practical as well as religious reasons. But with the advent of globalization, such travel is gaining popularity. Places like Kerala and the Western Ghats get a large number of tourists, both local and foreigners, during the monsoon season. Kerala is one of the top destinations for tourists interested in Ayurvedic treatments and massage therapy. One major drawback of traveling during the monsoon is that most wildlife sanctuaries are closed. Also, some mountainous areas, especially in Himalayan regions, get cut off when roads are damaged by landslides and floods during heavy rains.

=== Environmental ===
The monsoon is the primary bearer of fresh water to the area. The peninsular/Deccan rivers of India are mostly rain-fed and non-perennial in nature, depending primarily on the monsoon for water supply. Most of the coastal rivers of Western India are also rain-fed and monsoon-dependent. As such, the flora, fauna, and entire ecosystems of these areas rely heavily on the monsoon.

== See also ==
- East Asian Monsoon
- Monsoon (photographs) of India, 1960
- Climate of India (section Monsoon)
- Asian brown cloud
- Tropical monsoon climate (section Factors)
- Tibetan Plateau (section Role in monsoons)
- Himalayas (section Impact on climate)
- India Meteorological Department
- Drought in India
