= Piotr Flatau =

Polish-American atmospheric physicist

Piotr Jacek Flatau
- Born: 1953
- Education: University of Warsaw (MSc, habilitation); Colorado State University (MSc, PhD)
- Known for: DDSCAT, discrete dipole approximation
- Scientific career
- Fields: Atmospheric physics, cloud physics, tropical dynamics, radiative transfer
- Workplaces: University of Warsaw; Colorado State University; Scripps Institution of Oceanography
- Thesis: Scattering by irregular particles in anomalous diffraction and discrete dipole approximations (1992)
- Doctoral advisor: William R. Cotton; Graeme Stephens
- Website: pflatau.scrippsprofiles.ucsd.edu

Piotr Jacek Flatau (born 1953) is a Polish-American atmospheric physicist and professor of physical sciences. His research concerns cloud microphysics, radiative transfer, tropical dynamics, and electromagnetic scattering. With astrophysicist Bruce T. Draine, he co-developed DDSCAT, a widely used implementation of the discrete dipole approximation for calculating scattering and absorption by irregular particles. His other work includes contributions to cloud-microphysics parameterizations and research on tropical aerosols, equatorial waves, and extreme rainfall. He has worked at the Scripps Institution of Oceanography, University of California, San Diego (UC San Diego), since 1992 and was elected a foreign member of the Polish Academy of Sciences in 2017. Outside atmospheric science, Flatau has edited books and contributed translations and songs to theatrical and documentary projects concerning Polish scientific, literary, and interwar cultural history.

== Early life and education ==
Flatau was born in Poland in 1953. He graduated from the Tadeusz Reytan School in Warsaw in 1972. In 1977 he received an MSc in theoretical physics from the Faculty of Physics at the University of Warsaw, where his supervisor was Jerzy Mycielski. He then worked as an assistant professor at the faculty's Institute of Geophysics under Krzysztof Edward Haman. After moving to the United States in 1982, Flatau studied at Colorado State University. He received an MSc in atmospheric science in 1985 and a PhD in atmospheric science in 1992. His doctoral dissertation, Scattering by irregular particles in anomalous diffraction and discrete dipole approximations, was jointly supervised by William R. Cotton and Graeme Stephens. In 2012 Flatau received a habilitation degree in physics from the Faculty of Physics at the University of Warsaw, based on work concerning exact methods of single and multiple scattering.

== Career ==
Flatau joined the Climate, Atmospheric Science and Physical Oceanography division of Scripps Institution of Oceanography in 1992. At Scripps, he initially worked with Veerabhadran Ramanathan and Paul Crutzen on major climate field projects, including CEPEX, INDOEX, and MINOS. He is also a member of the scientific council of the Polish climate-education website Nauka o Klimacie.

== Research ==
=== Discrete dipole approximation and DDSCAT ===
Flatau and Draine began developing DDSCAT in 1990 at Princeton University. The software implements the discrete dipole approximation to calculate electromagnetic scattering and absorption by targets such as ice crystals, dust, soot, and marine phytoplankton. Their 1994 description of the method appeared in the Journal of the Optical Society of America A. Later versions extended the method to periodic targets. An independent review described DDSCAT as the publicly available program that helped popularize the discrete dipole approximation.

=== Cloud physics and microphysical parameterization ===
Flatau contributed to the Colorado State University Regional Atmospheric Modeling System cloud-microphysics module and, with Johannes Verlinde and William R. Cotton, derived analytical solutions for particle-collection growth used in bulk parameterizations. The Thompson microphysics scheme for the Weather Research and Forecasting Model and MM5 cited this work, while Jerry M. Straka's textbook drew on the RAMS module. He also studied the radiative effects of cirrus clouds. Flatau also worked with the United States Naval Research Laboratory on aerosol modelling and high-resolution radar studies of clouds near the Kennedy Space Center. With Jerome M. Schmidt and colleagues, he reported radar observations of individual raindrops in the free atmosphere. With Schmidt and Paul R. Harasti, he proposed "mixed-phase nimbostratus uncinus" as a separate subclass of nimbostratus cloud, characterized by billow cloud structure, shallow circulation, and slanted periodic rain shafts.

=== Tropical dynamics ===
Flatau has studied interactions between the tropical ocean and atmosphere, including the Madden–Julian oscillation, monsoon onset, equatorial waves, and tropical cyclogenesis. With collaborators, he linked interactions between convectively coupled Kelvin and equatorial Rossby waves to extreme rainfall and flooding in southwest Sulawesi, finding that the waves' combined activity substantially increased the probability of such events.

=== Field projects ===
Flatau participated in the Central Equatorial Pacific Experiment (CEPEX) in 1993, where research he co-authored quantified the radiative effects of tropical convection, and in the 1999 Indian Ocean Experiment (INDOEX), where lidar observations characterized vertical aerosol-extinction profiles. During the Mediterranean Intensive Oxidant Study (MINOS) on Crete in 2001, he co-authored studies of aerosol radiative forcing and long-range pollution transport over the Mediterranean. In the 2004 United Arab Emirates Unified Aerosol Experiment (UAE^{2}), Flatau was principal investigator for aerosol-scattering and radiative-forcing research, and he also worked on satellite ocean-colour validation through NASA's SIMBIOS project. In 2018–2019 he was an NSF co-principal investigator for the Equatorial Line Observations campaign, which examined equatorial Kelvin waves; related research studied meteorological drivers of floods on Sumatra.

== Historical and literary work ==
Flatau is a grandson of neurologist Edward Flatau and a son of physician Joanna Flatau.

=== Books and publishing ===
Flatau has edited books on the history of science, literature, and music. With Katarzyna Zimek, he edited Kilka wierszy Władysława Szlengla (Several Poems by Władysław Szlengel, 2020), a collection of prewar work by Władysław Szlengel. His Edward Flatau i jego dwie córki concerns the neurologist, his family, and the beginnings of Polish neurology. In 2024 Flatau edited a commemorative volume about atmospheric physicist Krzysztof Edward Haman. His Tango: Reportaże z przeszłości (Tango: Reports from the Past) traces Polish tango and its movement between continents.

=== Theatre, music, and film ===
Flatau translated Argentine tango lyrics into Polish for the 2014 musical Tango FM and for concerts by singer Olga Avigail Mieleszczuk. He also adapted songs for plays by Steve Hauk and Tomasz Lerski. He wrote the screenplay for the 2025 documentary Edward Flatau i jego dwie córki, contributed to the BBC Radio 3 documentary Tango Goes East, and wrote the Polish popular-science blog Fizyka Klimatu from 2010 to 2016.

== Sailing and meteorology ==
Flatau was involved in sailing from his youth and later joined the Polish Yacht Club of San Francisco. Beginning in 2005, he and Bogumił Jakubiak provided weather forecasting assistance to Poland's 470-class sailing team. In 2006 he prepared forecasts for the Polish national team during a pre-Olympic regatta in Qingdao, China. In 2011–2012 he worked as a meteorologist during Roman Paszke's attempt to sail around the world from east to west in the catamaran Gemini 3.

== Honors and memberships ==
Flatau received the Polish state title of professor of physical sciences on 2 December 2016. In 2017 he was elected a foreign member of the Polish Academy of Sciences.
