= Spinning dust =

In astronomy, spinning dust emission is a mechanism proposed to explain anomalous microwave emission from the Milky Way. The emission could arise from the electric dipole of very rapidly spinning (10–60 GHz) extremely small (nanometer) dust grains as suggested by Bruce T. Draine and Alex Lazarian in 1998, most likely polycyclic aromatic hydrocarbons. The anomalous emission was first discovered as a by-product of Cosmic Microwave Background observations which make very sensitive measurements of the microwave sky which have to identify and remove contamination from the galaxy. The smallest dust grains are thought to have only hundreds of atoms.

== History ==
Anomalous microwave emission was first seen as a surprising statistical correlation of microwave sky variations with far infrared (FIR) emission (Kogut et al. 1996, Leitch et al. 1997). This signal traced the warm galactic dust emission which was unexpected as the extrapolated infrared dust signal to microwave frequencies should have been at least an order of magnitude lower than that seen. Kogut et al. had correlated COBE Differential Microwave Radiometer observations at centimeter wavelengths with DIRBE dust emission at 140 μm, while Leitch et al. had correlated Owens Valley Radio Observatory ring observations at 14.5 and 32 GHz with IRAS 100 μm. The suggestion at the time was the correlation was due to free-free or Bremsstrahlung emission from ionized gas caused by young hot stars which are formed in these dusty regions.

== Physics ==
Small dust grains are likely to have a permanent electric dipole moment μ due to the intrinsic dipole moment of molecules within the grain and uneven charge distribution. Interactions with the ambient gas and radiation field cause the grains to spin. Denoting by ω their (vector) angular velocity, and assuming the grains to be spherical for simplicity (so they are not wobbling), Larmor's formula gives the power radiated by such a rotating dipole:

$P(\omega) = \frac23 \frac{\ddot{\boldsymbol{\mu}}^2}{c^3} = \frac23 \frac{\omega^4 \mu_{\bot}^2}{c^3},$

where μ_{⊥} is the component of μ perpendicular to ω. This power is radiated at the rotation frequency, ν = ω/(2 π). In order to compute the emissivity due to this radiation process, one requires the probability distribution function f(ω) for the rotation rate ω, as well as the number density of dust grains. Both functions depend on the grain size, and so does the dipole moment μ. The distribution function f(ω) depends on the ambient gas temperature, density and ionization fraction and on the local radiation field. Refined models (Hoang et al. 2010) account for the wobbling of non-spherical dust grains, in which case the angular velocity is not constant for a given angular momentum and power is radiated at multiple frequencies.
