= Teri (geology) =

Coastal dune complex in southeastern India

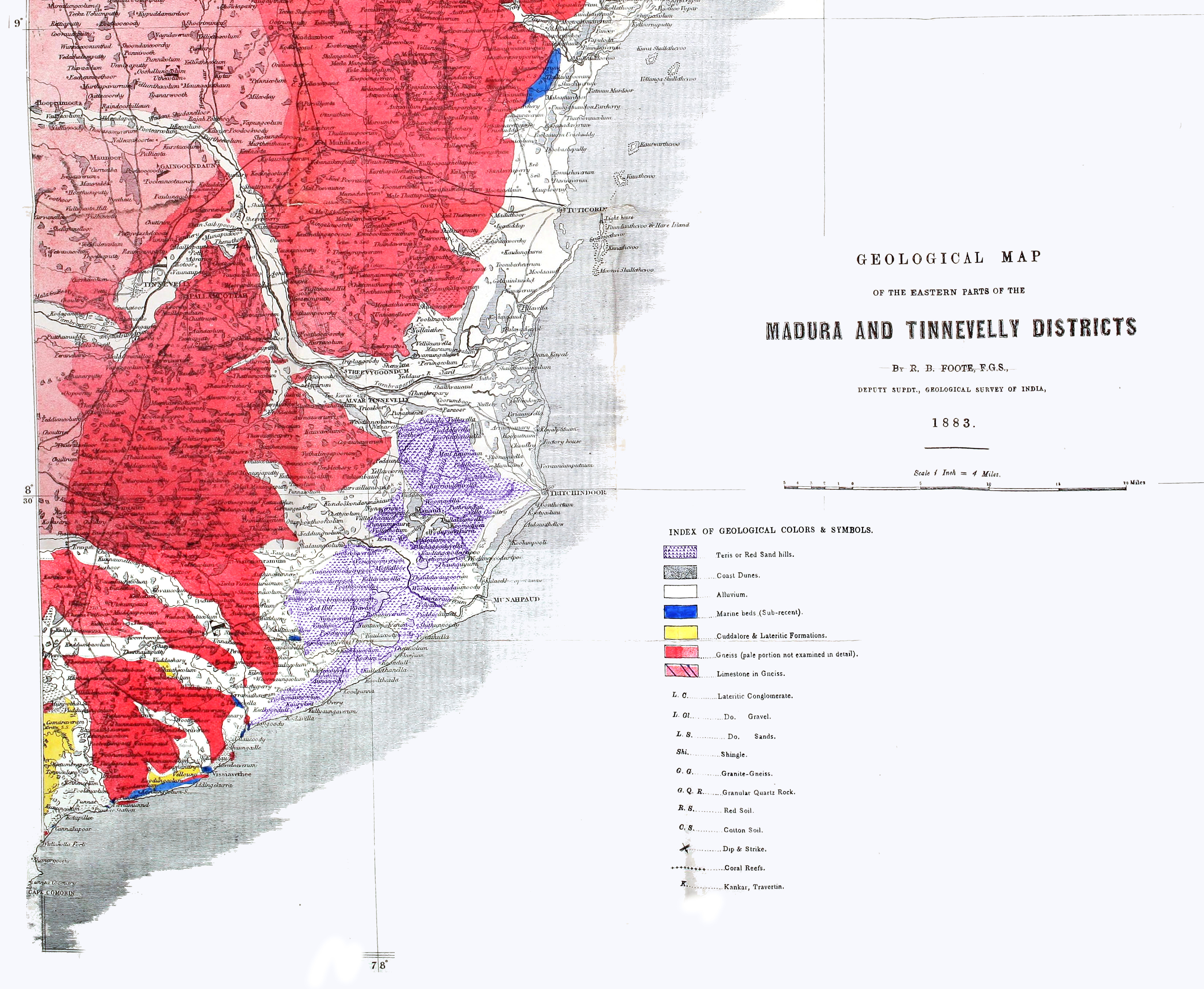
Geological map of southeastern India showing teri zone (marked in blue caret patterning)

Teri or Teri dune complex is a coastal landscape peculiar to some parts of Tamil Nadu mainly in southeastern India. The landscape consists of sediments dating to the Quaternary Period and made of marine deposits with aeolianite and characteristic red sand and silt dunes. These red soils are thought to have originated in the Pleistocene. Robert Bruce Foote hypothesized that these dunes were created by the action of winds (aeolian) lifting the fine silt fraction from further east. These dunes are oriented along the axis running parallel to the coast and between the latitudes of 8°00′ to 9°30′ N and longitudes 77°18′ to 79°00′ E. The soils also have calcium deposits replacing the old roots of vegetation. The soil is rich in ilmenite and the red colour is derived from haematite originating from garnet.

== See also ==
- Geography of South India
- Thar Desert, sand desert of western India
- Great Rann of Kutch, Salt desert of India
- Glacial desert of India
