= Alexandre Lazarian =

American astrophysicist

- Education: University of Cambridge
- Known for: Research on magnetohydrodynamics
- Scientific career
- Fields: Astrophysics
- Thesis: Statistical Study of Astrophysical Processes (1994)
- Website: www.astro.wisc.edu/staff/lazarian-alex/

Alexandre Lazarian is a theoretical astrophysicist. He is a professor of astronomy at the University of Wisconsin–Madison with a joint appointment at the Department of Physics. In 2010, he received the Humboldt Research Award from the Humboldt Foundation for his outstanding research on astrophysical magnetic fields and turbulence, solar flares, and cosmic rays. He received the 2021 Ronald C. Davidson Award for Plasma Physics from AIP Publishing. He is a fellow of the American Physical Society.

== Career and research ==
Alex Lazarian got his M.Sc. in Physics from the Moscow Physics and Technology Institute, where his advisor was Vitaly Ginzburg. He received his PhD in 1994 from University of Cambridge. After his PhD, Lazarian spent three years as a postdoc in Princeton University and one year as a Senior Fellow at Canadian Institute for Theoretical Astrophysics. Since 1998, he has been working as a professor at the University of Wisconsin–Madison. Professor Alex Lazarian is a world-leading expert on MHD turbulence, magnetic reconnection, dynamo theory, and interstellar dust, as well as developing innovative techniques to study magnetic fields.

In 1998, together with Bruce T. Draine, Lazarian proposed a spinning dust model that successfully explains the origin of anomalous microwave emission discovered by Cosmic Background Explorer.

In 1999, Lazarian proposed, with Ethan Vishniac, a turbulent magnetic reconnection model, which posits that reconnection gets fast and is independent of resistivity due to turbulence. This Lazarian-Vishniac model is successfully tested with numerical simulations and provides a universal solution of the magnetic reconnection in astrophysics as turbulence is ubiquitous in astrophysical environments.

In 2007, with Thiem Hoang, Lazarian introduced an analytical model of radiative torques (RAT) and RAT alignment theory, leading to the quantitative era of grain alignment. The RAT theory was successfully tested with observations and has become a foundational theory to interpret polarization data.

== Selected publications ==
- Lazarian, A; Vishniac, E. (1999-06-01). "Reconnection in a Weakly Stochastic Field". The Astrophysical Journal. 517 (1): 700. arXiv:astro-ph/9811037. Bibcode:1999ApJ...517..700L. doi:10.1086/307233. ISSN 0004-637X.
- Draine, B.T.; Lazarian, A. (1999-06-01). "Electric Dipole Radiation from Spinning Dust Grains". The Astrophysical Journal. 508 (1): 157. arXiv:astro-ph/9802239. Bibcode:1998ApJ...508..157D. doi:10.1086/306387. ISSN 0004-637X.
- Lazarian, A; Hoang, Thiem (2007-06-06). "Radiative torques: analytical model and basic properties". Monthly Notices of the Royal Astronomical Society. 378 (3): 910. arXiv:0707.0886. Bibcode:2007MNRAS.378..910L. doi:10.1111/j.1365-2966.2007.11817.x. ISSN 0004-637X.

== Honors and awards ==
- 2025 Fulbright US scholar
- 2021 Ronald C. Davidson Award for Plasma Physics
- 2012 Fellow of American Physical Society, American Physical Society (2012)
- 2010 Humbold Research Award, Alexander von Humboldt Foundation.
