= Veerabhadran Ramanathan =

Indian climate scientist

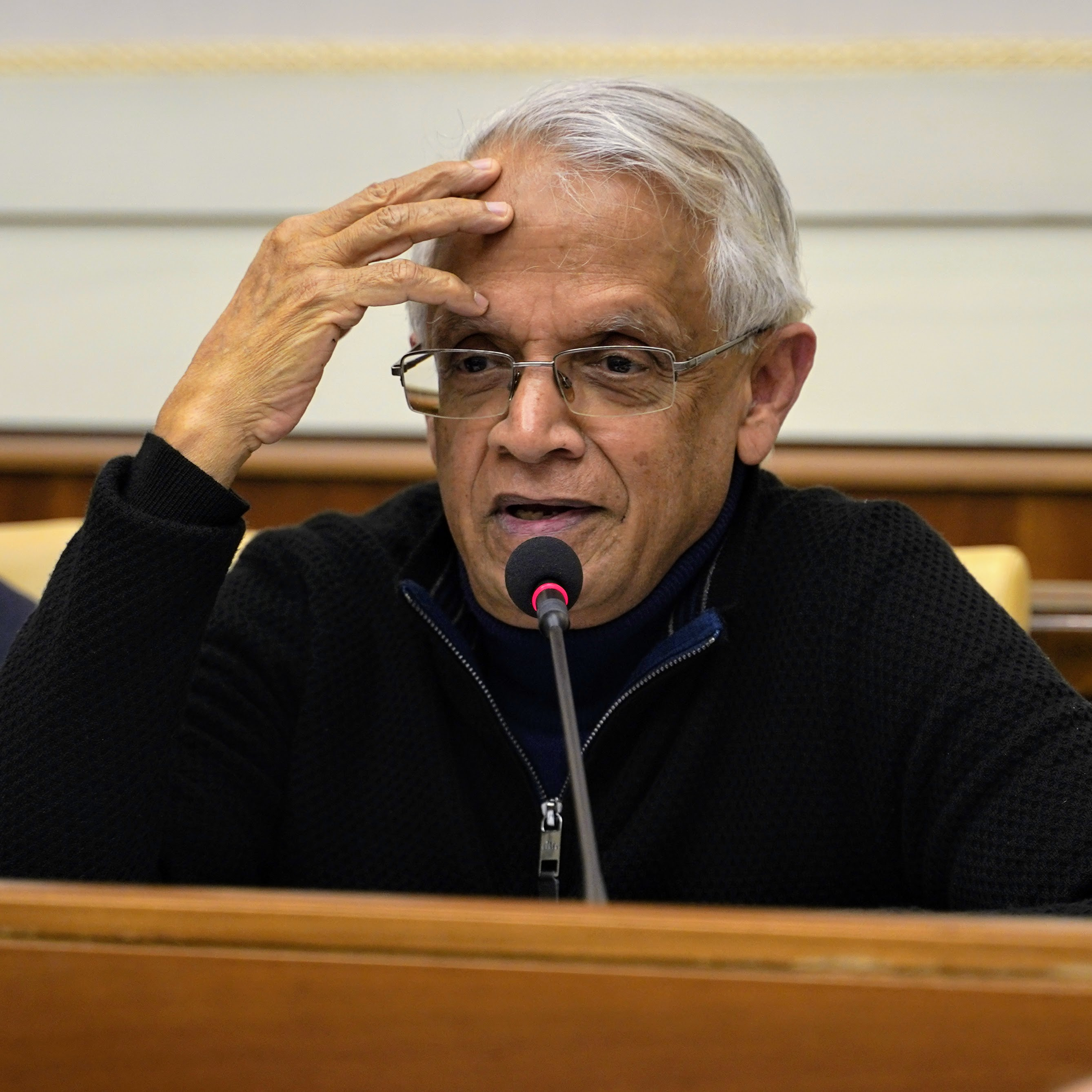
- Portrait of Veerabhadran Ramanathan
- Born: 24 November 1944 (age 81); Madurai, Madras Presidency, British India
- Education: Annamalai University; IISc; Stony Brook
- Awards: • Buys Ballot Medal • Carl-Gustaf Rossby Research Medal • Tyler Prize for Environmental Achievement • BBVA Foundation Frontiers of Knowledge Award • Tang Prize • Grande Médaille • Crafoord Prize
- Scientific career
- Fields: Atmospheric Scientist
- Workplaces: Scripps Institution of Oceanography
- Doctoral advisor: Robert Cess
- Website: ramanathan.ucsd.edu

Veerabhadran "Ram" Ramanathan (born 24 November 1944) holds the title of Professor Emeritus at the Scripps Institution of Oceanography, University of California, San Diego. He was Edward A. Frieman Endowed Presidential Chair in Climate Sustainability Scripps Institution of Oceanography, University of California, San Diego. He is also currently an adjunct professor in the Department of Global Development at Cornell University. He has contributed to many areas of the atmospheric and climate sciences including developments to general circulation models, atmospheric chemistry, and radiative transfer. He has been a part of major projects such as the Indian Ocean Experiment (INDOEX) and the Earth Radiation Budget Experiment (ERBE), and is known for his contributions to the areas of climate physics, Climate Change and atmospheric aerosols research. He is now the Chair of Bending the Curve: Climate Change Solutions education project of University of California. He has received numerous awards, and is a member of the US National Academy of Sciences. He has spoken about the topic of global warming, and written that "the effect of greenhouse gases on global warming is, in my opinion, the most important environmental issue facing the world today."

He is a member of the Pontifical Academy of Sciences, an organization established by the Vatican to promote scientific research and advise the Pope on scientific matters. He was appointed as an ordinary member on October 7, 2004, and serves on its council. In this capacity, he has personally advised Pope Francis on climate change issues. He was influential in the creation of Laudato si', the Pope's encyclical on climate change.

== Background and education ==
Ramanathan was born in Chennai, India. At the age of 11, he moved with his family to Bangalore. The classes at the school he attended were taught in English, and not his native Tamil. He admits that he "lost the habit of listening to my teachers and had to figure out things on my own". He received his BE degree from Annamalai University, and ME degree from the Indian Institute of Science. In 1970, he arrived in the US to study interferometry at the State University of New York at Stony Brook under the direction of Robert Cess. Before Ramanathan could begin working on his PhD research, Cess decided to change his research and focus on planetary atmospheres.

== Research and publications ==
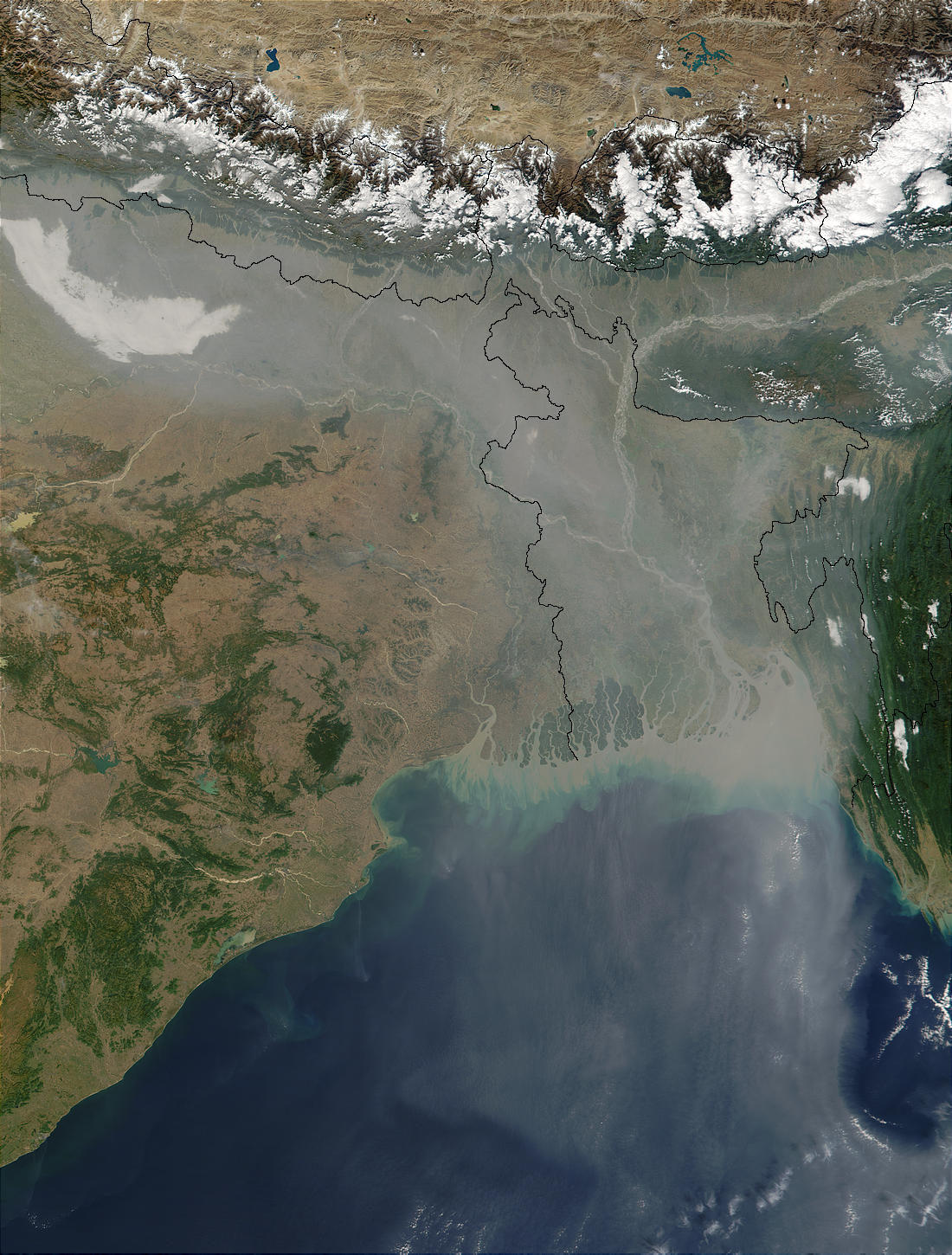
Atmospheric brown clouds in northeastern India and Bangladesh as seen from space

Ramanathan has contributed to many areas of the atmospheric sciences. His first major findings were in the mid-1970s and were related to the greenhouse effect of CFCs and other trace gases Until that time, carbon dioxide was thought to be the sole greenhouse gas responsible for global warming. He also contributed to the early development of global circulation models and the detecting and attribution of climate change.

His focus then shifted to the radiative effects of clouds on the climate. This was done using the Earth Radiation Budget Experiment (ERBE), which showed that clouds have a large cooling effect on the planet. ERBE was also able to measure the greenhouse effect without the use of climate models.

Recently, he has published on the aerosol radiative properties. His work has shown that aerosols have a cooling effect on the surface of the planet, and at the top of the atmosphere, but the forcing at the top of the atmosphere was only one-third the magnitude as the surface forcing. This has implications for the hydrologic cycle. While working on the Central Equatorial Pacific Experiment, he discovered that absorbing black carbonaceous aerosols have a larger influence on climate than previously thought, which led to the development of the Indian Ocean Experiment (INDOEX). In the 1990s, he led the Indian Ocean Experiment with Paul Crutzen and discovered the widespread existence of atmospheric brown clouds covering much of the Indian Ocean region. They found that the vast majority of the aerosols were anthropogenic in origin, and that the surface cooling caused by the aerosols is more important than the atmospheric heating. These atmospheric brown clouds may have masked as much as 50% of the surface heating caused by the increase in carbon dioxide, and caused reduced precipitation during the Indian monsoon.

Ramanathan is also interested in the impact of climate change on agriculture in India. While atmospheric brown clouds partially offset the warming due from carbon dioxide, their effect on agriculture has been less certain. A statistical rice model couple to a regional climate model has shown that reductions of both carbon dioxide and atmospheric brown clouds will increase crop yield.

He has also written on avoiding dangerous anthropogenic climate change. Ramanathan writes that there are several tipping points in the climate system, and that they do not all occur at the same temperature threshold; the tipping point for the arctic summer sea ice is likely to be smaller than that for the West Antarctic Ice Sheet. While the planet has seen an observed warming of 0.6 °C since pre-industrial times, it has already most likely committed itself to 2.4 °C (1.4 °C to 4.3 °C) of warming. These values surpass several of the tipping point thresholds. In a 2014 paper, Ramanathan and co-authors suggested that mitigating methane, soot, ozone and hydrofluorocarbons in the atmosphere could reduce the expected sea level rise due to climate change.

== Project Surya ==
In March 2007, Ramanathan wrote a white paper with Balakrishnan on a potential project that will reduce air pollution and global warming. Project Surya, which means Sun in Sanskrit, will use inexpensive solar cookers in rural India, and document the reductions in carbon dioxide and soot emissions. The byproducts of biofuel cooking and biomass burning are significant contributors to global warming, and the expanded use of renewable energy is expected to decrease their effects.

The burning of solid fuels causes substantial health risks as well. An estimated 440,000 deaths per year are attributed to unsanitary food preparation techniques due to aerosol exposure. Over 3 billion people cook and heat their home by burning biomass such as wood and feces. The project, costing an estimated $4.5 million, will buy 3,500 cookers and impact up to 15,000 people. As of November 2008, the project has not been funded.

Project Surya was soft launched in March 2009. Each household in the village of Khairatpur, Uttar Pradesh received a biomass cook stove and a solar lamp. Surya has since received $150,000 in funding from UNEP.

== Honors and awards ==
Ramanathan is an ISI highly cited researcher. He is a fellow of the American Association for the Advancement of Science, American Meteorological Society and American Geophysical Union. He became a member of the American Academy of Arts and Sciences in 1995. In 1995, the Royal Netherlands Academy of Arts and Sciences awarded him the Buys Ballot Medal. In 2002, he was awarded the Carl-Gustaf Rossby Research Medal, "... for fundamental insights into the radiative roles of clouds, aerosols and key gases in the Earth's climate system." He was elected a member of the US National Academy of Sciences in 2002 "... for fundamental contributions to our modern understanding of global climate change and human impacts on climate and environment", an Academician of the Pontifical Academy of Sciences in 2004, a member the American Philosophical Society in 2006, and a member of the Royal Swedish Academy of Sciences in 2008. Also, Veerabhadran Ramanathan has been bestowed with the BBVA Foundation Frontiers of Knowledge Award 2015 in the Climate Change category for discovering that human-produced gases and pollutants other than CO_{2} have a huge power to alter the Earth's climate, and that by acting on them it is possible to make a short-term dent on the rate of global warming. He received the prestigious Tang Prize for Sustainable Development in 2018. He was awarded the 90th annual Mendel Medal by Villanova University in 2018 for his work on climate change. Ramanathan is the recipient of the Lifetime Achievement Award (Champions of the Earth) in 2013. For 2024 he was awarded the Grande Médaille of the Académie des sciences (France) and for 2026 the Crafoord Prize in Geosciences.

== Articles ==
- Why Black Carbon and Ozone Also Matter, in September/October 2009 Foreign Affairs with Veerabhadran Ramanathan and Jessica Seddon Wallack.
- The Climate Threat We Can Beat, in May/June 2012 Foreign Affairs with David G. Victor, Charles F. Kennel, Veerabhadran Ramanathan (website is paid while article is current)
