= Chemical equator =

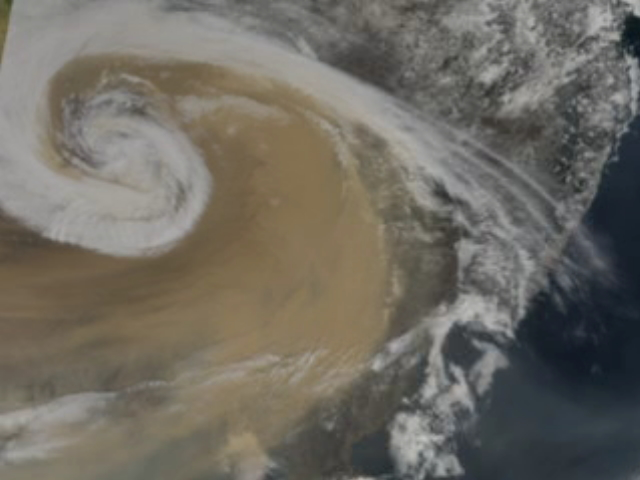
NASA imaging of a pollution filled "brown storm cloud" over Southeast Asia.

The chemical equator term and concept was coined in 2008 when researchers from University of York discovered a distinct divide between the polluted air and haze over Indonesia from the largely uncontaminated atmosphere over Australia. This divide is distinguishable by a rapid increase in atmospheric levels of carbon monoxide and other pollutants from the Tropical Warm Pool region northward. The divide of the atmosphere of the Northern Hemisphere from the atmosphere of the Southern Hemisphere is different from that of the Intertropical Convergence Zone.

== Discovery ==
Scientists at the University of York's Department of Chemistry conducted the first research that supported the concept of a 50 km wide chemical equator by comparing concentrations of atmospheric pollutants in both sides. They observed that the atmospheric boundary, where drastic and quick changes in pollutants occurred, was well north of the Intertropical Convergence Zone, which was previously thought to be the only chemical atmospheric boundary. This discovery is also the first observance of meteorological and chemical boundaries between air masses not being the same, though correlated.

== Causes ==
Biomass burning within this region, particularly from Southeast Asia, is responsible for the polluted air which is uplifted by convection and dispersed into the atmosphere over the Western Pacific. This convection is in contrast to the clean ocean air that is advected by cyclones over Northern Australia. Greenhouse gases are produced at high rates in Southeast Asia due to the less developed burning conditions, large population, and fast population growth. The soluble pollutants are mostly removed during the summer by monsoons and winds but during winter these pollutants are more present in the atmosphere, making the divide more definite.

Storm systems in the Tropical Warm Pool may also increase the influence of the atmospheric pollutants by acting as a pump that lifts polluted air higher up in the atmosphere where it will remain suspended for a longer period of time, as well as helping to spread it.

== See also ==
- Asian brown cloud
- Intertropical Convergence Zone
- Tropical Warm Pool
- Southeast Asian Haze
- Greenhouse gas emissions
