= Grande Médaille =

The Grande Médaille of the French Academy of Sciences, established in 1997, is awarded annually to a researcher who has contributed decisively to the development of science. It is the most prestigious of the Academy's awards, and is awarded in a different field each year. Its creation results from the combination of the original French Academy of Sciences Lalande Prize of 1802 with the Benjamin Valz Foundation Prize in 1970 and then with another 122 foundation prizes in 1997.

== Winners ==
- 2024 - Veerabhadran Ramanathan, climatologist
- 2023 - Michael N. Hall, molecular biologist
- 2022 - Terence Tao, mathematics
- 2021 - Katalin Karikó, biochemistry
- 2018 - Jocelyn Bell Burnell, astrophysics
- 2016 - Alexander Varshavsky, biochemistry
- 2015 - no award
- 2014 - Joel Lebowitz, physics and mathematics
- 2013 - Joan A. Steitz, biochemistry
- 2012 - Adi Shamir, cryptography
- 2011 - Avelino Corma Canos, chemistry
- 2010 - Michael Atiyah, mathematics
- 2009 - Robert Weinberg, cancer research
- 2008 - Susan Solomon, atmospheric chemistry
- 2007 - Tomas Hökfelt, who studied neurotransmitters, and discovered their role in depression
- 2006 - Peter Goldreich, theoretical astrophysicist and planetary scientist
- 2005 - Ronald M. Evans, studied hormone receptors and the control of gene expression
- 2004 - David Gross, one of the founders of quantum chromodynamics and the Standard Model
- 2003 - David D. Sabatini, early inventor of electron microscopy techniques for cellular biology, discoverer of signalling peptides
- 2002 - Richard Garwin, discovered parity violation in pion decay
- 2001 - Albert Eschenmoser, organic chemistry
- 2000 - Robert Langlands, mathematics
- 1999 - Rene Thomas, molecular biology
- 1998 - Leo Kadanoff, physics
- 1997 - Jozef Schell, molecular biology of plants

== See also ==
- List of general science and technology awards
