= Indian Ocean Experiment =

1999 South East Asian air pollution study

The Indian Ocean Experiment (INDOEX) was a 1999 multinational scientific study designed to measure the transport of air pollution from Southeast Asia into the Indian Ocean. The project was led by Veerabhadran Ramanathan.

== Findings ==
- Plumes of sulfates, smoke particles, and other anthropogenic aerosols blowing over the Indian Ocean were blocking sunlight and promoting cloud formation.
- The amount of sunlight reaching the Earth's surface was reduced by 10%.

== See also ==
- Asian brown cloud
- Veerabhadran Ramanathan
