= Geography of South India =

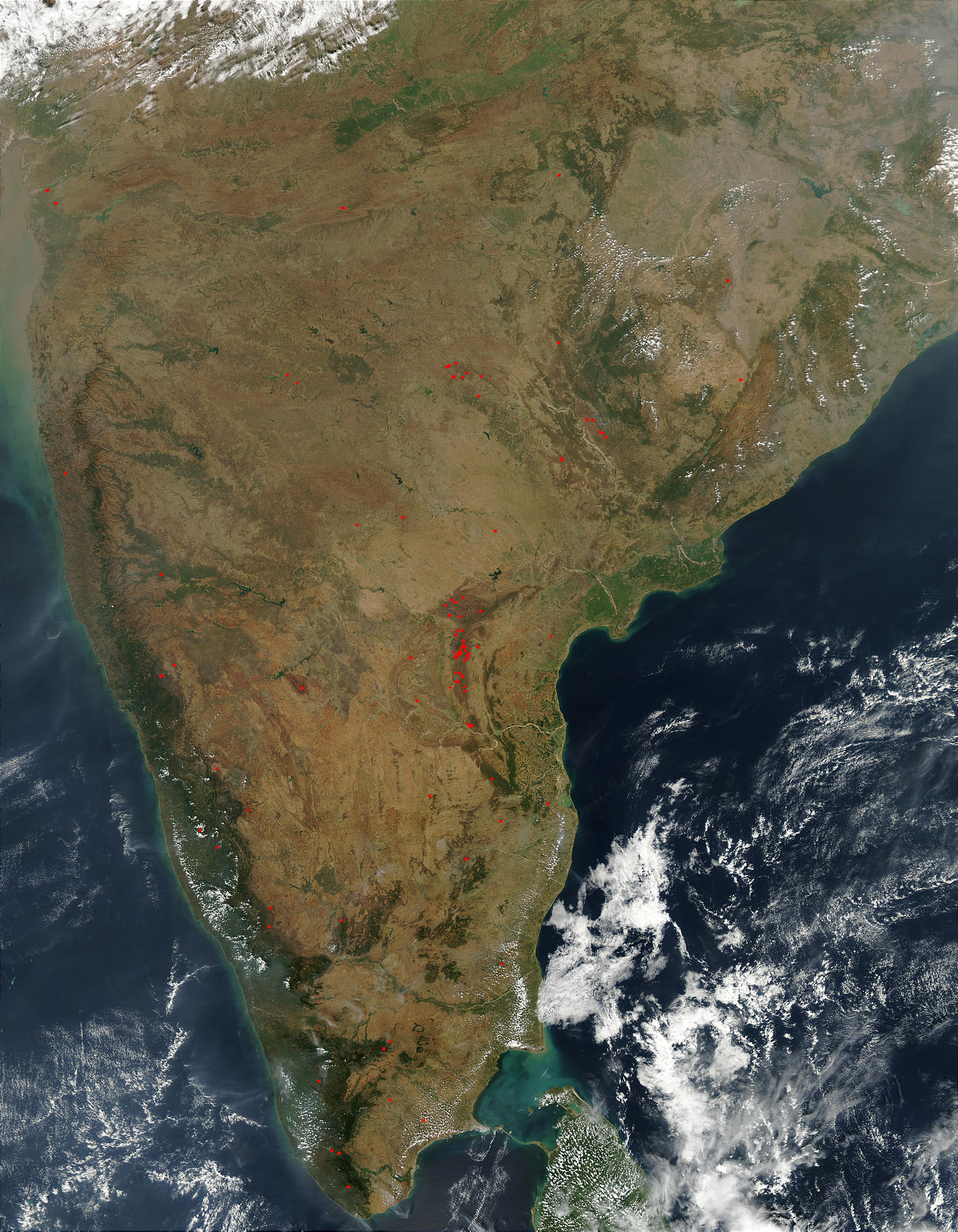
Southern India photo from space (NASA) Numerous scattered fires (red dots) were detected by the Moderate Resolution Imaging Spectroradiometer (MODIS) on the Aqua satellite across southern India on January 31, 2003. Fire are especially concentrated in the Nallamala Hills region of the Eastern Ghats along India’s Indian Ocean coast (right). Fires also drape down the Western Ghat Mountains on India’s Arabian Sea coast (left).

The Geography of South India comprises the diverse topological and climatic patterns of South India. South India is a peninsula in the shape of a vast inverted triangle, bounded on the west by the Arabian Sea, on the east by the Bay of Bengal and on the north by the Vindhya and Satpura ranges.

The Satpura ranges define the northern spur of the Deccan Plateau, one of the main geographic features of South India. The Western Ghats, along the western coast, mark another boundary of the plateau. The narrow strip of verdant land between the Western Ghats and the Arabian Sea is the Konkan region; the term encompasses the area south of the Narmada as far as Coastal Karnataka.

The Western Ghats continue south, forming the Malnad (Canara) region along the Karnataka coast, and terminate at the Nilgiri Mountains, an inward (easterly) extension of the Western Ghats. The Nilgiris run in a crescent approximately along the borders of Tamil Nadu with northern Kerala and Karnataka, encompassing the Palakkad and Wayanad hills, and the Satyamangalam ranges, and extending on to the relatively low-lying hills of the Eastern Ghats, on the western portion of the Tamil Nadu–Andhra Pradesh border. The Tirupati and Anaimalai hills form part of this range.

The Deccan Plateau, covering the major portion of the states of Maharashtra, Karnataka and Tamil Nadu, is the vast elevated region bound by the C-shape defined by all these mountain ranges. No major elevations border the plateau to the east, and it slopes gently from the Western Ghats to the eastern coast.

== Geological development ==
India is entirely contained on the Indian Plate, a major tectonic plate that was formed when it split off from the left over land of the ancient continent Gondwanaland. About 91 million years ago, during the late Cretaceous Period, the Indian Plate began moving north at about 15 cm/yr (6 in/yr).

The vast volcanic basalt beds of the Deccan were laid down in the massive Deccan Traps eruption, which occurred towards the end of the Cretaceous period, between 67 and 66 million years ago. Some paleontologists speculate that this eruption may have accelerated the extinction of the non-avian dinosaurs. Layer after layer was formed by the volcanic activity that lasted many thousands of years, and when the volcanoes became extinct, they left a region of highlands with typically vast stretches of flat areas on top like a table. Hence it is also known as Table Top. The volcanic hotspot that produced the Deccan traps is hypothesized to lie under the present day island of Réunion in the Indian Ocean.

== Climate ==
The region has a tropical climate with the monsoons playing the major part. The southwest monsoon accounts for most of the rainfall in the region and much of it occurs from about June to September. Tamil Nadu and southeast Andhra Pradesh receive rains from the northeast monsoon from about October to January. Much of Andhra Pradesh and Karnataka has a distinct dry season from November until May when there is not much rainfall. This region also experiences cooler nights from October to March while the days are pleasantly warm. In the northern parts of the region temperatures can fall below 10 °C or 50 °F on occasions at night. Days are very hot from March to June when temperatures can surpass 40 °C or 104 °F.

== States and Union Territories ==
South India includes five states – Andhra Pradesh, Karnataka, Kerala, Tamil Nadu, and Telangana – where the official and majority languages are Dravidian languages. State boundaries generally follow linguistic lines.

The northern portion of the Western Ghats and Deccan Plateau are in the states of Goa and Maharashtra, although these states are often classed in Western India. The official and majority languages in Goa and Maharashtra are Indo-European languages.

South India also has two Union territories, Puducherry and Lakshadweep.

== Regions ==
South India has a number of overlapping traditional geographic regions. Some of these regions are:

- Bayaluseemae- The plain area of Deccan Plateau in Karnataka
- Carnatic – etymologically related to the Deccan, refers to all of South India
- Canara or Karaavali – the Karnataka coast
- Chera Nadu – Western Tamil Nadu and most of modern Kerala
- Chettinadu – Southern Tamil Nadu surrounding Sivagangai
- Chola Nadu – Central Tamil Nadu surrounding Thanjavur.
- Cochin - The region of Kerala which lies between the rivers Bharathappuzha and Periyar, sometimes extended to Pamba.
- Coromandel Coast – south coastal Andhra Pradesh, North coastal Tamil Nadu and the Puducherry Union Territory
- Deccan – plateau region covering interior Maharashtra, Andhra Pradesh and Karnataka. Includes the Marathwada, Vidarbha, Telangana, Rayalaseema, North Karnataka and Mysore regions.
- Kammanadu – Region south of Krishna River up to Nellore in
- Konaseema – Coastal region between the tributaries of the Godavari River in the East Godavari District of Andhra Pradesh
- Kongu Nadu – Western Tamil Nadu surrounding Coimbatore
- Konkan – coastal region comprising coastal Maharashtra, Goa and part of coastal Karnataka
- Kosta – Coastal districts of Andhra Pradesh
- Malabar region – Northern Kerala
- Malenadu – Sahyadri hills between the coast and the plateau in Karnataka
- Mulakanadu – Region to the north of the Godavari River
- Mysore – South Karnataka around Mysore
- North Karnataka – North Karnataka around Dharawad
- North Malabar - The northern most region in Kerala which lies between Mangalore and Kozhikode. It was the former seat of Ezhimala kingdom, Mushika dynasty and Kolathunadu.
- Northern Circars – Muslim administrative units in Madras state in British India, namely Chicacole, Rajahmundry, Ellore, Kondapalli and Guntur
- Palnadu – Northern Tamil Nadu and Southern districts of Andhra Pradesh
- Pandya Nadu – Southern Tamil Nadu around Madurai
- Raichur Doab – mostly northern Karnataka, between the Krishna and Tungabhadra rivers
- Rayalaseema – Southern parts Andhra Pradesh consisting of Kurnool, Kadapa, Anantapuram and Chittoor districts.
- South Malabar - The north-central region of Kerala, which lies between the rivers Korapuzha and Bharathappu.
- Tondai Nadu – Northern Tamil Nadu around Kanchipuram
- Thiruvithaamkoor or Travancore – Southern Kerala and Kanniyakumari District of Tamil Nadu
- Tulu Nadu – Coastal districts of Udupi and South Canara in Karnataka
- Velanadu – Places on the banks of Krishna River from Guntur to Srisailam in Andhra Pradesh
- Uttarandhra – Northern parts of Andhra Pradesh comprising three districts (Srikakulam, Vizianagaram and Visakhapatnam)

The low-lying coral islands of Lakshadweep are off the south-western coast of India. Sri Lanka lies off the south-eastern coast, separated from India by the Palk Strait and the chain of low sandbars and islands known as Rama's Bridge. The Andaman and Nicobar islands lie far off the eastern coast of India, near the Tenasserim coast of Burma. The southernmost tip of mainland India is at Kanyakumari (Cape Comorin) on the Indian Ocean.

== Water bodies ==
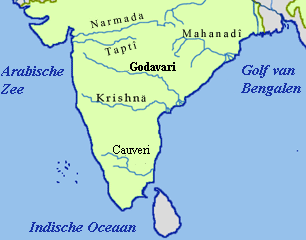
The rivers of Southern India

Rivers of South India are dependent on the monsoons and shrink during the dry season. The line created by the Narmada River and Mahanadi River is the traditional boundary between northern and southern India. The Narmada flows westwards in the depression between the Vindhya and Satpura ranges. The plateau is watered by the east flowing Godavari and Krishna rivers. The other major rivers of the Deccan Plateau are the Pennar and the Tungabhadra, a major tributary of the Krishna.

The river Kaveri rises in the Western Ghats, in the Kodagu district of Karnataka and flows through the fertile Mandya, Mysore, Hassan regions before entering Tamil Nadu, where it forms an extensive and fertile delta on the east coast. The three major river deltas of South India, the Kaveri, the Godavari and the Krishna, are located along the Bay of Bengal. These areas constitute the rice bowls of South India. Rivers that flow westward, from the mountains to the Arabian Sea, include the Periyar River, Netravati River, Mandovi and Tapti River (or Tapi) rivers, and the Narmada at the northern edge of the region.

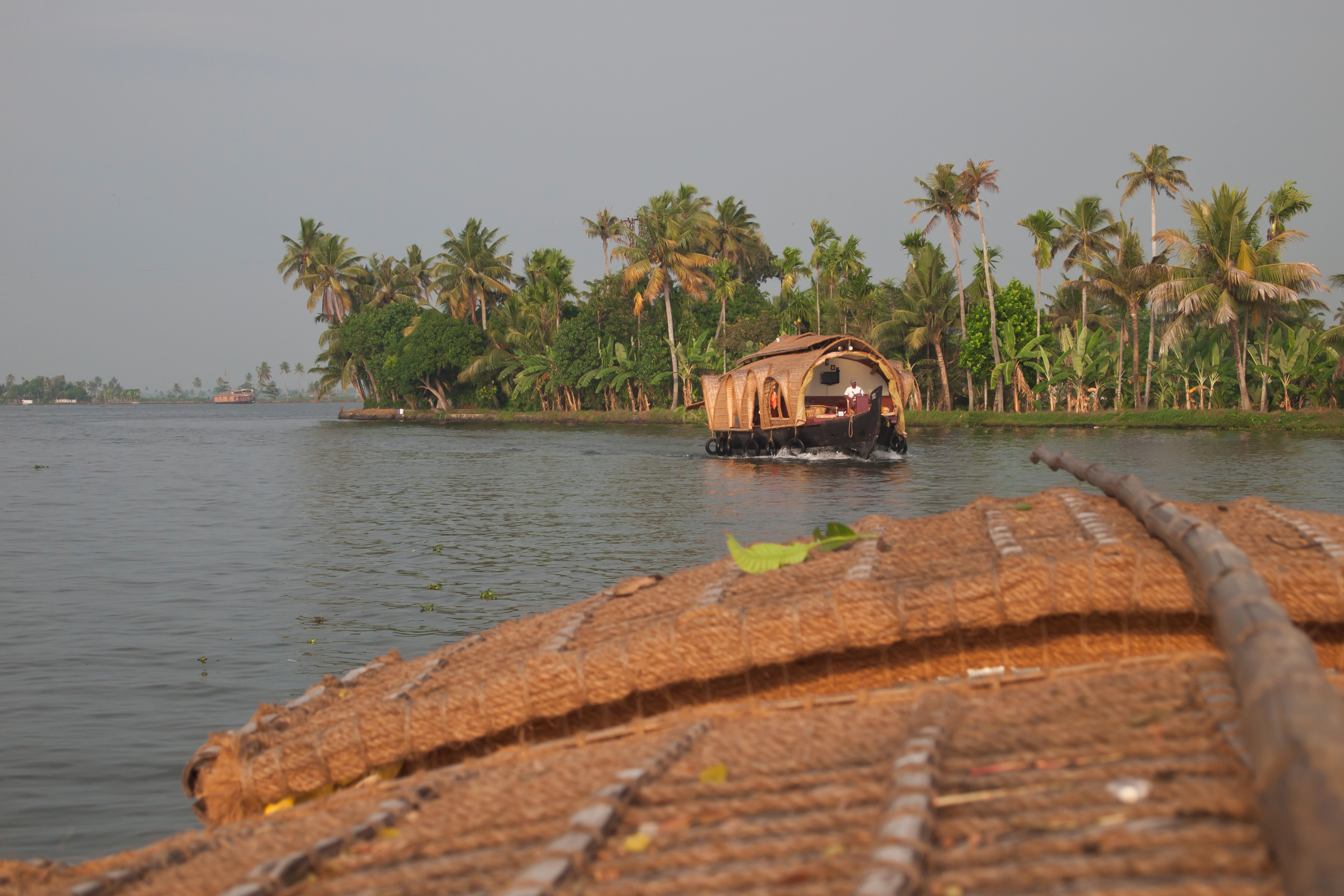
India's largest lake at Vembanad, is a part of the larger Kerala backwaters

Kerala's western coastal belt is relatively flat compared to the eastern sloped region bounded by Western Ghats, and is criss-crossed by a network of interconnected brackish canals, lakes, estuaries, and rivers known as the Kerala Backwaters. Geographically, the Malabar coast comprises the wettest regions of southern India, as the Western Ghats intercept the moisture-laden monsoon rains, especially on their westward-facing mountain slopes.

Kuttanad, also known as The Rice Bowl of Kerala, has the lowest altitude in India, and is also one of the few places in world where cultivation takes place below sea level. The country's longest lake Vembanad, dominates the backwaters; it lies between Alappuzha and Kochi and is about 200 km^{2} (77 sq mi) in area. Around eight percent of India's waterways are found in Kerala. Kerala's 44 rivers include the Periyar; 244 kilometres (152 mi), Bharathapuzha; 209 kilometres (130 mi), Pamba; 176 kilometres (109 mi), Chaliyar; 169 kilometres (105 mi), Kadalundipuzha; 130 kilometres (81 mi), Chalakudipuzha; 130 kilometres (81 mi), Valapattanam; 129 kilometres (80 mi) and the Achankovil River; 128 kilometres (80 mi). The average length of the rivers is 64 kilometres (40 mi). Many of the rivers are small and entirely fed by monsoon rain.

== Flora and fauna ==
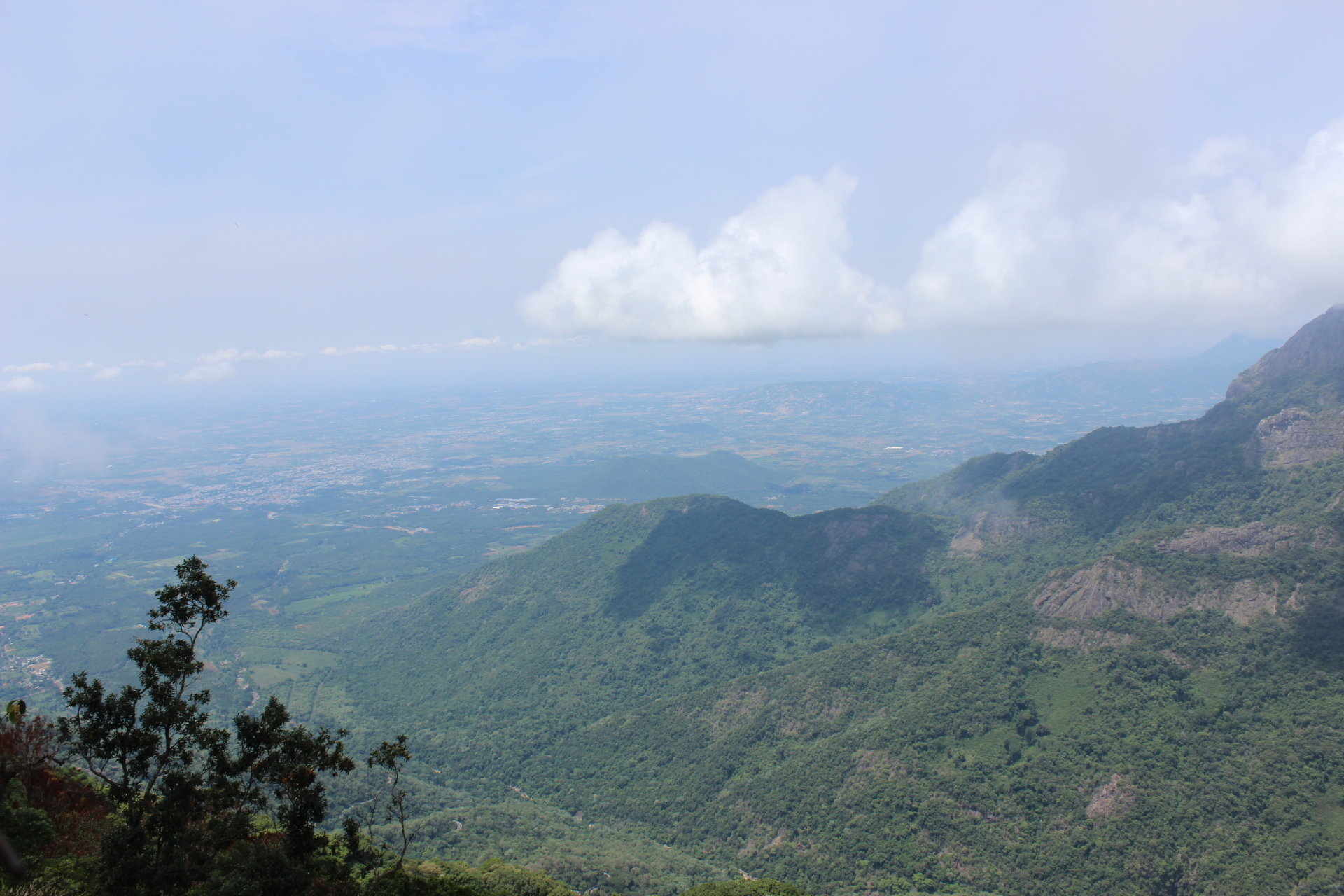
The Nilgiri Biosphere Reserve lies amid the Nilgiris range of Western Ghats, which is scattered in the states of Karnataka, Kerala, and Tamil Nadu

There is a large number and wide diversity of plants and animals in South India, resulting from its varied climates and geography. Tropical moist forests are found along the Arabian Sea coast and the Western Ghats. The Malabar Coast moist forests are found on the coastal plains. The South Western Ghats moist deciduous forests are found at intermediate elevations. The southern Western Ghats have high altitude rain forests called the South Western Ghats montane rain forests. The Western Ghats are a biodiversity hotspot.

Scrub lands, including the Deccan thorn scrub forests, are common in the interior Deccan Plateau. Some of India's famous protected areas are found in South India. These include Project Tiger reserves Periyar National Park, Kalakad – Mundanthurai and Nagarjunsagar-Srisailam Tiger Reserve. Important ecological regions of South India are the Nilgiri Biosphere Reserve, located at the conjunction of the borders of Karnataka, Kerala and Tamil Nadu in the Nilgiri Hills including Mudumalai National Park, Bandipur National Park, Nagarhole National Park Silent Valley National Park, Wayanad Wildlife Sanctuary and Sathyamangalam Wildlife Sanctuary and the Anamalai Hills including the Eravikulam National Park, Chinnar Wildlife Sanctuary, Parambikulam Wildlife Sanctuary and the adjacent The Indira Gandhi Wildlife Sanctuary and National Park of the Western Ghats. Important bird sanctuaries including Ranganathittu Bird Sanctuary, Kumarakom Bird Sanctuary, Nelapattu and Pulicat Sanctuary are home to numerous migratory and local birds. Other protected ecological sites include the backwaters like the Pulicat Lake in Andhra Pradesh, Pitchavaram in Tamil Nadu and the famed backwaters of Kerala formed by the Vembanad Lake, the Ashtamudi Lake and the Kayamkulam Lake.
