= Robert D. Cess =

American academic (1933–2022)

Robert Donald Cess (March 3, 1933 – March 22, 2022) was a professor of atmospheric sciences at Stony Brook University. He was born in Portland, Oregon. Cess earned his bachelor of science degree in mechanical engineering from Oregon State University and his master's degree from Purdue University in Indiana in 1956. He received a Ph.D. from the University of Pittsburgh in 1959. He is a recognized leader in the fields of climate change and atmospheric radiation transfer. His research interests involved modeling of climate feedbacks that can either amplify or diminish global climate change, and interpreting surface and satellite remote sensing data.

He was a part of studies which have found problems with the ability of model the transmission of shortwave radiation through a cloud-free atmosphere, and designed an experiment to test the accuracy of the models. They reported that they found agreement between the models and the observations of clear-sky shortwave radiation at the surface for the period studied, 1985 to 1988. Cess was a lead author of the Intergovernmental Panel on Climate Change and worked with the National Science Foundation on understanding greenhouse warming and its associated policy implications. He died on March 22, 2022, at his home in Connecticut.

== Awards ==
Cess won numerous awards, including NASA's highest scientific honor, the NASA Exceptional Scientific Achievement Medal, in 1989. In 2006, he received the Jule G. Charney Award, which is awarded to scientists in recognition of significant research in the atmospheric or hydrologic sciences, from the American Meteorological Society "for his outstanding contributions to our understanding of the science of atmospheric radiation and climate change and the role of clouds in climate models".

== Selected publications ==
- Cess, R. D. & P. M. Udelhofen (2003). "Climate change during 1985-1999: Cloud interactions determined from satellite measurements". Geophysical Research Letters. 30 (1): 1019. Bibcode:2003GeoRL..30.1019C. doi:10.1029/2002GL016128. S2CID 129757095.
- Cess, R. D.; M. Zhang; B. A. Wielicki; D. F. Young; X-L. Zhou; Y. Nikitenko (2001). "The Influence of the 1998 El Niño upon Cloud-Radiative Forcing over the Pacific Warm Pool". J. Climate. 14 (9): 2129–2137. Bibcode:2001JCli...14.2129C. doi:10.1175/1520-0442(2001)014<2129:TIOTEN>2.0.CO;2.
- Cess, R. D.; Qian, T.; Sun, M. (2000). "Consistency tests applied to the measurement of total, direct and diffuse shortwave radiation at the surface". J. Geophys. Res. 105 (D20): 24881–24887. Bibcode:2000JGR...10524881C. doi:10.1029/2000JD900402.
- Cess, R. D.; et al. (1999). "Absorption of solar radiation by the cloudy atmosphere: Further interpretations of collocated aircraft measurements". J. Geophys. Res. 104 (D2): 2059–2066. Bibcode:1999JGR...104.2059C. doi:10.1029/1998JD200058. S2CID 19031313.
- Cess, R. D.; Zhang, M. H.; Potter, G. L.; Alekseev, V.; Barker, H. W.; Bony, S.; Colman, R. A.; Dazlich, D. A.; et al. (1997). "Comparison of the seasonal change in cloud-radiative forcing from atmospheric general circulation models and satellite observations". J. Geophys. Res. 102 (D14): 16593–16603. Bibcode:1997JGR...10216593C. doi:10.1029/97JD00927. hdl:11858/00-001M-0000-0014-9F60-1.
- Cess, R. D.; et al. (1995). "Absorption of Solar Radiation by Clouds: Observations Versus Models". Science. 267 (5197): 496–499. Bibcode:1995Sci...267..496C. doi:10.1126/science.267.5197.496. PMID 17788783. S2CID 25821914.
- Zhang, M. H.; J. J. Hack; J. T. Kiehl; R. D. Cess (1994). "Diagnostic Study of Climate Feedback Processes in Atmospheric General Circulation Models". J. Geophys. Res. 99 (D3): 5525–5537. Bibcode:1994JGR....99.5525Z. doi:10.1029/93JD03523.
