= Mysore (region) =

Coordinates: 13°30′N 76°00′E

The Mysore region is a region that is part of Karnataka state in southern India. It forms approximately the southern half of the non-coastal areas of that state. The area corresponds almost exactly to that of the erstwhile princely state of Mysore. Almost all of that principality, with the exception of a few areas that now lie in neighbouring states, is comprehended by this term.

The region lies on the Deccan plateau, east of the hilly Malenadu region, which includes the eastern foothills of the Western Ghats range. It consists of gently rolling plains, punctuated by several of the large rivers that rise in the Western Ghats and flow eastward to empty into the Bay of Bengal.

Mysore region, also known as the Southern Karnataka Plateau, is made up of the low rolling granite hills from 600 to 900 meters elevation. It is bounded on the west by the Western Ghats and on the south and east by ranges of hills or Eastern Ghats, and on the north it drops to the lower-elevation northern Maidan. It includes Bangalore, Bangalore Rural, Chamrajnagar, Hassan, Chikmagalur, Kolar, Chikkaballapura, Mandya, Mysore, Ramanagara, Shimoga, Chitradurga, Davangere and Tumkur districts. Most of the region is covered by the South Deccan Plateau dry deciduous forests ecoregion, which extends south into eastern Tamil Nadu.

Some of the larger cities and towns of the Maidan include Bangalore, Mysore, Tumkur, Chitradurga and Davangere. Agriculture and animal husbandry are the mainstays of the region, and the main crops include cotton, sorghum, millet, and peanuts.

The region lies in the rain shadow of the Western Ghats and is generally much drier than coastal Karnataka and the Western Ghats. It was originally covered by extensive, open-canopied Tropical dry deciduous forests, characterized by the trees Acacia, Albizia and Hardwickia, but much of the original forest has been cleared for agriculture, timber, grazing and firewood. Overexploitation of the forests for fuelwood and fodder has resulted in much of the original forest being degraded into thickets and scrublands. Canthium parriflorum, Cassia auriculata, Dodonaea viscosa, Erythroxylum monogynum, Pterolobium hexapetalum and Euphorbia antiquorum are species typical of the thicket and scrubland vegetation.
