= Bruce T. Draine =

American astrophysicist

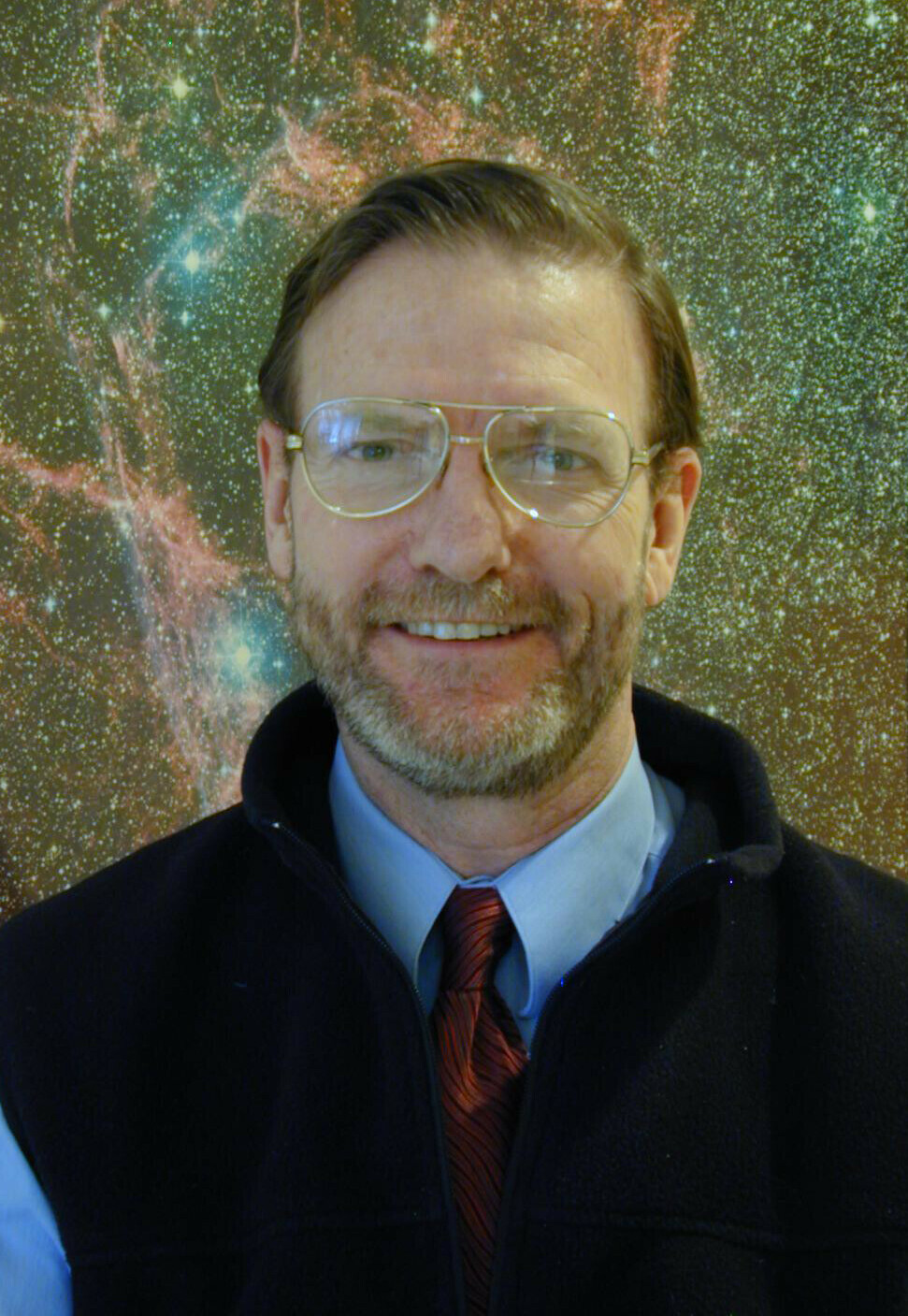
- Draine in 2005
- Born: Bruce Thomas Draine; November 19, 1947 (age 78); Kolkata, India
- Education: Swarthmore College (BA); Cornell University (MS, PhD)
- Awards: Dannie Heineman Prize for Astrophysics (2004)
- Scientific career
- Fields: Astrophysics
- Workplaces: Institute for Advanced Study; Princeton University
- Thesis: Topics in the physics of interstellar grains (1978)
- Doctoral advisor: Edwin E. Salpeter
- Website: www.astro.princeton.edu/~draine/

Bruce Thomas Draine (born November 19, 1947, in Kolkata) is an American astrophysicist. He is Professor of Astrophysical Sciences at Princeton University.

He attended Swarthmore College from 1965 to 1969. He served in the U.S. Peace Corps in Ghana from 1969 to 1971, where he taught secondary school physics and mathematics. He received his Ph.D. from Cornell University in 1978. From 1979 to 1982 he was in the School of Natural Sciences at the Institute for Advanced Study. He is currently an emeritus professor in the Department of Astrophysical Sciences at Princeton University. His research involves the study of the interstellar medium, especially interstellar dust, photodissociation regions, and interstellar shock waves.

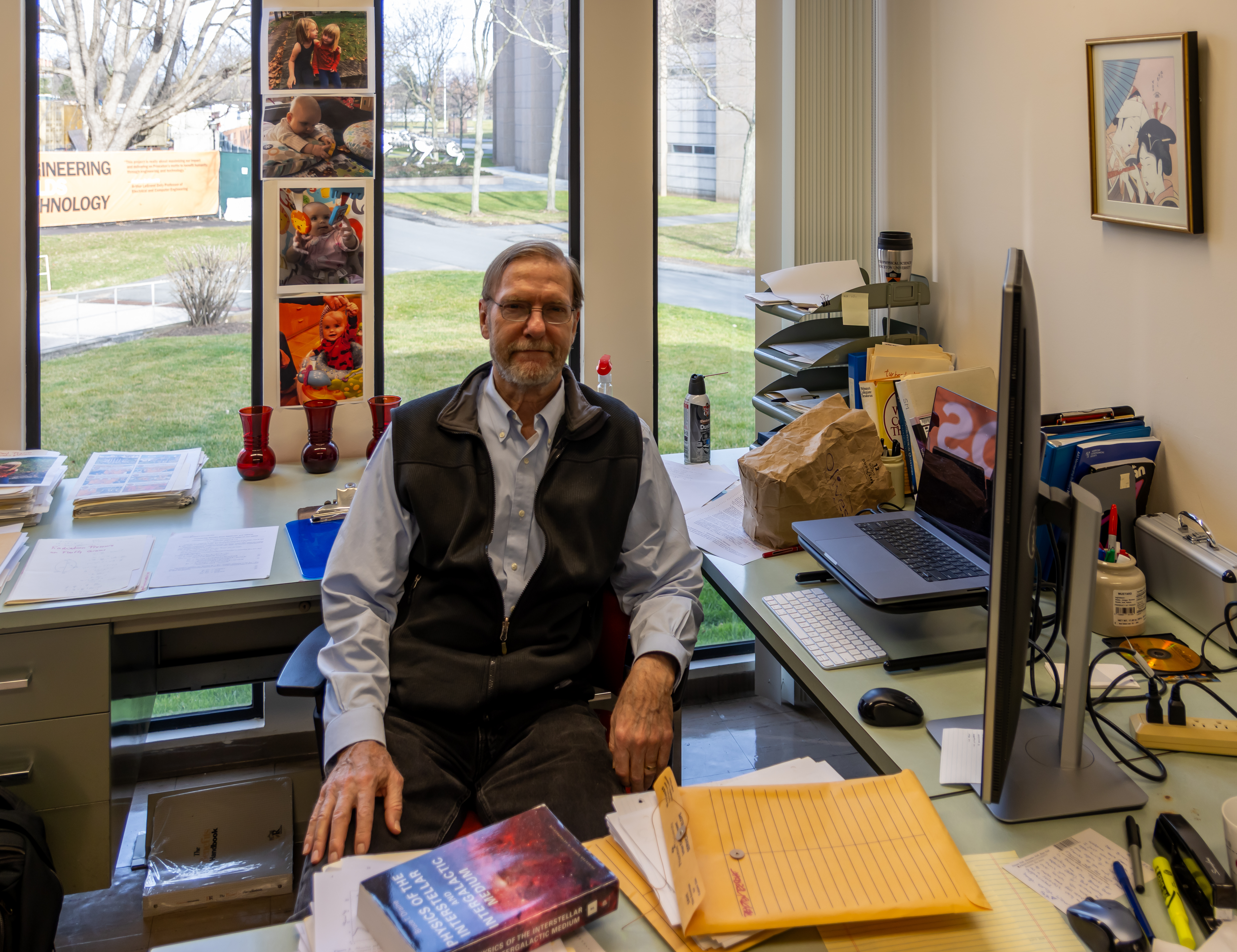
Draine at his desk in 2024

He is one of the authors (together with Piotr J. Flatau) of the public domain DDSCAT code based on the discrete dipole approximation which has application to light scattering by non-spherical particles and nanophotonics.

== Honors and awards ==
In 2004 he won the Dannie Heineman Prize for Astrophysics for his "fundamental, pioneering studies of interstellar processes". In 2007, he was inducted into the National Academy of Sciences for his work in the field of Astrophysics. He was elected a Legacy Fellow of the American Astronomical Society in 2020.

== Books ==
- Draine, Bruce T. (2011). Physics of the Interstellar and Intergalactic Medium. Princeton University Press. ISBN 978-0-691-12213-7.
- Blain, A.; Combes, F.; Draine, B (2004). Pfenniger, D.; Revaz, Y (eds.). The Cold Universe. Berlin: Springer. ISBN 3-540-40838-X.
