= Asian brown cloud =

Recurrent layer of air pollution covering South Asia

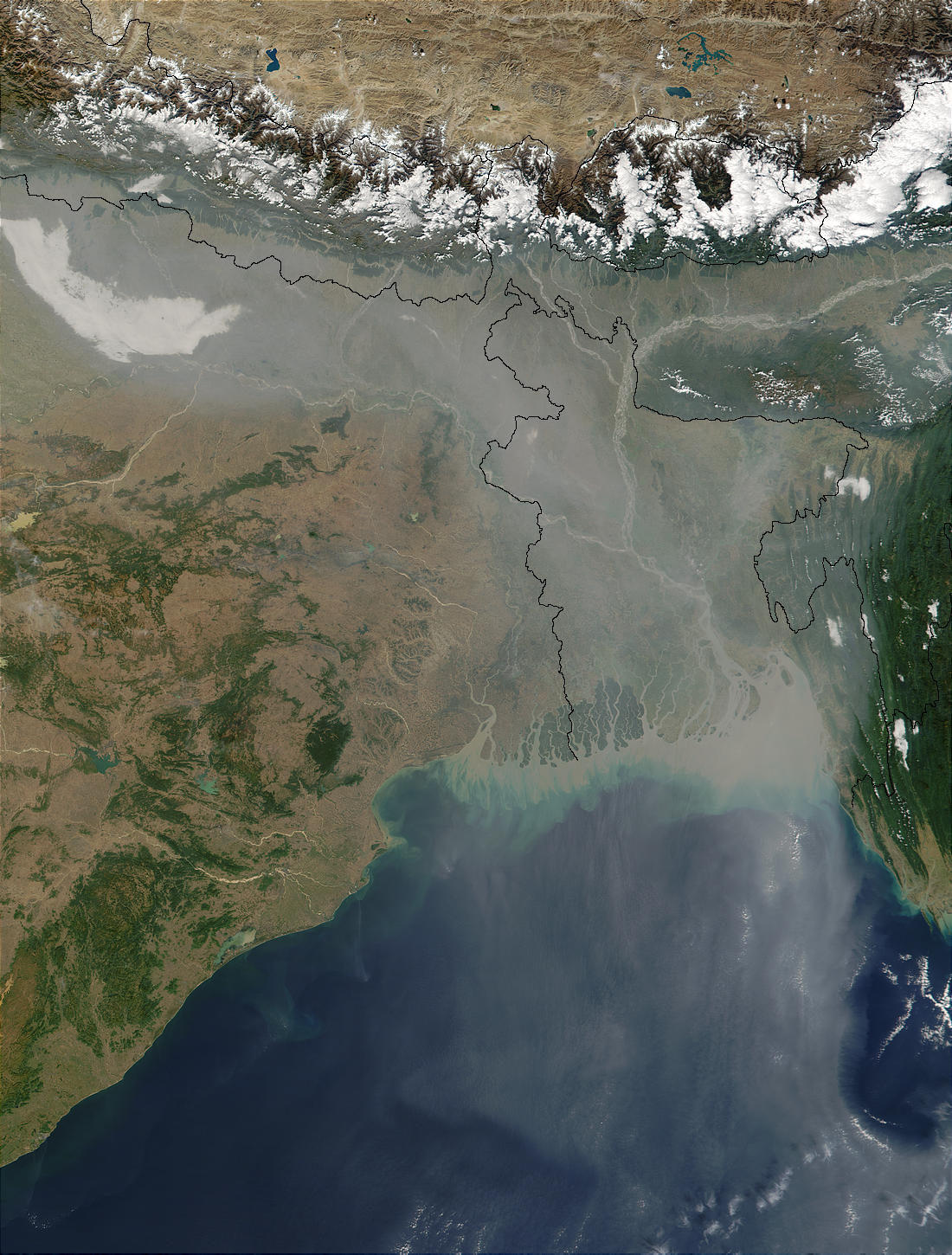
Aerosol pollution over north India and Bangladesh, as seen on satellite imagery

The Indian Ocean brown cloud or Asian brown cloud is a layer of air pollution that recurrently covers parts of South Asia, namely the northern Indian Ocean, India, and Pakistan. Viewed from satellite photos, the cloud appears as a giant brown stain hanging in the air over much of the Indian subcontinent and the Indian Ocean every year between October and February, possibly also during earlier and later months. The term was coined in reports from the UNEP Indian Ocean Experiment (INDOEX). It was found to originate mostly due to farmers burning stubble in northern Indian states such as Punjab, Haryana, and Uttar Pradesh, as well as in the Punjab region of Pakistan. The debilitating air quality in Delhi is also due to the stubble burning in Punjab.

The term atmospheric brown cloud is used for a more generic context not specific to the Asian region.

== Causes ==
The Asian brown cloud is created by a range of airborne particles and pollutants from combustion (e.g., woodfires, cars, and factories), biomass burning and industrial processes with incomplete burning. The cloud is associated with the winter monsoon (October/November to February/March) during which there is no rain to wash pollutants from the air.

== Observations ==
This pollution layer was observed during the Indian Ocean Experiment (INDOEX) intensive field observation in 1999 and described in the UNEP impact assessment study published 2002. Scientists in India claimed that the Asian Brown cloud is not something specific to Asia. Subsequently, when the United Nations Environment Programme (UNEP) organized a follow-up international project, the subject of study was renamed the Atmospheric Brown Cloud with focus on Asia.

The cloud was also reported by NASA in 2004 and 2007.

Although aerosol particles are generally associated with a global cooling effect, recent studies have shown that they can actually have a global warming effect in certain regions such as the Himalayas.

== Impacts ==
=== Health problems ===
One major impact is on health. A 2002 study indicated nearly two million people die each year, in Asia alone, from conditions related to the brown cloud.

=== Regional weather ===
A second assessment study was published in 2008. It highlighted regional concerns regarding:

- Changes of rainfall patterns with the Asian monsoon, as well as a delaying of the start of the Asian monsoon, by several weeks. The observed weakening Indian monsoon and in China northern drought and southern flooding is influenced by the clouds.
- Increase in rainfall over the Australian Top End and Kimberley regions. A CSIRO study has found that by displacing the thermal equator southwards via cooling of the air over East Asia, the monsoon which brings most of the rain to these regions has been intensified and displaced southward.
- Retreat of the Hindu Kush-Himalayan glaciers and snow packs. The cause is attributed to rising air temperatures that are more pronounced in elevated regions, a combined warming effect of greenhouse gases and the Asian Brown Cloud. Also deposition of black carbon decreases the reflection and exacerbates the retreat. Asian glacial melting could lead to water shortages and floods for the hundreds of millions of people who live downstream.
- Decrease of crop harvests. Elevated concentrations of surface ozone are likely to affect crop yields negatively. The impact is crop specific.

=== Cyclone intensity in Arabian Sea ===
A 2011 study found that pollution is making Arabian Sea cyclones more intense as the atmospheric brown clouds has been producing weakening wind patterns which prevent wind shear patterns that historically have prohibited cyclones in the Arabian Sea from becoming major storms. This phenomenon was found responsible for the formation of stronger storms in 2007 and 2010 that were the first recorded storms to enter the Gulf of Oman.

=== Global warming and dimming ===
The 2008 report also addressed the global concern of warming and concluded that the brown clouds have masked 20 to 80 percent of greenhouse gas forcing in the past century. The report suggested that air pollution regulations can have large amplifying effects on global warming.

Another major impact is on the polar ice caps. Black carbon (soot) in the Asian Brown Cloud may be reflecting sunlight and dimming Earth below but it is warming other places by absorbing incoming radiation and warming the atmosphere and whatever it touches. Black carbon is three times more effective than carbon dioxide—the most common greenhouse gas—at melting polar ice and snow. Black carbon in snow causes about three times the temperature change as carbon dioxide in the atmosphere. On snow—even at concentrations below five parts per billion–dark carbon triggers melting, and may be responsible for as much as 94 percent of Arctic warming.

== See also ==
- Asian Dust
- Arctic haze
- Air pollution in India
- Air pollution in Delhi
- Chemical Equator
- 1997, 2006, 2009, 2013 Southeast Asian haze
- 2024 Indo-Pakistani smog
